= Irwindale station =

Light rail station in Irwindale, California

Irwindale
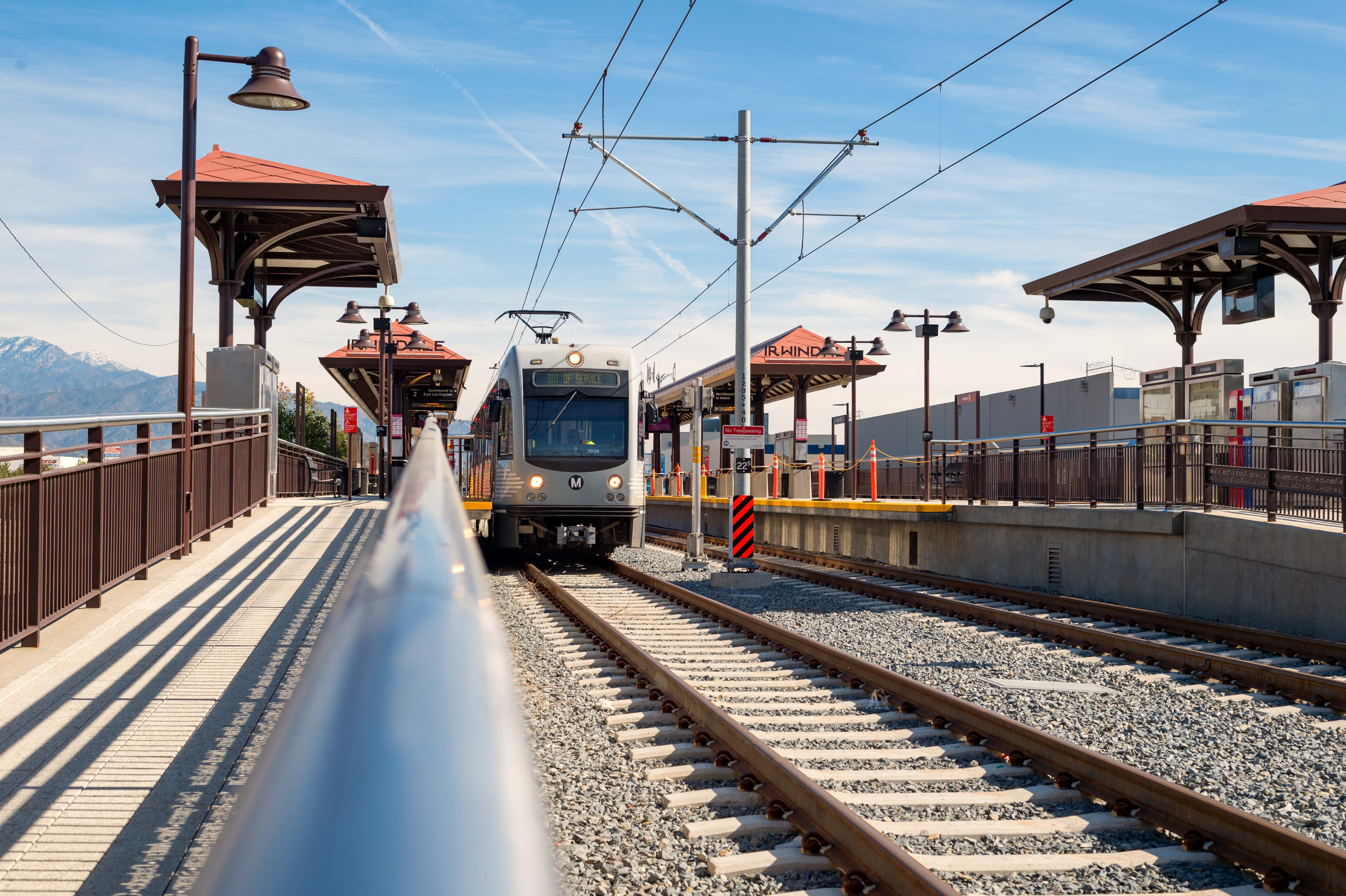
- A test train in early 2016

General information
- Location: 16017 Avenida Padilla; Irwindale, California
- Coordinates: 34.1290°N 117.9336°W
- Owner: Los Angeles Metro
- Platforms: 2 side platforms
- Tracks: 2
- Connections: Foothill Transit

Construction
- Structure type: At-grade
- Parking: 350 spaces
- Cycle facilities: Racks and lockers
- Accessible: Yes

Passengers
- FY 2025: 381 (avg. wkdy boardings)

Services
Preceding station	Metro Rail	Following station
Duarte/City of Hope toward Long Beach	A Line	Azusa Downtown toward Pomona
Former services
Preceding station	Metro Rail	Following station
Duarte/City of Hope toward East Los Angeles	L Line	Azusa Downtown toward Azusa
Location

Irwindale station is an at-grade light rail station on the A Line of the Los Angeles Metro Rail system. It is located at the intersection of Irwindale Avenue and Avenida Padilla in Irwindale, California, after which the station is named. This station opened on March 5, 2016, as part of Phase 2A of the Gold Line Foothill Extension Project.

== History ==
The original train track through Irwindale were built by the Los Angeles and San Gabriel Valley Railroad. The A Line uses the old right of way of the Los Angeles and San Gabriel Valley Railroad who built the first train tracks through Irwindale in 1887. The Los Angeles and San Gabriel Valley Railroad was founded in 1883, by James F. Crank with the goal of bringing a rail line to San Gabriel Valley from downtown Los Angeles. Los Angeles and San Gabriel Valley Railroad was sold on May 20, 1887 into the California Central Railway. In 1889 the rail line was consolidated into Southern California Railway Company. On January 17, 1906, the Southern California Railway was sold to the Atchison, Topeka and Santa Fe Railway and called the Pasadena Subdivision. Amtrak-Santa Fe ran the Southwest Chief and Desert Wind over this line through Irwindale, but relocated the Desert Wind to the Fullerton Line in 1986. The Santa Fe line served the San Gabriel Valley until 1994, when the 1994 Northridge earthquake weakened the bridge in Arcadia and the track was closed until the Gold line was built. The rail line crosses the San Gabriel River on a long girder bridge, then passes through the Santa Fe Dam Recreation Area (how it received its name). The rail line intersected the north end of the former SP Azusa Industrial Track at Irwindale (MP 118.2). Irwindale had a 6,165 foot rail siding that passed the Miller Brewing Company's Irwindale brewery. From there the tracks continued and crossed beneath Irwindale Avenue.

== Service ==
=== Hours and frequency ===
A Line service hours are from approximately 4:30 a.m. and 11:45 p.m. daily. Trains operate every 8 minutes during peak hours, Monday to Friday. Trains run every 10 minutes, during midday on weekdays and weekends, from 9:00 a.m. to 7:00 p.m. Night and early morning service is approximately every 20 minutes every day.

=== Connections ===
As of September 19, 2025, the following connections are available:

- Foothill Transit: 185
