= Arcadia station =

Light rail station in Arcadia, California

Arcadia
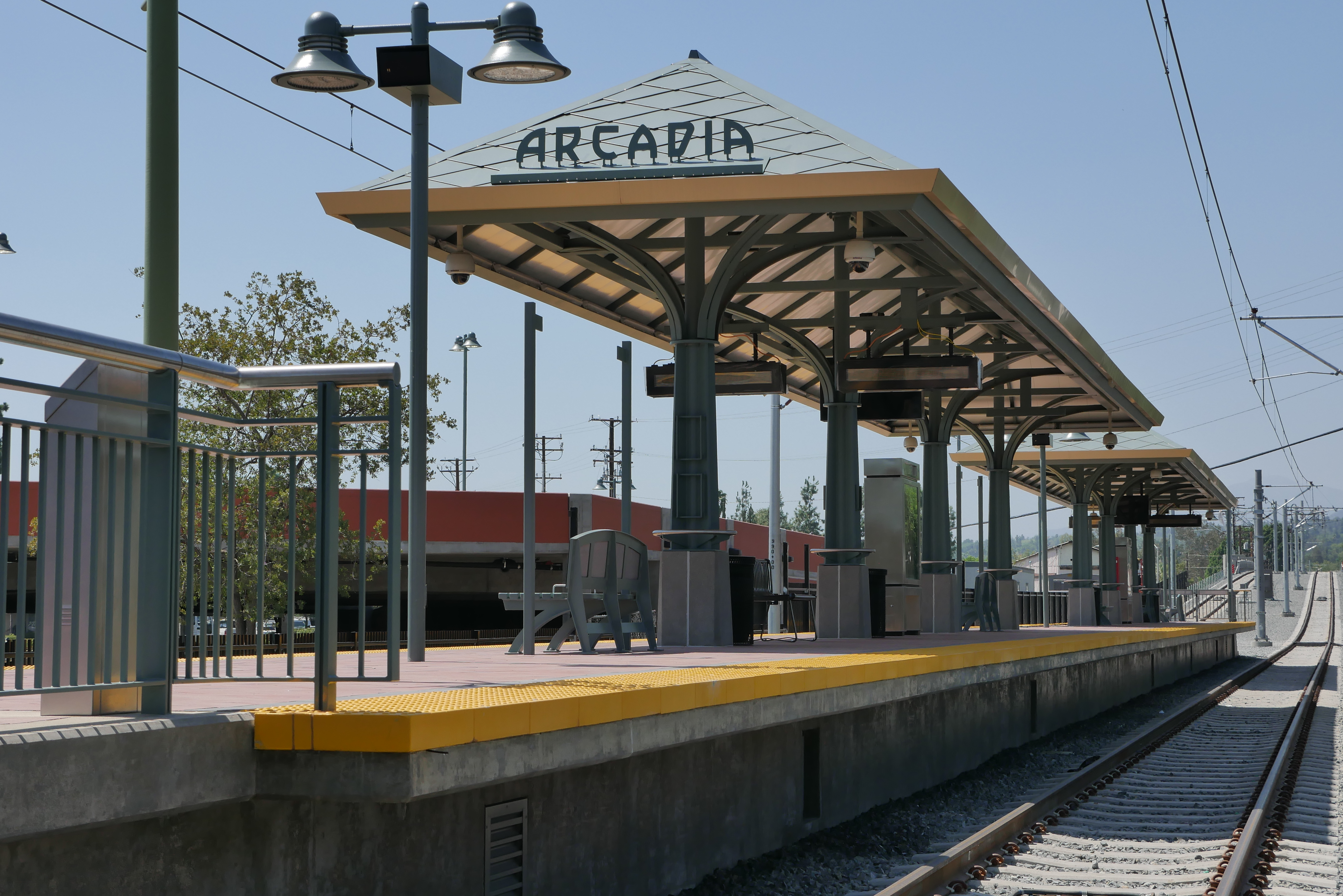
- Arcadia station platform

General information
- Location: 73 East Santa Clara Street; Arcadia, California
- Coordinates: 34.1425°N 118.0288°W
- Owner: Los Angeles Metro
- Platforms: 1 island platform
- Tracks: 2
- Connections: Arcadia Transit; Foothill Transit; Los Angeles Metro Bus

Construction
- Structure type: At-grade
- Parking: 300 spaces
- Cycle facilities: Racks and lockers
- Accessible: Yes

History
- Opened: 1887
- Closed: 1951
- Rebuilt: 2016

Passengers
- FY 2025: 887 (avg. wkdy boardings)

Services
Preceding station	Metro Rail	Following station
Sierra Madre Villa toward Long Beach	A Line	Monrovia toward Pomona
Former services
Preceding station	Metro Rail	Following station
Sierra Madre Villa toward East Los Angeles	L Line	Monrovia toward Azusa
Preceding station	Atchison, Topeka and Santa Fe Railway	Following station
at AT&SF station
Santa Anita toward Los Angeles	Main Line Via Pasadena, Pomona	Monrovia toward Chicago
Preceding station	Pacific Electric	Following station
Santa Anita Park toward Pacific Electric Building	Monrovia–Glendora	Monrovia toward Glendora
Location

Arcadia station is an at-grade light rail station on the A Line of the Los Angeles Metro Rail system. It is located at the intersection of 1st Avenue and Santa Clara Street in Arcadia, California, after which the station is named.

This station opened on March 5, 2016, as part of Phase 2A of the Gold Line Foothill Extension Project. An overpass bridge was constructed over Santa Anita Avenue near the station.

== History ==
=== Former bridge ===
In Arcadia, a steel railroad bridge transitioned the Atchison, Topeka and Santa Fe Railway between the I-210 and street grade. This bridge, between Baldwin and Santa Anita, was deemed unsafe following the 1994 Northridge earthquake and removed by Caltrans. The Phase 2A project constructed the "Iconic Freeway Structure or Gold Line Bridge" (IFS), as the replacement bridge. Designed by Minnesota artist Andrew Leicester, the bridge was unveiled in December 2012. Leicester's design was chosen from 17 others in a competitive process. The artist worked with L.A. design consultant AECOM as well as the bridge's builder, Skanska USA, on the final design and construction. The woven-basket look of the bridge's support columns emulate the woven baskets of the native Chumash people of the San Gabriel Valley while the underside of the bridge evokes a Western diamondback rattlesnake.

=== Former service ===
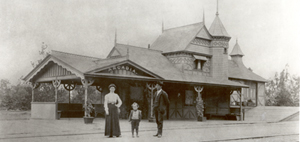
1887 Arcadia Santa Fe station in 1900, relocated in the 1970s to the Fairplex.

Arcadia train station was added two years after the original the Los Angeles and San Gabriel Valley Railroad opened in 1885. The 1887 station was a Queen Anne-style passenger depot on First Avenue. The passenger station was decommissioned in 1951 and relocated in 1970 to the Fairplex, RailGiants Train Museum that is located inside the Los Angeles County Fairgrounds in Pomona. The rail line was operated by the Atchison, Topeka and Santa Fe Railroad (Santa Fe), and served Amtrak's Southwest Chief and Desert Wind, although the latter never stopped at Arcadia. The Santa Fe line served the San Gabriel Valley until 1994, when the 1994 Northridge earthquake weakened the bridge in Arcadia. After the line was decommissioned in 1994, Arcadia became the destination for Metrolink's Rose Bowl Game train on New Year's Day. In 1996, a Sprinter was run from Arcadia to Monrovia. For an unknown period of time, the station was the home of a private railcar called the Pine Bluff until its purchase in the mid-2000s.

Arcadia train station should not be confused with the Lucky Baldwin's Santa Anita Depot that was a freight depot at Santa Anita Avenue and Colorado Boulevard and moved to the Los Angeles County Arboretum and Botanic Garden in 1970.

The station was formally dedicated in a ceremony held on August 22, 2015. Regular light rail service to the station began on March 5, 2016.

== Service ==
=== Hours and frequency ===
A Line service hours are from approximately 4:30 a.m. and 11:45 p.m. daily. Trains operate every 8 minutes during peak hours, Monday to Friday. Trains run every 10 minutes, during midday on weekdays and weekends, from 9:00 a.m. to 7:00 p.m. Night and early morning service is approximately every 20 minutes every day.

=== Connections ===
As of September 19, 2025, the following connections are available:

- Arcadia Transit: Blue, Green, Red
- Foothill Transit: 187, 270
- Los Angeles Metro Bus: 179, 287
