= Duarte/City of Hope station =

Light rail station in Duarte, California

Duarte/City of Hope
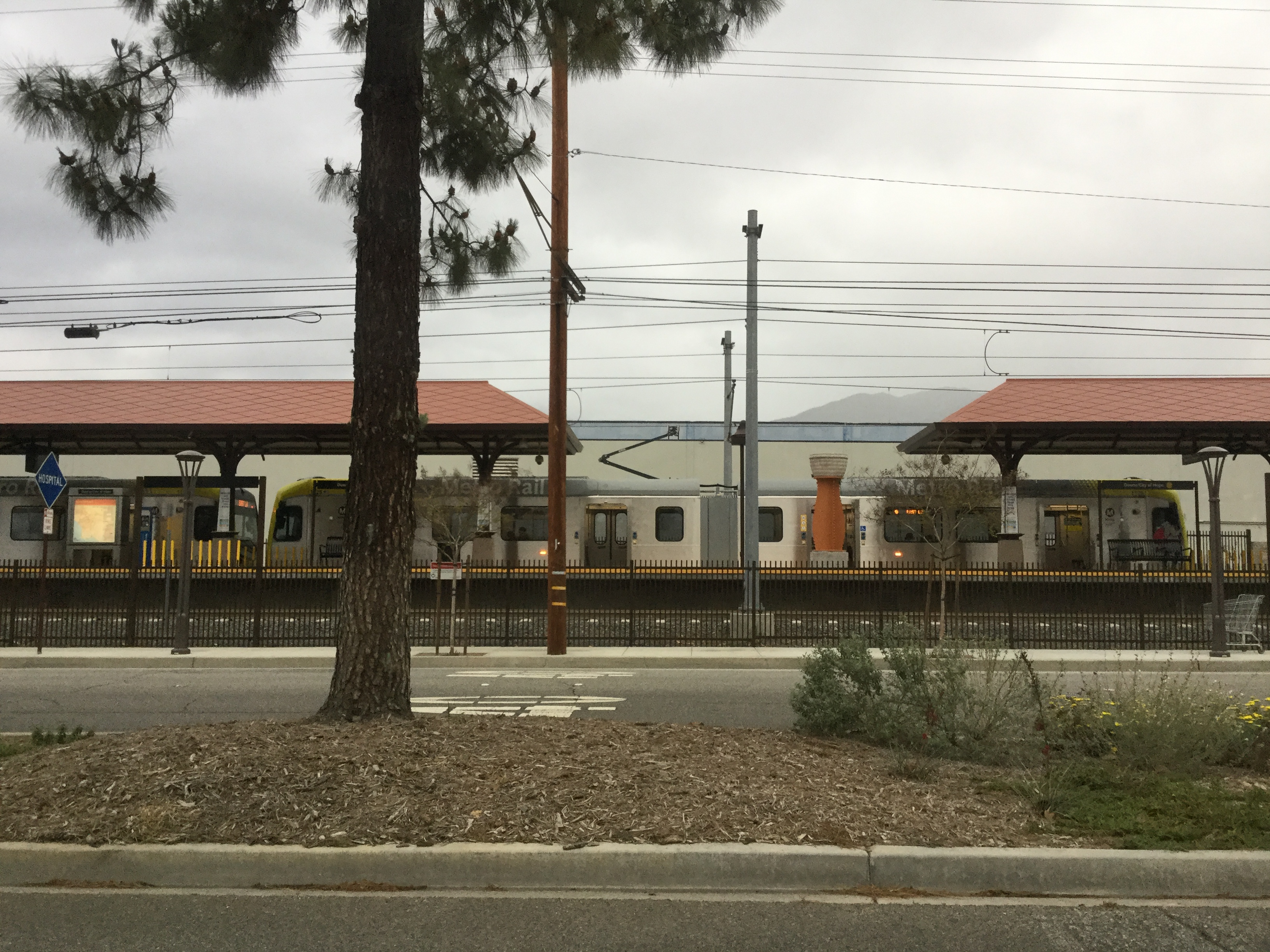
- Duarte/City of Hope station platform

General information
- Location: 1789 Business Center Drive; Duarte, California
- Coordinates: 34.1326°N 117.9680°W
- Owner: Los Angeles Metro
- Platforms: 1 island platform
- Tracks: 2
- Connections: Foothill Transit

Construction
- Structure type: At-grade
- Parking: 125 spaces
- Cycle facilities: Racks and lockers
- Accessible: Yes

History
- Opened: 1886
- Rebuilt: 2016
- Former names: Duarte

Passengers
- FY 2025: 620 (avg. wkdy boardings)

Services
Preceding station	Metro Rail	Following station
Monrovia toward Long Beach	A Line	Irwindale toward Pomona
Former services
Preceding station	Metro Rail	Following station
Monrovia toward East Los Angeles	L Line	Irwindale toward Azusa
Preceding station	Atchison, Topeka and Santa Fe Railway	Following station
at AT&SF station
Monrovia toward Los Angeles	Main Line Via Pasadena, Pomona	Azusa toward Chicago
Location

Duarte/City of Hope station is an at-grade light rail station on the A Line of the Los Angeles Metro Rail system. It is located at the intersection of Duarte Road and Highland Avenue in Duarte, California, after which the station is named, along with the City of Hope National Medical Center located across the street from the station.

This station opened on March 5, 2016, as part of Phase 2A of the Gold Line Foothill Extension Project.

== History ==
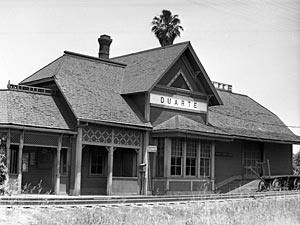
The Duarte train depot built by the California Central Railway in 1897 and sold to Santa Fe in 1907.

The 1886 Duarte train station was the terminal station for the original trains for the Los Angeles and San Gabriel Valley Railroad. The Metro A Line uses the old right of way of the Los Angeles and San Gabriel Valley Railroad who built the first train tracks and 1886 station in Duarte. The Los Angeles and San Gabriel Valley Railroad was founded in 1883, by James F. Crank with the goal of bringing a rail line to San Gabriel Valley from downtown Los Angeles. Los Angeles and San Gabriel Valley Railroad was sold on May 20, 1887, into the California Central Railway. The California Central Railway built a Duarte train depot in 1897. In 1889 the rail line and station was consolidated into Southern California Railway Company. On January 17, 1906, Southern California Railway was sold to the Atchison, Topeka and Santa Fe Railway and called the Pasadena Subdivision. Amtrak-Santa Fe ran the Southwest Chief and Desert Wind over this line in Duarte, but relocated the Desert Wind to the Fullerton Line in 1986. The Santa Fe line served the San Gabriel Valley until 1994, when the 1994 Northridge earthquake weakened the bridge in Arcadia and the track was closed until the light rail line was built.

== Service ==
=== Hours and frequency ===
A Line service hours are from approximately 4:30 a.m. and 11:45 p.m. daily. Trains operate every 8 minutes during peak hours, Monday to Friday. Trains run every 10 minutes, during midday on weekdays and weekends, from 9:00 a.m. to 7:00 p.m. Night and early morning service is approximately every 20 minutes every day.

=== Connections ===
As of September 19, 2025, the following connections are available:

- Foothill Transit: 272, 861 (Duarte eBus)
