= Monrovia station =

Light rail station in California, US

Monrovia
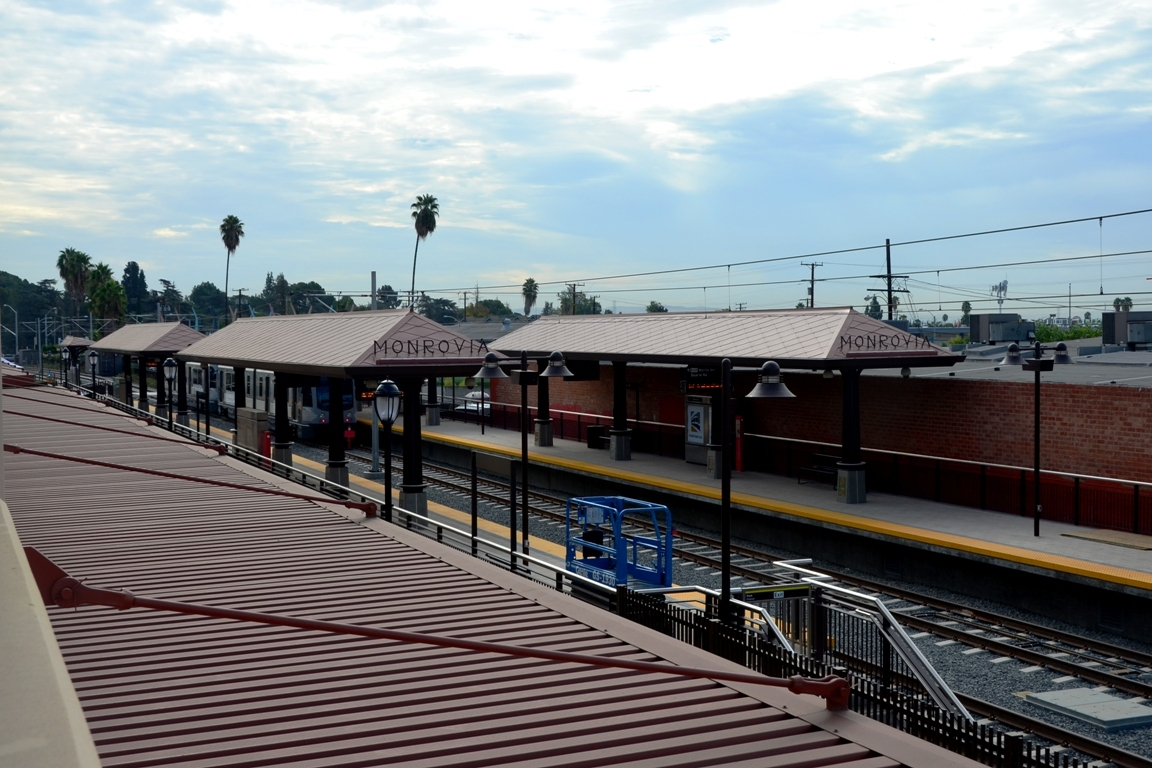
- Monrovia station platform

General information
- Location: 1641 South Primrose Avenue; Monrovia, California
- Coordinates: 34°07′59″N 118°00′12″W
- Owner: Los Angeles Metro
- Platforms: 2 side platforms
- Tracks: 2
- Connections: Foothill Transit

Construction
- Structure type: At-grade
- Parking: 350 spaces
- Cycle facilities: Racks and lockers
- Accessible: Yes

History
- Opened: 1886
- Rebuilt: 1926, 2016

Passengers
- FY 2026: 808 (avg. wkdy boardings)

Services
Preceding station	Metro Rail	Following station
Arcadia toward Long Beach	A Line	Duarte/City of Hope toward Pomona
Former services
Preceding station	Metro Rail	Following station
Arcadia toward East Los Angeles	L Line	Duarte/City of Hope toward Azusa
Preceding station	Atchison, Topeka and Santa Fe Railway	Following station
at AT&SF station
Arcadia toward Los Angeles	Main Line Via Pasadena, Pomona	Duarte toward Chicago
Location

The Monrovia station in 1884 with a streetcar pulled by a mule on Myrtle Avenue in Monrovia, California. The Streetcar was sponsored by Cronenweit Jewelers which has a store in Monrovia and Azusa. The mule would pull the rail streetcar up hill to downtown and then be loaded on trailer and coast down to the station

Monrovia station is an at-grade light rail station on the A Line of the Los Angeles Metro Rail system. It is located at the intersection of Duarte Road and Myrtle Avenue in Monrovia, California, after which the station is named. This station opened on March 5, 2016, as part of Phase 2A of the Gold Line Foothill Extension Project.

== History ==
The Los Angeles and San Gabriel Valley Railroad built the first train tracks and station in Monrovia in 1887. The Los Angeles and San Gabriel Valley Railroad was founded in 1883, by James F. Crank with the goal of bringing a rail line to San Gabriel Valley from downtown Los Angeles. Los Angeles and San Gabriel Valley Railroad was sold on May 20, 1887 into the California Central Railway. In 1889 this was consolidated into Southern California Railway Company. On January 17, 1906 Southern California Railway was sold to the Atchison, Topeka and Santa Fe Railway and designated the Pasadena Subdivision.

Installed in 1887, a mule-drawn railway with a single passenger car, called the Myrtle Avenue Railroad at that time ran from the Monrovia station up Myrtle Ave to downtown Monrovia. On the way back down to the rail station, the mule was loaded onto a flatcar and downhill gravity took the cars back to the station. By the early 1920s the partially mule-powered streetcar system was removed. In 1906 the first Pacific Electric rail car arrived in Monrovia. The PE Pasadena and Monrovia line ended in 1951. Santa Fe Middle School near the station is named after the Santa Fe Railway.

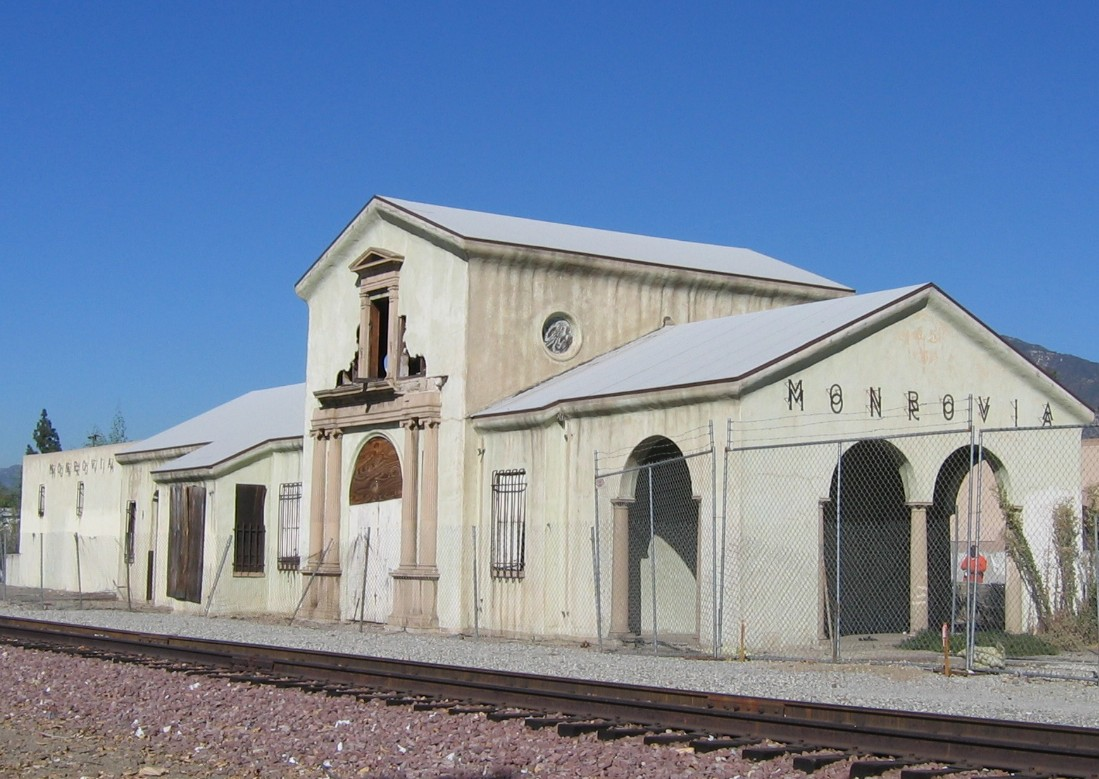
1926 Monrovia train station, immediately east of the Gold Line stop

The current railway station reuses the former Atchison, Topeka and Santa Fe Railway depot which was built in 1926. It is designed in a Spanish colonial revival style. The 1926 station replaced a wooden depot built on the site in 1886 by the original Los Angeles and San Gabriel Valley Railroad. Passenger trains ceased to stop at Monrovia by April 1956, though the station's passenger ticketing office remained open through the late 1960s. Santa Fe and later Amtrak ran the Southwest Chief and Desert Wind over this line in Monrovia, but rerouted passenger trains to the Fullerton Line in 1986. The Santa Fe line served the San Gabriel Valley until 1994, when the 1994 Northridge earthquake weakened the bridge in Arcadia. With the completion of the Gold Line in Monrovia, the 1926-era Monrovia train station is slated to be restored.

The Santa Fe Depot was used in a number of Hollywood movies through the years. It is used two times in the 1966 movie The Trouble with Angels, both at the start and the ending in which the girls leave St. Francis Academy.

=== Vehicle maintenance facility ===
As part of the light rail extension, the Gold Line Authority and Metro built a new Maintenance and Operations (M&O) Facility in Monrovia, east of Monrovia station. The 27-acre (11 ha) facility services, cleans and stores light rail vehicles for Metro's fleet, with a total storage capacity of 104 vehicles. The facility, known as Metro Division 24 Yard, is located just north of the right of way between California Avenue and Shamrock Avenue. It cost $53 million to build.

== Service ==
=== Hours and frequency ===
A Line service hours are from approximately 4:30 a.m. and 11:45 p.m. daily. Trains operate every 8 minutes during peak hours, Monday to Friday. Trains run every 10 minutes, during midday on weekdays and weekends, from 9:00 a.m. to 7:00 p.m. Night and early morning service is approximately every 20 minutes every day.

=== Connections ===
As of September 19, 2025, the following connections are available:

- Foothill Transit: 270

== Neighborhood and destinations ==
The city of Monrovia created a transit-oriented district around the station. The district, known as the Station Square Transit Village Mixed Use District, has mixed retail, residential and office uses, with pedestrian amenities and connections. Construction of phase one of the new district started in 2017. Between the station and the I-210 Foothill Freeway is the Station Square Transit Center, with a park and parking lot, also new apartment buildings. Plans are to restore/renovate the historic 1926 Monrovia Santa Fe train station depot at the location, though the actual use of the station is not yet determined as of 2013.
