= Azusa station =

Azusa station may refer to:

- APU/Citrus College station
- Azusa Downtown station
