= La Verne/Fairplex station =

Light rail station in La Verne, California

La Verne/Fairplex
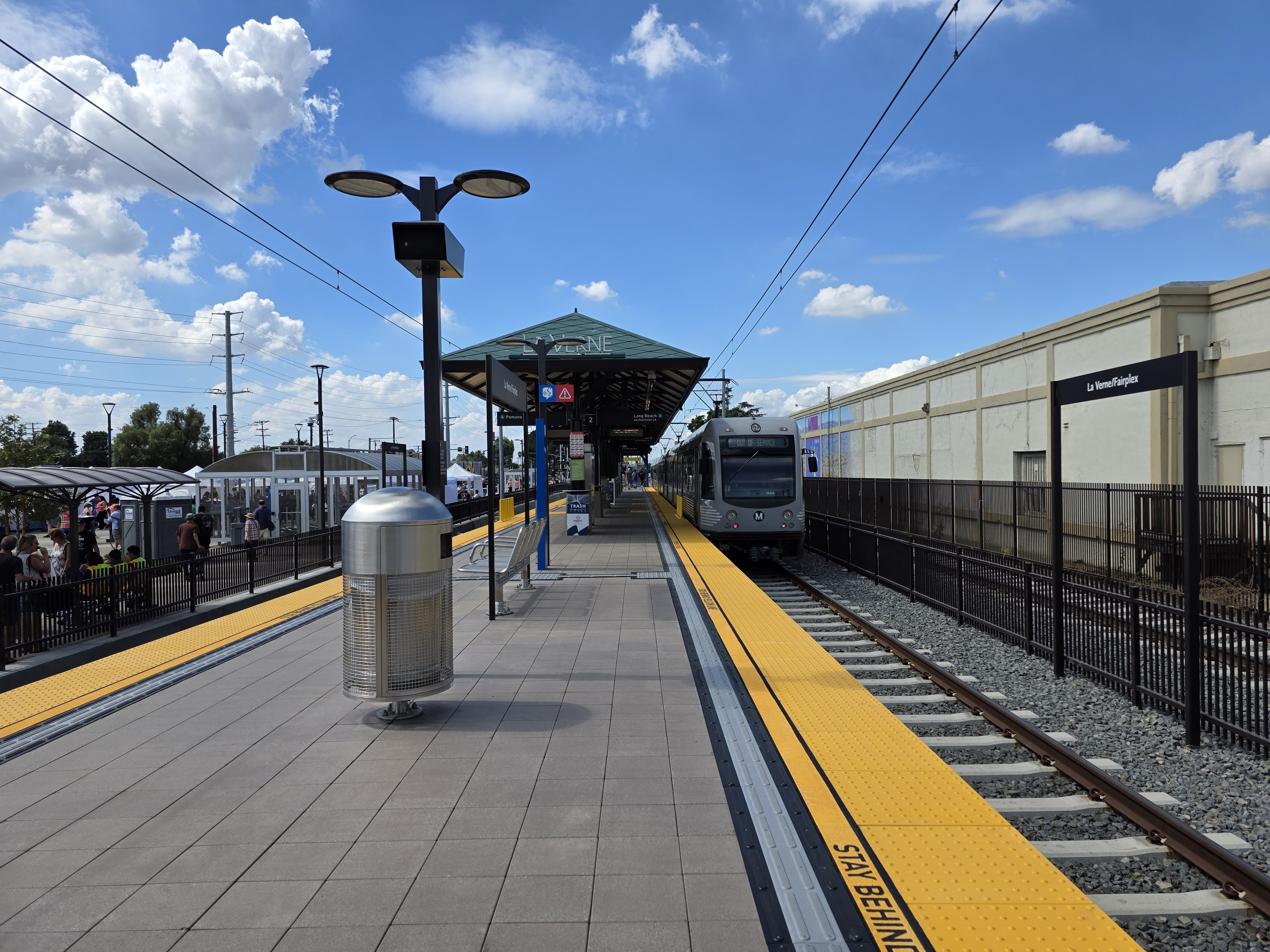
- La Verne/Fairplex station platform on opening day, September 19, 2025

General information
- Coordinates: 34.0974°N 117.7688°W
- Owner: Los Angeles Metro
- Platforms: 1 island platform
- Tracks: 2
- Connections: Foothill Transit

Construction
- Parking: 262 spaces
- Accessible: Yes

History
- Opened: September 19, 2025; 11 months ago

Passengers
- FY 2026: 311 (avg. wkdy boardings)

Services
Preceding station	Metro Rail	Following station
San Dimas toward Long Beach	A Line	Pomona North Terminus
Former services (at AT&SF station)
Preceding station	Atchison, Topeka and Santa Fe Railway	Following station
San Dimas toward Los Angeles	Main Line Via Pasadena, Pomona	Pomona toward Chicago
Location

La Verne/Fairplex station is an at-grade light rail station in the Los Angeles Metro Rail system. It is located near the intersection of Arrow Highway and E Street along the Pasadena Subdivision in La Verne, California. The University of La Verne is northwest of the station, and the Fairplex, home of the Los Angeles County Fair, is one block to the south. The station is served by the A Line, has a single island platform, and four TAP exit gates with validators, two on the E Street and two on the White Avenue entrances/exits.

During planning, the station was simply known as "La Verne", with Metro adopting the current name in March 2019 in response to staff recommendation and community feedback.

As the third station on the Foothill Extension Phase 2B to Pomona project, it was officially dedicated with a ceremony on June 21, 2025, featuring regional politicians and a celebration for the general public. It opened on September 19, 2025.

The city of La Verne, in partnership with the San Gabriel Valley Council of Governments, intends to construct a pedestrian overpass connecting the A Line station with the Fairplex. The overpass will cross Arrow Highway and the San Bernardino Line railroad right-of-way.

== Service ==
=== Hours and frequency ===
A Line service hours are from approximately 4:30 a.m. and 11:45 p.m. daily. Trains operate every 8 minutes during peak hours, Monday to Friday. Trains run every 10 minutes, during midday on weekdays and weekends, from 9:00 a.m. to 7:00 p.m. Night and early morning service is approximately every 20 minutes every day.

=== Connections ===
The following connections are available:

- Foothill Transit: 197

== Notable places nearby ==
- Fairplex
- Knight Riders Cricket Ground
- University of La Verne
