= Azusa Downtown station =

Light rail station in Azusa, California

Azusa Downtown
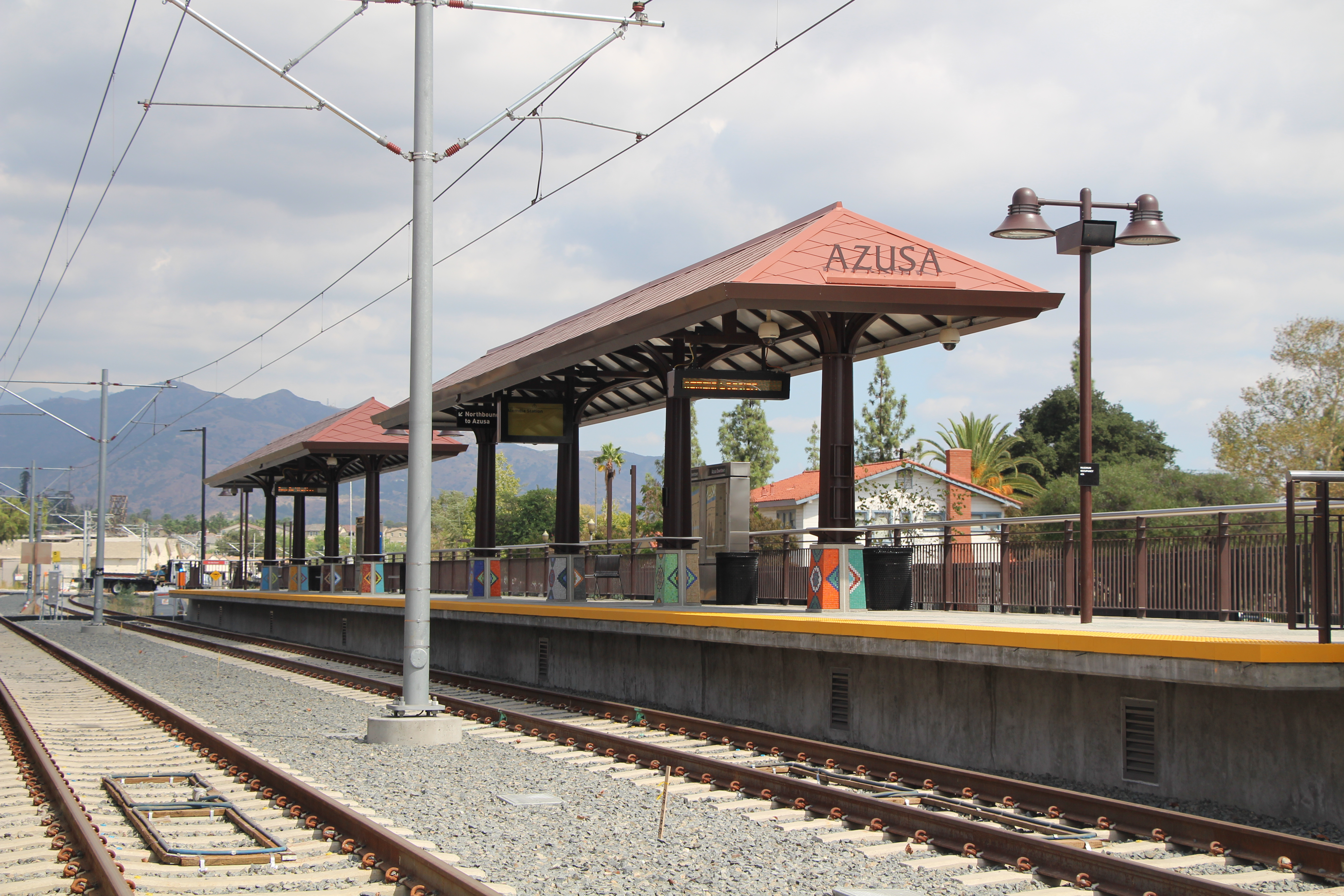
- Azusa Downtown station platform

General information
- Location: 780 North Alameda Avenue; Azusa, California
- Coordinates: 34°08′09″N 117°54′22″W
- Owner: Los Angeles Metro
- Platforms: 2 side platforms
- Tracks: 2
- Connections: Foothill Transit

Construction
- Structure type: At-grade
- Parking: 534 spaces
- Cycle facilities: Racks and lockers
- Accessible: Yes

History
- Opened: 1887
- Rebuilt: March 5, 2016; 10 years ago
- Former names: Azusa/Alameda

Passengers
- FY 2025: 966 (avg. wkdy boardings)

Services
Preceding station	Metro Rail	Following station
Irwindale toward Long Beach	A Line	APU/Citrus College toward Pomona
Former services
Preceding station	Metro Rail	Following station
Irwindale toward East Los Angeles	L Line	APU/Citrus College toward Azusa
Preceding station	Atchison, Topeka and Santa Fe Railway	Following station
at AT&SF station
Duarte toward Los Angeles	Main Line Via Pasadena, Pomona	Glendora toward Chicago
Location

Azusa Downtown station is an at-grade light rail station on the A Line of the Los Angeles Metro Rail system. It is located on Alameda Avenue, a block north of Foothill Boulevard, in Downtown Azusa, after which the station is named.

This station opened on March 5, 2016, as part of Phase 2A of the Gold Line Foothill Extension Project.

== History ==
The original train stop in Azusa opened in 1887 by the Los Angeles and San Gabriel Valley Railroad. The Gold Line uses the old right of way of the Los Angeles and San Gabriel Valley Railroad, which built the first train tracks and 1887 station in Azusa. The Los Angeles and San Gabriel Valley Railroad was founded in 1883, by James F. Crank with the goal of bringing a rail line to San Gabriel Valley from downtown Los Angeles. The Los Angeles and San Gabriel Valley Railroad was sold on May 20, 1887 to the California Central Railway. In 1889 this was consolidated into Southern California Railway Company. On January 17, 1906, the Southern California Railway was sold to the Atchison, Topeka and Santa Fe Railway and called the Pasadena Subdivision. Santa Fe, later Amtrak, ran the Southwest Chief and Desert Wind over this line in Azusa, but relocated the Desert Wind to the Fullerton Line in 1986. The Santa Fe line served the San Gabriel Valley until 1994, when the 1994 Northridge earthquake weakened the bridge in Arcadia and the track was closed until the Gold Line was built. The Santa Fe 1888 Azusa station depot was completely remodeled in 1946.

== Service ==
=== Hours and frequency ===
A Line service hours are from approximately 4:30 a.m. and 11:45 p.m. daily. Trains operate every 8 minutes during peak hours, Monday to Friday. Trains run every 10 minutes, during midday on weekdays and weekends, from 9:00 a.m. to 7:00 p.m. Night and early morning service is approximately every 20 minutes every day.

=== Connections ===
As of September 19, 2025, the following connections are available:

- Foothill Transit: 185, 187, 188, 280
