= Foothill Extension =

Light rail extension project in Los Angeles County, California

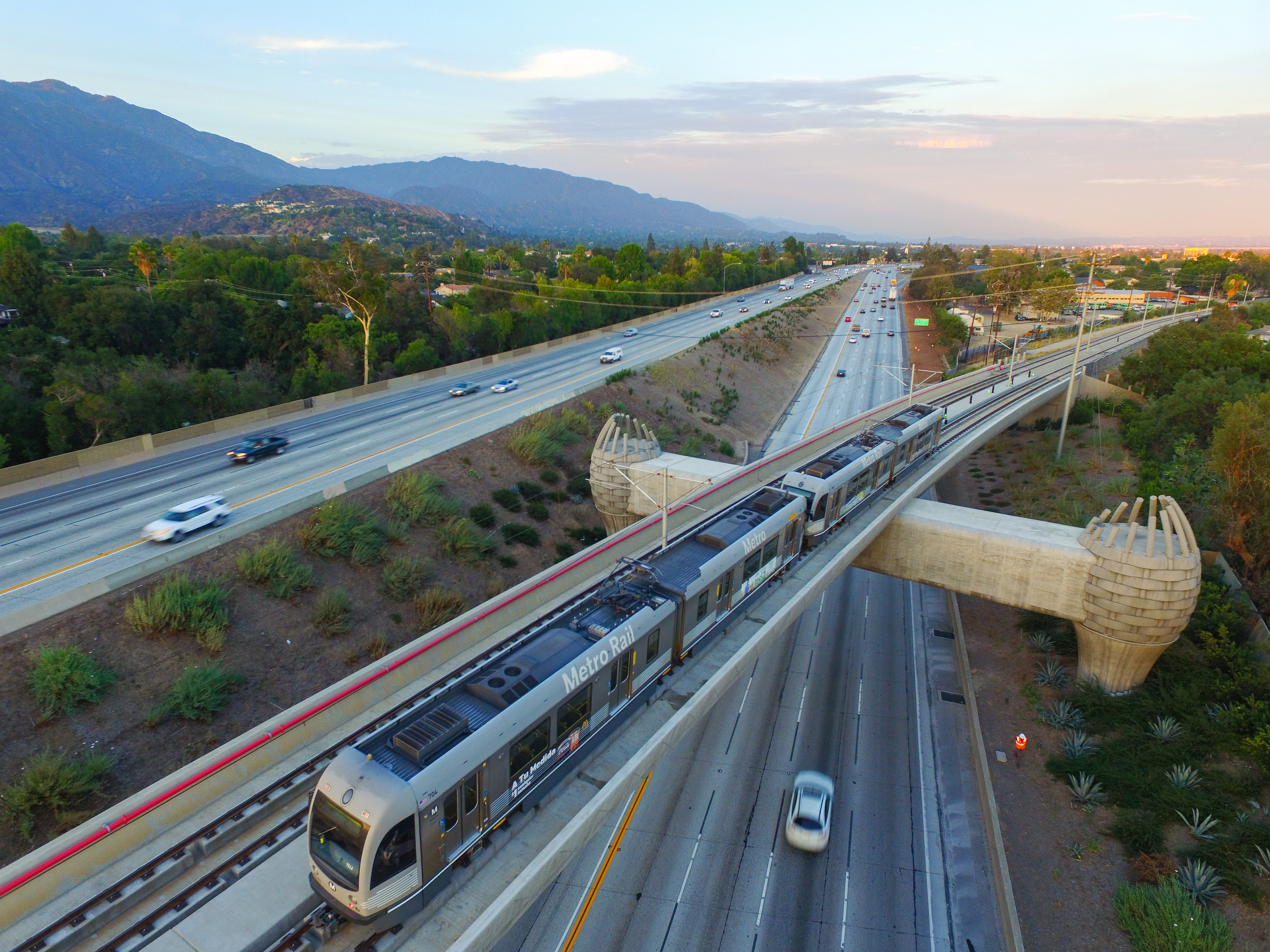
- Foothill Freeway overpass east of Sierra Madre Villa station

Overview
- Status: Phase 2A: Complete; Phase 2B to Pomona: Complete; Phase 2B to Claremont: In planning Phase 2B to Montclair: On hold
- Locale: Los Angeles, Pasadena, Azusa, Pomona
- Termini: Sierra Madre Villa; APU/Citrus College (Phase 2A) Pomona North (Phase 2B to Pomona) Claremont (Phase 2B to Claremont) Montclair (Phase 2B to Montclair)
- Stations: 6 (Phase 2A); 4 (Phase 2B to Pomona); 1 (Phase 2B to Claremont); 1 (Phase 2B to Montclair)

Service
- Type: Light rail
- System: Los Angeles Metro Rail
- Operator: Los Angeles Metro

History
- Planned opening: 2031 (Phase 2B to Claremont); TBD (Phase 2B to Montclair)
- Opened: March 5, 2016; 10 years ago (Phase 2A); September 19, 2025; 13 months ago (Phase 2B to Pomona)

Technical
- Line length: 11.5 mi (18.5 km) (Phase 2A); 9.1 mi (14.6 km) (Phase 2B to Pomona); 2 mi (3.2 km) (Phase 2B to Claremont); 1.2 mi (1.9 km) (Phase 2B to Montclair)
- Track gauge: 4 ft 8 1/2 in (1,435 mm)
- Electrification: Overhead line, 750 V DC
Route map
Phase 2A highlighted in red, 2B to Pomona in purple, 2B to Claremont in green, 2B to Montclair in blue

The Foothill Extension (formerly the Gold Line Foothill Extension) is a construction project extending the light rail A Line, a part of the Los Angeles Metro Rail system. The project begins at the former terminus of the former Gold Line at Sierra Madre Villa station in Pasadena and continues east through the "Foothill Cities" of Los Angeles County. The plan's first stage, "Phase 2A", extended the then-Gold Line to APU/Citrus College station in Azusa; it opened on March 5, 2016. The first part of "Phase 2B" extended the now A Line a further four stations to Pomona North station on the Metrolink San Bernardino Line in Pomona, thereby returning passenger rail service to the full right of way originally built out by the Los Angeles and San Gabriel Valley Railroad in 1887. It broke ground in December 2017 and opened on September 19, 2025.

The second part of Phase 2B will further extend the line east to the Claremont San Bernardino Line station. Construction is expected to break ground in 2027 and be completed in 2031.

The corridor extension is being planned, managed, and implemented by the Foothill Gold Line Construction Authority, simply known as Foothill Gold Line. The joint powers authority is governed by appointees from Los Angeles Metro, the San Bernardino County Transportation Authority (SBCTA), the San Gabriel Valley Council of Governments (SVGCOG), and the cities of Los Angeles, South Pasadena, and Pasadena. In addition to enhancing mobility in one of the most congested metropolitan areas in the United States, the 23.8-mile project (38.3 km) is seen as an economic catalyst for the region, generating 6,900 jobs during the construction phase and creating infill and transit-oriented development opportunities.

With the Regional Connector having opened on June 16, 2023, the north (Pasadena–Azusa–Pomona) branch of the then-L/Gold Line was absorbed into the A Line, providing service from Long Beach via Downtown Los Angeles and Pasadena to Azusa.

== Route ==
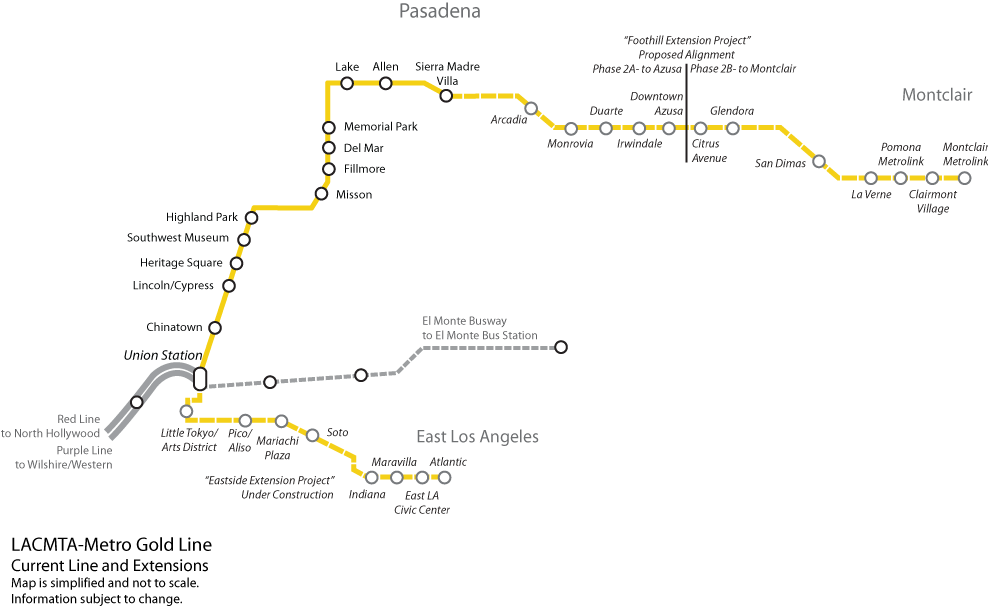
Map of the former L Line, with the Foothill Extension along the top. Note that Citrus Avenue station was eventually opened as part of Phase 2A as APU/Citrus College station.

The entire 23.8-mile (38.3 km) route (Phase 2A and 2B) of the Foothill Extension follows the roadbed of the former Atchison, Topeka & Santa Fe Railway's Second Division through the Foothill Cities. These cities are in the foothills south of the San Gabriel Mountains, in the northern San Gabriel and Pomona valleys. Beginning at the former Gold Line terminus at Sierra Madre Villa station in Pasadena, the route extends roughly east, ending at the Montclair Transit Center in Montclair, in San Bernardino County. The route parallels several major roads and highways, including I-210 (Foothill Freeway), Huntington Drive, and Foothill Boulevard.

== Planning and Phase 2A ==
The Foothill Extension was initially conceived as "Phase 2" of the Gold Line, split into two parts, hence the numbering of its two phases. The route between Los Angeles and Pasadena is considered "Phase 1". The Gold Line Construction Authority (now Foothill Gold Line), which took over the Phase 1 project from Metro in 1999, also coordinates the Phase 2 projects.

The initial draft environmental impact report (DEIR) for the Gold Line Foothill Extension was completed in April 2006 and covered the entire corridor between Sierra Madre Villa station in Pasadena and the Montclair Transit Center in Montclair. The final environmental impact report (FEIR) study assessed two different construction options: an LRT Full Build alternative, which would complete the full extension to Montclair, and an LRT Build To Azusa alternative, which would extend only to Azusa; this was dubbed Phase 2A. On February 28, 2007, the Construction Authority Board certified the final EIR and decided to complete the "LRT Build to Azusa" alternative.

In October 2009, the Los Angeles Metro board of directors unanimously voted to include the Gold Line Foothill Extension in its long-range plan and approved funding for the construction and operation of Phase 2A. A groundbreaking ceremony for Phase 2A was held on June 26, 2010; construction began the following summer and was completed in September 2015, with the extension entering service on March 5, 2016. The original project budget for Phase 2A was $690 million, including not only construction but also the purchase of vehicles, financing, administrative costs, mitigation, and other costs; in March 2011, the Construction Authority requested a $45 million increase in total budget, to $735 million, to reflect updated cost estimates. Phase 2A is 11.5 miles (18.5 km) long and included stations at Arcadia, Monrovia, Duarte/City of Hope, Irwindale, Azusa Downtown, and APU/Citrus College, as well as a new Division 24 Maintenance and Storage Facility.

== Phase 2B ==
Phase 2B is the project to extend the A Line from the Phase 2A terminus in Azusa east to Montclair. The final EIR was certified by the Foothill Gold Line Construction Authority (Foothill Gold Line) board in March 2013.

=== Proposed station listing ===
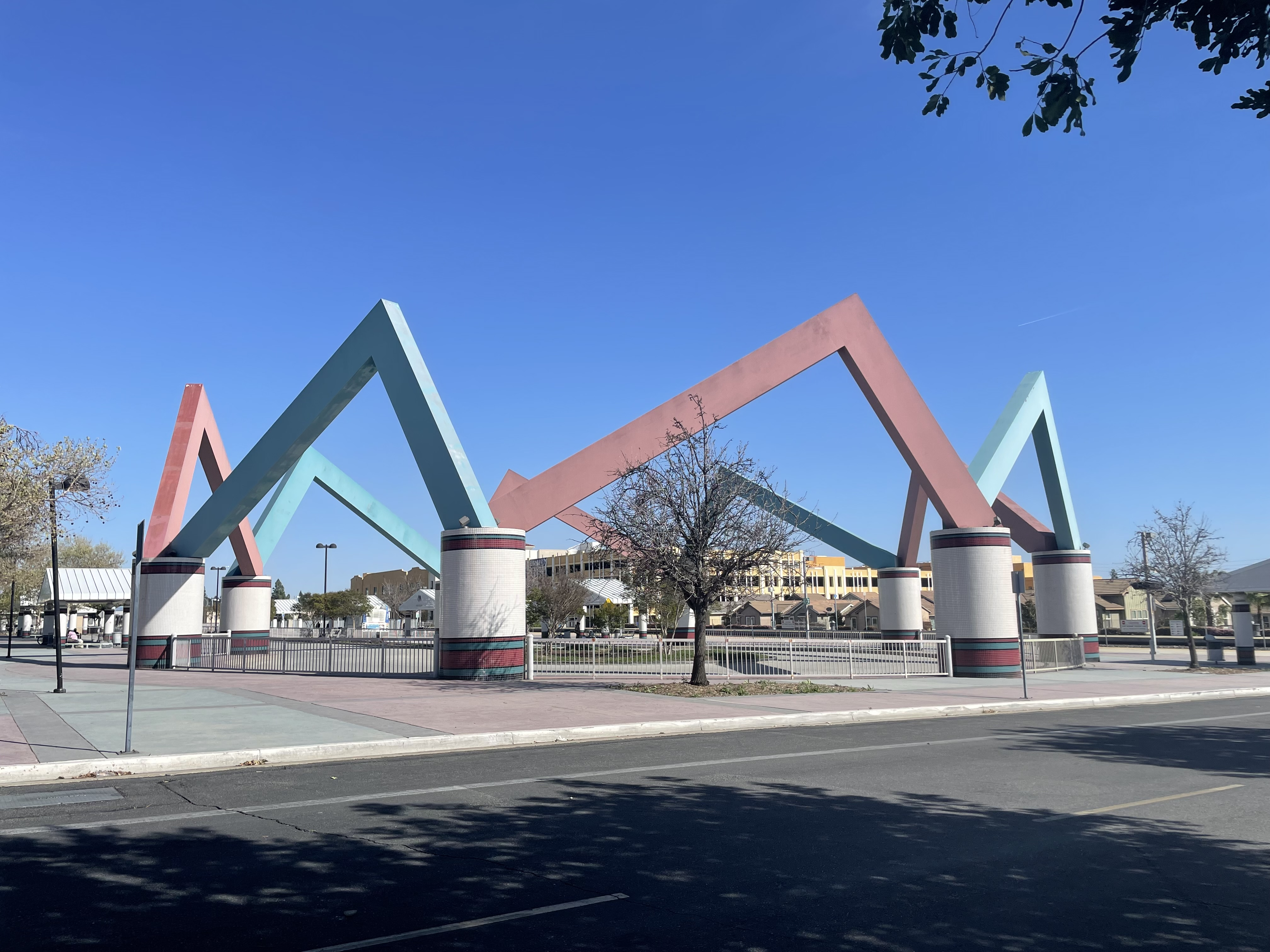
Montclair – proposed terminus of the line

Phase 2B is 12.3 miles (19.8 km) long and will take approximately 17.9 minutes to traverse. The segment between Azusa and Pomona is 9.1 miles (14.6 km) long and the segment between Pomona and Montclair is 3.2 miles (5.1 km) long. The alignment will have six new Metro stations: Glendora; San Dimas; La Verne/Fairplex; and Pomona North with a connection to the Metrolink San Bernardino Line; Claremont with a connection to the Metrolink San Bernardino Line; and Montclair with a connection to the Metrolink San Bernardino Line. Foothill Gold Line expects 17,800 riders by 2035.

=== Status ===
Planning for the Foothill Extension Phase 2B (Azusa–Montclair) began in 2003, and significant work has been completed for the segment. The final EIR for the project was certified by the Foothill Gold Line board in March 2013, and advanced conceptual engineering began in 2014. On June 23, 2017, the Los Angeles Metro board of directors approved a $1.4 billion budget to extend the A Line (then the Gold Line) from APU/Citrus College station in Pasadena to Claremont station in Claremont, 11.5 miles (18.5 km) to the east. However, officials in San Bernardino County convinced planners to further continue the extension to the Montclair Transit Center in Montclair, an additional 0.8 miles (1.3 km) to the east, saying the transit center made for a natural terminus for the line. It is expected to cost an additional $70 million to extend the A Line from Claremont to Montclair, across county lines. Construction on Phase 2B of the Foothill Extension is split into two projects. Project 1 is the relocation of freight railroad tracks, which is complete. Project 2 is the construction of the light rail line itself the A Line utilizes.

Full construction to Claremont and Montclair by 2028 depended on additional funding to be secured by October 2021. However, on September 10, 2021, state funding was past due for constructing the route further east of Pomona. This pushed the opening date to Montclair back, as well as outright placing the 3.2-mile segment at risk of cancellation altogether. However, Foothill Gold Line was persistent in seeking funding for the project.

On July 8, 2024, Governor of California Gavin Newsom and the California State Transportation Agency (CalSTA) announced the distribution of the first year of funding from California State Senate Bill 125 (SB125). Metro allocated $798 million of SB125 funding to complete the Los Angeles County portion of the Pomona–Montclair segment. Courtesy of the state’s Transit and Intercity Rail Capital Program (TIRCP), CalSTA released close to $500 million for the project, with the remainder of the $798 million to be allocated by the end of 2024. On July 11, 2024, the Foothill Gold Line board of directors unanimously voted to work with Kiewit Corporation as their contractor to build the Pomona–Montclair segment. The project's construction contract award is set for spring 2025 and should take five years to complete and open in 2030. On October 31, 2024, having received the total $798 million in funding from CalSTA, the Metro board of directors unanimously voted to transfer the funds to Foothill Gold Line. Additionally, the San Bernardino County Transportation Authority (SBCTA) has set aside $80 million in funding to directly fund the construction of the approximately 1-mile-long (1.6 km) segment of the extension within San Bernardino County, matching the project's current total estimated cost of $878 million.

However, on March 26, 2025, Foothill Gold Line canceled their bid with Kiewit due to the final bid remaining hundreds of millions of dollars above expert estimates and available funding. If a new bid is accepted by October 15, 2025, construction will begin in 2027 with an updated completion date of 2031. However, at a board meeting on September 3, 2025, the SBCTA board of directors voted to divest the $37 million it had allocated to the 0.65-mile-long (1.05 km) segment of the Pomona–Montclair segment within San Bernardino County, redirecting the funds to other uses due to rising costs and limited local input. The decision placed the Claremont–Montclair segment on indefinite hold, while the Pomona–Claremont segment remained unaffected and is scheduled to be constructed independently of it. At its January 14, 2026 meeting, Metro's Construction Committee approved $94 million in funding for design and engineering on the Pomona–Claremont segment. At its January 29, 2026 meeting, the Foothill Gold Line board of directors unanimously voted to award the design and engineering services contract to Parsons. At its May 27, 2026 meeting, the Foothill Gold Line board of directors unanimously voted to award the construction manager contract for the Pomona–Claremont segment to SSH Joint Venture, comprising Skanska, Stacy Witbeck, and Herzog.

On December 16, 2025, in response to the SBCTA divesting from the project, the city of Montclair filed a demand to cure against them, alleging that the decision was in violation of Measure I, a half-cent county sales tax approved by San Bernardino County voters in 2004. On February 4, 2026, the SBCTA board would vote to reallocate the funds to other projects. Due to the SBCTA not responding to the demand to cure, the Montclair city council would file additional legal claims on February 6, 2026 and February 19, 2026, and would later pass an official agenda item opposing the county's upcoming renewal of Measure I at their meeting on March 16, 2026. On March 19, 2026, California State Assemblyman John Harabedian (D-Pasadena), representing California's 41st State Assembly district, would amend Assembly Bill AB 1678 (a bill he had previously introduced on February 2, 2026) to create the Claremontclair Authority, a new, single-purpose state authority designed to seize the assets along the right of way within San Bernardino County to construct the remaining 1.1-mile-long (1.8 km) Claremont–Montclair segment. In response, the SBCTA board of directors would unanimously vote to oppose AB 1678 at its meeting on April 1, 2026, alleging that the bill would introduce "legal and financial risks", limit the agency's oversight on the project, and force it to pay for operations and maintenance without the ability to negotiate terms. The bill would later die in committee. In September 2026, Montclair filed a lawsuit against SBCTA.

=== Construction ===
On December 2, 2017, officials broke ground for Phase 2B in a ceremony at Citrus College. The cost of the project was estimated at $1.5 billion. Completion of Phase 2B (including the Montclair Transit Center) was expected by early 2026. On July 10, 2020, major construction began on Phase 2B, building four stations from Azusa to Pomona. The first part of the construction focused on reconstructing the 28 at-grade crossings and relocating utilities. Gladstone Street in San Dimas was the first one to begin. Nearly all reconstructions commenced and finished in late 2022. As of June 2023, the at-grade crossing reconstructions were complete.

The freight/light rail bridges over channels and washes began in 2021, relocating and building new bridges to facilitate the freight and the A Line (then known as the L Line). These bridges were the first to finish as they didn't impact vehicular traffic. The light rail bridges, crossing major streets, began briefly. As required by the California Public Utilities Commission (CPUC), the light rail crossing at Foothill Boulevard, Route 66, Lone Hill Boulevard, and Bonita/Cataract Ave needed to be grade-separated (light rail only) with a flyover bridge. Those bridges feature the neighborhood's citrus design and includes local artwork. All of these components were complete by June 2023.

The more complex component was the freight track relocation. The freight originally existed in the middle of the corridor, leaving no room for the light rail extension. To create space, the construction authority relocated it to the north side (south side west of Lone Hill Boulevard) of the alignment. It was complete by October 2022. With the relocation work finished, crews began work on the light rail system by installing the overhead line, train control systems, and the light rail track. On June 24, 2023, an event held in La Verne culminated in the installation of the 230,630th rail clip (rail clips permanently attach the steel rail to the concrete railroad ties), officially completing major construction for the new light rail tracks from Glendora to Pomona.

The extension to Pomona reached substantial completion on January 3, 2025. Following this, Foothill Gold Line transferred ownership of the segment to Metro, who conducted pre-revenue testing along the segment. Pre-revenue testing lasted through August 2025, with the extension opening on September 19, 2025.

== Proposed extension to Ontario International Airport ==
There has been past interest in extending the Gold Line (now the A Line) from the Montclair Transit Center in Montclair to Ontario International Airport. Currently, no active proposals exist to plan or construct this extension.

=== City of Ontario ===
In 2006, when the city of Ontario joined the Foothill Gold Line Construction Authority, city leaders pushed to further extend the line to Ontario International Airport.

On March 9, 2009, the city passed a resolution affirming their support for this extension. The extension would be 7.5 miles (12.1 km) in length.

=== Studies ===
In 2008, the Foothill Gold Line Construction Authority commissioned a study by KOA Corporation to determine the feasibility of such an extension, which they dubbed "Phase 2C." The study found the extension would be feasible and provided several alignment alternatives. The extension would be between 7 miles (11 km) and 15 miles (24 km) and add up to four new stations, depending on the chosen alignment.

In November 2014, the San Bernardino Associated Governments (SANBAG), the precursor to the San Bernardino County Transportation Authority (SBCTA), conducted a study focused on better serving Ontario International Airport via public transport. Out of the six alternatives narrowed down from 32 that were more closely studied, one of these alternatives included "Alternative D-1", which proposed extending the Gold Line from the Montclair Transit Center along the San Bernardino Line until Cucamonga Creek, which the line would then follow to terminate at Ontario International Airport.

In October 2018, the Southern California Association of Governments (SCAG), in cooperation with the SBCTA and the Los Angeles Metro, conducted a transit and rail planning study for the corridor connecting the eastern San Gabriel Valley in Los Angeles County with the western San Bernardino Valley in San Bernardino County. This study considered two options for the "LRT Alternative", including extensions of the Gold Line to Ontario International Airport, the "Arterial Option" and the "Cucamonga Creek Option". The Arterial Option followed Indian Hill Boulevard and Holt Boulevard, while the Cucamonga Creek Option had the same routing as Alternative D-1 in the 2014 study.

=== Legislative attempts ===
In January 2020, California State Assemblyman Chris Holden (D-Pasadena), representing California's 41st State Assembly district, introduced Assembly Bill AB 2011. The measure would have formed the West San Bernardino County Rail Construction Authority, which would have designed and constructed the extension from Montclair to Ontario International Airport.

Holden would be aided by California State Senator Anthony Portantino (D-La Cañada Flintridge), representing California's 25th senatorial district, who introduced his bill, SB 1390, on February 21, 2020, which went even further and would have transferred taxpayer funds and land owned by the SBCTA within the proposed rail right of way to a state-created independent construction authority.

Both state legislators presented their bills to the SBCTA board of directors at the March 7, 2020, board meeting. The board voted to oppose both bills and passed a motion reasserting itself as the sole authority to plan, design, and build new mass transit projects in San Bernardino County. Despite this, both bills were supported by the Foothill Gold Line Construction Authority.

Neither bill was able to pass the state legislature. On May 18, 2020, the SBCTA ceased negotiations on a memorandum of understanding (MoU) on the extension, following Holden committing against further action on his legislative proposal, killing these attempts at the project.

=== Proposed alternative ===
As a cost-effective solution compared to the proposed extension, estimated at around $1–1.5 billion, SBCTA and Ontario International Airport were in the process of trying to implement a tunnel with autonomous, zero-emission vehicles on an "on-demand" basis from the Metrolink San Bernardino Line's Rancho Cucamonga station to Ontario International Airport.

Initially, The Boring Company proposed constructing a single 2.8-mile (4.5 km) tunnel similar to the Las Vegas Convention Center Loop that would cost $60 million. However, the company eventually dropped out of the project because they refused to submit another refined proposal.

Despite this, the SBCTA moved forward with plans on the project. The new plans for the project included two 4.2-mile (6.8 km) tunnels that would cost roughly $492 million. The SBCTA selected HNTB as their new contractor to design, build, and maintain the project. However, the project was canceled by the SBCTA board of directors at its December 3, 2025 board meeting due to escalating costs.
