= L Line (Los Angeles Metro) =

Former light rail line

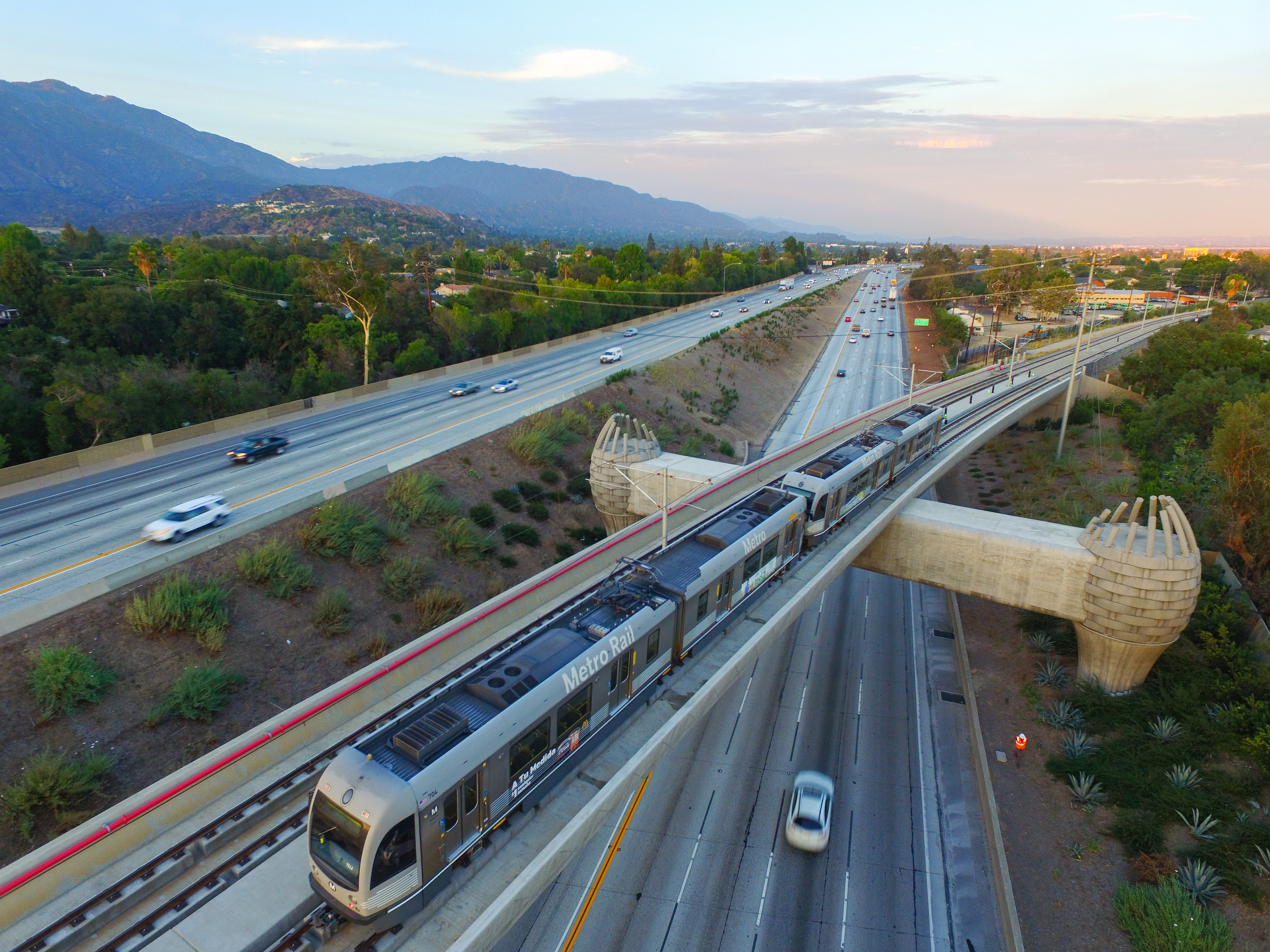
- Foothill Freeway overpass east of Sierra Madre Villa station, 2015

Overview
- Other name: Gold Line (2003–2020)
- Status: Defunct, split between A and E lines
- Owner: Los Angeles Metro
- Line number: 804
- Termini: APU/Citrus College; Atlantic
- Stations: 26
- Website: Archived 2023-04-06 at the Wayback Machine

Service
- Type: Light rail
- System: Los Angeles Metro Rail
- Depot(s): Division 21 (Elysian Park); Division 24 (Monrovia)
- Rolling stock: Siemens P2000, AnsaldoBreda P2550 or Kinki Sharyo P3010 running in 2 or 3 car consists
- Ridership: 5,907,262 (2022) ▲18.2%

History
- Opened: July 26, 2003; 23 years ago
- Closed: June 16, 2023; 3 years ago

Technical
- Line length: 31 miles (49.9 km)
- Num of tracks: 2
- Character: Mostly at-grade in private right-of-way, with some street-running, elevated and underground sections
- Track gauge: 4 ft 8 1/2 in (1,435 mm) standard gauge
- Electrification: Overhead line, 750 V DC
- Operating speed: 55 mph (89 km/h) (max.)
Route map
L Line highlighted in gold

The L Line and Gold Line are former designations for sections of the current Los Angeles Metro Rail system, a single light rail line of 31 miles (50 km) that provided service between Azusa and East Los Angeles via the northeastern corner of Downtown Los Angeles, serving several destinations and neighborhoods, including Little Tokyo, Union Station, the Southwest Museum, Chinatown, and Old Pasadena. The line, formerly one of seven in the system, entered service in 2003. The L Line served 26 stations (including two underground stations, and one open trench station).

In October 2020, the line was broken into two disconnected segments with the closure of the Little Tokyo/Arts District station in preparation for the opening of the Regional Connector tunnel. On June 16, 2023, the new tunnel opened, along with a new Little Tokyo/Arts District station, now below ground. As of that date, passengers may now transfer between the two segments of the former L Line at this station, now serviced by the A Line and the E Line, which took over the northern and southern sections of the L Line, respectively. Metro reassigned the L Line's gold color to the E Line (it had previously been designated light blue) when service changes went into effect.

East Los Angeles and Pasadena are no longer connected directly without transfers, but the system changes provided direct rail service to Long Beach on the A Line and Santa Monica on the E Line.

== Service description ==
=== Route description ===
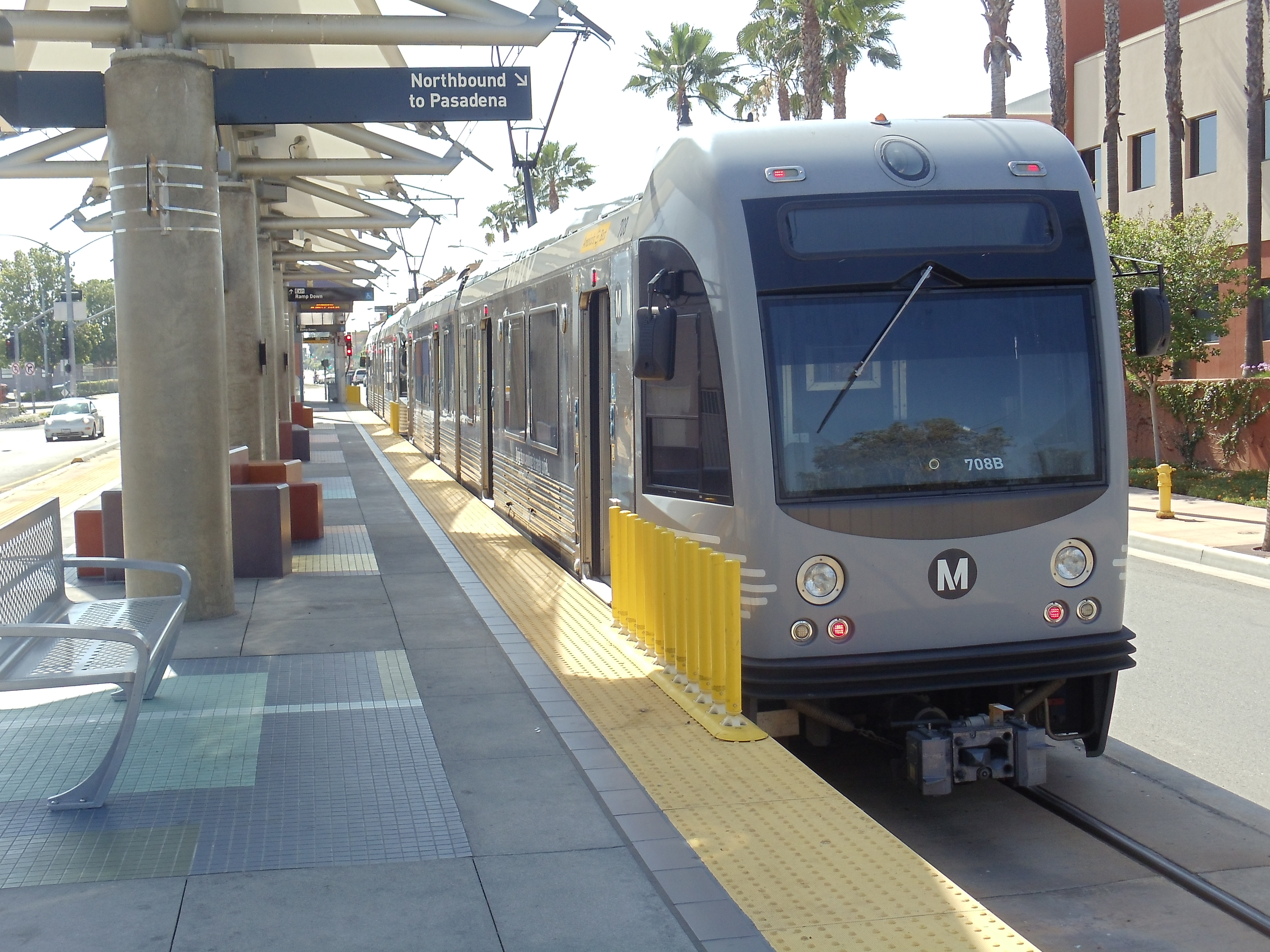
Northbound train at Atlantic station

The line's northern terminus was at APU/Citrus College station just west of Citrus Avenue and the two universities. The line ran west through Azusa before stopping at Azusa Downtown station at Azusa Avenue, north of Foothill Boulevard. Continuing west, the line crossed over the I-210 freeway and ran parallel to it, entering Irwindale before stopping at Irwindale station at Irwindale Avenue. After this station, the line continued west, crossing over the San Gabriel River and underneath the I-605 freeway, diverging from I-210 and entering Duarte, before stopping at Duarte/City of Hope station located on the north side of Duarte Road, across from the City of Hope National Medical Center.

Continuing west, the line paralleled Duarte Road, entering Monrovia, before diverging northwest just before arriving at Monrovia station. Entering Arcadia, the train crossed all street crossings on bridges except for First Avenue at the at-grade Arcadia station. Continuing west, the line reconverged with and entered the median of I-210 and continued west to Sierra Madre Villa station in Pasadena. Six stations served different parts of Pasadena, with three of them in the freeway's median. In Old Pasadena, the line traveled underground for almost half a mile, passing under Pasadena's main thoroughfare, Colorado Boulevard, which makes the Memorial Park station below grade. The station served most of Pasadena's fine dining, shops, malls, and civic center. The line continued south through downtown Pasadena and South Pasadena, primarily at grade. North of Highland Park, the route crossed over the Arroyo Seco Parkway (State Route 110) via the Santa Fe Arroyo Seco Railroad Bridge towards Highland Park.

After Highland Park station, the train ran in the median of Marmion Way, where trains went at only 20 miles per hour (32 km/h). After 50th Avenue, the L Line operated primarily at grade in its own right of way, except for a short underpass below Figueroa Street. From here, the route continued, with a handful of stations serving the hillside communities north of downtown, including Lincoln Heights, Mount Washington, the Southwest Museum of the American Indian. Northeast of Chinatown, the line crossed over the Los Angeles River on an elevated viaduct. Continuing on the elevated viaduct, the line stopped at Chinatown station before arriving at Union Station. At Union Station, passengers could transfer to the B and D rapid transit lines, Metrolink commuter rail, Amtrak, and buses. The entire section of the line north of Union Station followed the current and former right-of-way of the Pasadena Subdivision.

South of Union Station, the L Line crossed over US 101 on a curved elevated viaduct into Little Tokyo, where the line then serviced the former at-grade Little Tokyo/Arts District station. After this, the line then swerved right to enter the median of 1st Street, crossing the Los Angeles River again, entering the neighborhood of Boyle Heights. Here, the L Line then serviced Pico/Aliso station, before diving underground underneath 1st Street to service Mariachi Plaza station and Soto station. Adjacent to Evergreen Cemetery, the line then reemerged at-grade in the median of 1st Street before swerving to the east side of Indiana street to service Indiana station. After this, the line swerved again to enter the median of 3rd Street, entering East Los Angeles. Crossing underneath SR 60 and above I-710, the line then serviced Maravilla station, East LA Civic Center station, and Atlantic station, where the line terminated.

Prior to its discontinuation, the L Line was broken into two disconnected segments in October 2020, with the closure of the segment between Union Station and Pico/Aliso station, including the closure of Little Tokyo/Arts District station. This was done in preparation for the opening of the Regional Connector, which opened on June 16, 2023. Prior to this date, riders seeking to travel between the then disconnected segments of the L Line had to use a temporary bus shuttle to make the connection.

=== Hours and frequency ===
As of 2023, before the L Line was subsumed into the A and E lines, L Line trains ran every day between approximately 4:30 a.m. and 12:15 a.m. Trains operated every 10 minutes during peak hours Monday through Friday, and every twelve minutes during the daytime on weekdays and all day on the weekends. Evening service (after 7 p.m.) was every 20 minutes.

=== Speed ===
L Line trains traveled at a maximum speed of 55 miles per hour (89 km/h). It took 48 minutes to travel its 29-mile (47 km) length, at an average speed of 26.2 mph (42.2 km/h) over its length. The L Line was particularly slow through the Highland Park area, where trains reach speeds of only 20 mph (32 km/h) while operating in a street running section on Marmion Way.

=== Station listing ===
The following table lists the stations of the former L Line, from north to south.

Station	Date Opened	City/Neighborhood	Major connections and notes
APU/Citrus College	March 5, 2016	Azusa	Park and ride: 200 spaces
Azusa Downtown	March 5, 2016	Azusa	Park and ride: 521 spaces
Irwindale	March 5, 2016	Irwindale	Park and ride: 350 spaces
Duarte/City of Hope	March 5, 2016	Duarte	Park and ride: 125 spaces
Monrovia	March 5, 2016	Monrovia	Park and ride: 350 spaces
Arcadia	March 5, 2016	Arcadia	Park and ride: 300 spaces
Sierra Madre Villa	July 26, 2003	Pasadena	Park and ride: 965 spaces
Allen	July 26, 2003	Pasadena	
Lake	July 26, 2003	Pasadena	Park and ride: 22 spaces
Memorial Park	July 26, 2003	Pasadena	
Del Mar	July 26, 2003	Pasadena	Park and ride: 610 spaces
Fillmore	July 26, 2003	Pasadena	Park and ride: 155 spaces
South Pasadena	July 26, 2003	South Pasadena	Park and ride: 142 spaces
Highland Park	July 26, 2003	Los Angeles (Highland Park)	
Southwest Museum	July 26, 2003	Los Angeles (Mount Washington)	
Heritage Square	July 26, 2003	Los Angeles (Montecito Heights)	Park and ride: 129 spaces
Lincoln/Cypress	July 26, 2003	Los Angeles (Lincoln Heights/Cypress Park)	Park and ride: 94 spaces
Chinatown	July 26, 2003	Los Angeles (Chinatown)	
Union Station	July 26, 2003	Los Angeles (Downtown)	Amtrak, LAX FlyAway and Metrolink; Paid parking: 3,000 spaces
Little Tokyo/Arts District	November 15, 2009	Los Angeles (Little Tokyo/Arts District)	At-grade station closed on October 24, 2020
Pico/Aliso	November 15, 2009	Los Angeles (Boyle Heights)	
Mariachi Plaza	November 15, 2009	Los Angeles (Boyle Heights)	
Soto	November 15, 2009	Los Angeles (Boyle Heights)	
Indiana	November 15, 2009	East Los Angeles	Park and ride: 42 spaces
Maravilla	November 15, 2009	East Los Angeles	
East LA Civic Center	November 15, 2009	East Los Angeles	
Atlantic	November 15, 2009	East Los Angeles	Park and ride: 289 spaces

=== Ridership ===
Following the extension to East Los Angeles in 2009, the line's ridership increased to almost 30,000 daily boardings. As of October 2012, the average weekday daily boardings for the L Line stood at 42,417, and as of December 2014 the average daily weekday boardings had increased to 44,707. Following the extension to Azusa, ridership rose to 49,238 as of May 2016.

Annual ridership
Year	Ridership	%±
2009	7,629,332	—
2010	10,800,092	+41.6%
2011	11,935,709	+10.5%
2012	13,142,757	+10.1%
2013	13,415,083	+2.1%
2014	13,828,323	+3.1%
2015	14,267,244	+3.2%
2016	16,483,545	+15.5%
2017	16,546,196	+0.4%
2018	15,956,214	−3.6%
2019	15,090,394	−5.4%
2020	6,786,457	−55.0%
2021	4,999,638	−26.3%
2022	5,907,262	+18.2%
Source: Metro

View chart definition.

== History ==
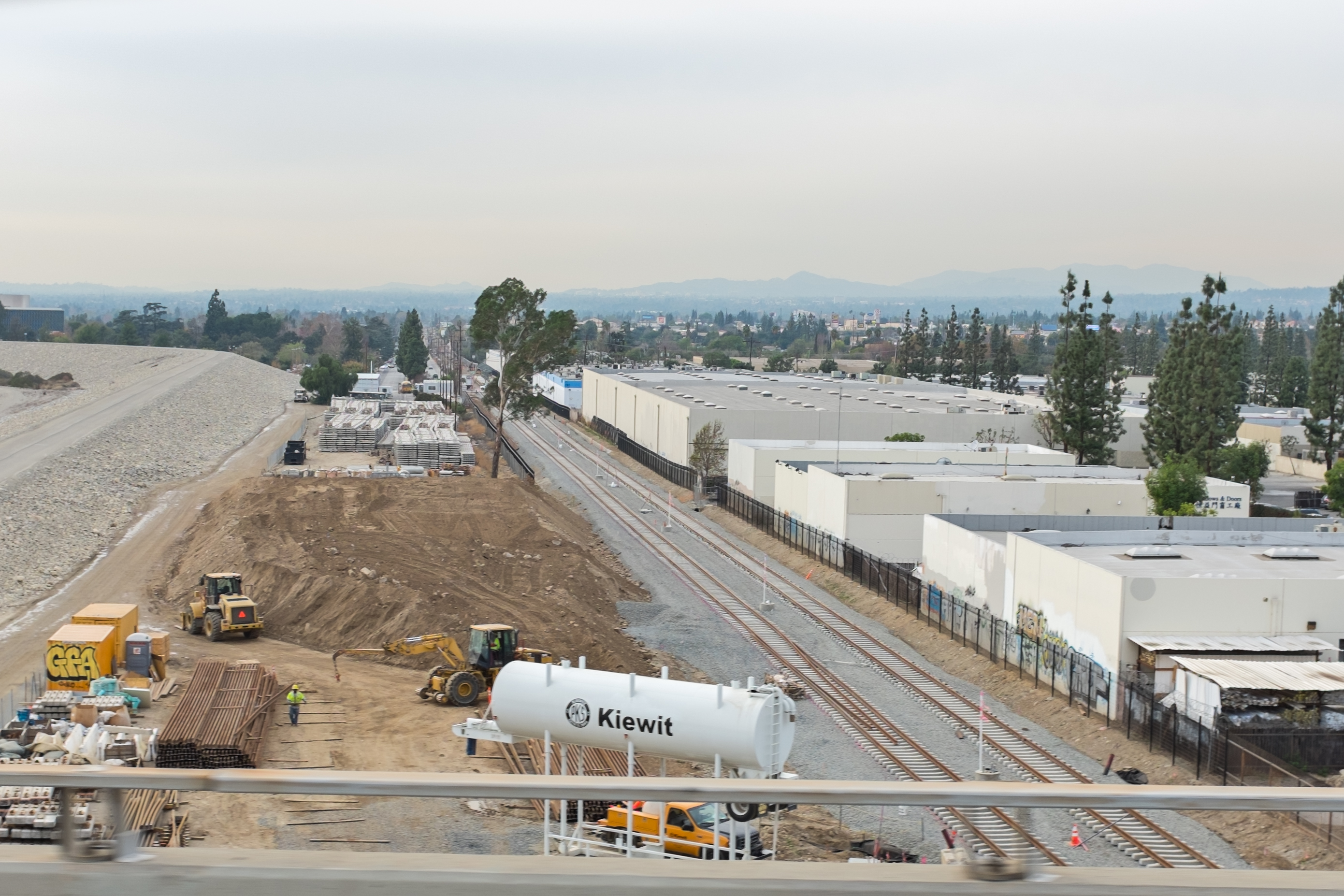
Construction of the L Line, near Duarte in 2014. Tracks are laid, but the overhead catenary has not been installed yet.

Much of the L Line's right-of-way through the San Gabriel Valley was built by the Los Angeles and San Gabriel Valley Railroad in 1885, eventually taken over by the Atchison, Topeka and Santa Fe Railway, as part of the Pasadena Subdivision, which saw Amtrak service until 1994, when construction began on the conversion to light rail. The project was originally called the "Pasadena Metro Blue Line," and planners envisioned extending the existing Blue Line from Long Beach, but when a ban on sales tax spending on subway tunnels passed in 1998, the project became a separate line terminating at Union Station.

The Gold Line opened between Union Station and Sierra Madre Villa station in East Pasadena on July 26, 2003.

Following a new right-of-way, the Gold Line Eastside Extension extended the line east between Union Station and East Los Angeles, opening on November 15, 2009.

Phase 2A (the section between LA and Pasadena was Phase 1) of the Foothill Extension, running between Sierra Madre Villa station and APU/Citrus College station in Azusa, opened on March 5, 2016.

=== Regional Connector ===
The Regional Connector Transit Project constructed a 1.9-mile (3.1 km) light rail tunnel across Downtown Los Angeles that connected the L Line with the A and E lines. The project finally completed the late 1990s vision of the "Pasadena Blue Line," connecting the northern (Union Station–Azusa) segment of the L Line to the A Line (formerly the Blue Line), which runs between Los Angeles and Long Beach. The southern (Pico/Aliso–East LA) segment was combined with the previously existing E Line, which ran between Downtown Los Angeles and Santa Monica. The new east–west line kept the E Line name but uses the L Line's gold color.

The at-grade Little Tokyo/Arts District station was demolished in 2020 and was rebuilt as a subway station approximately 500 feet (152 meters) south and on the opposite side of Alameda from its former location. Between 2020-2023, shuttles connected the two portions of the line.

The groundbreaking for constructing the Regional Connector took place on September 30, 2014, and it opened on June 16, 2023.

After the Regional Connector opened, the L Line became the first letter designation on the Los Angeles Metro Rail system to be permanently discontinued.

== Operations ==
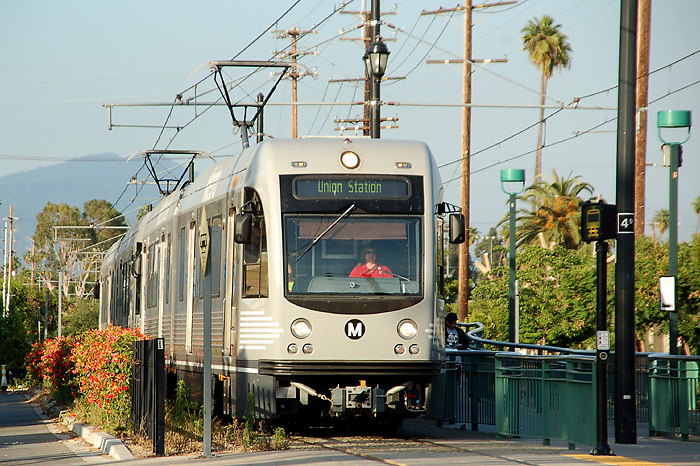
AnsaldoBreda P2550 train at Highland Park in 2008

The L Line was operated by Los Angeles Metro.

=== Maintenance facilities ===
The L Line fleet is stored and maintained and is operated at Division 21 and Division 24. Division 21 is located on Vin Scully Drive (Elysian Park Drive) just north of North Broadway, overlooking the Los Angeles River, and Division 24 is located south of the I-210 freeway in Monrovia.

As of April 2023, Division 11 and Division 14 have been added to the operations of the L Line. Division 11 is situated at the end of 208th Street between I-710 and the Los Angeles River in North Long Beach within the A Line. Division 14 is situated between Centinela Avenue and Stewart Street in Santa Monica within the E Line.

=== Rolling stock ===
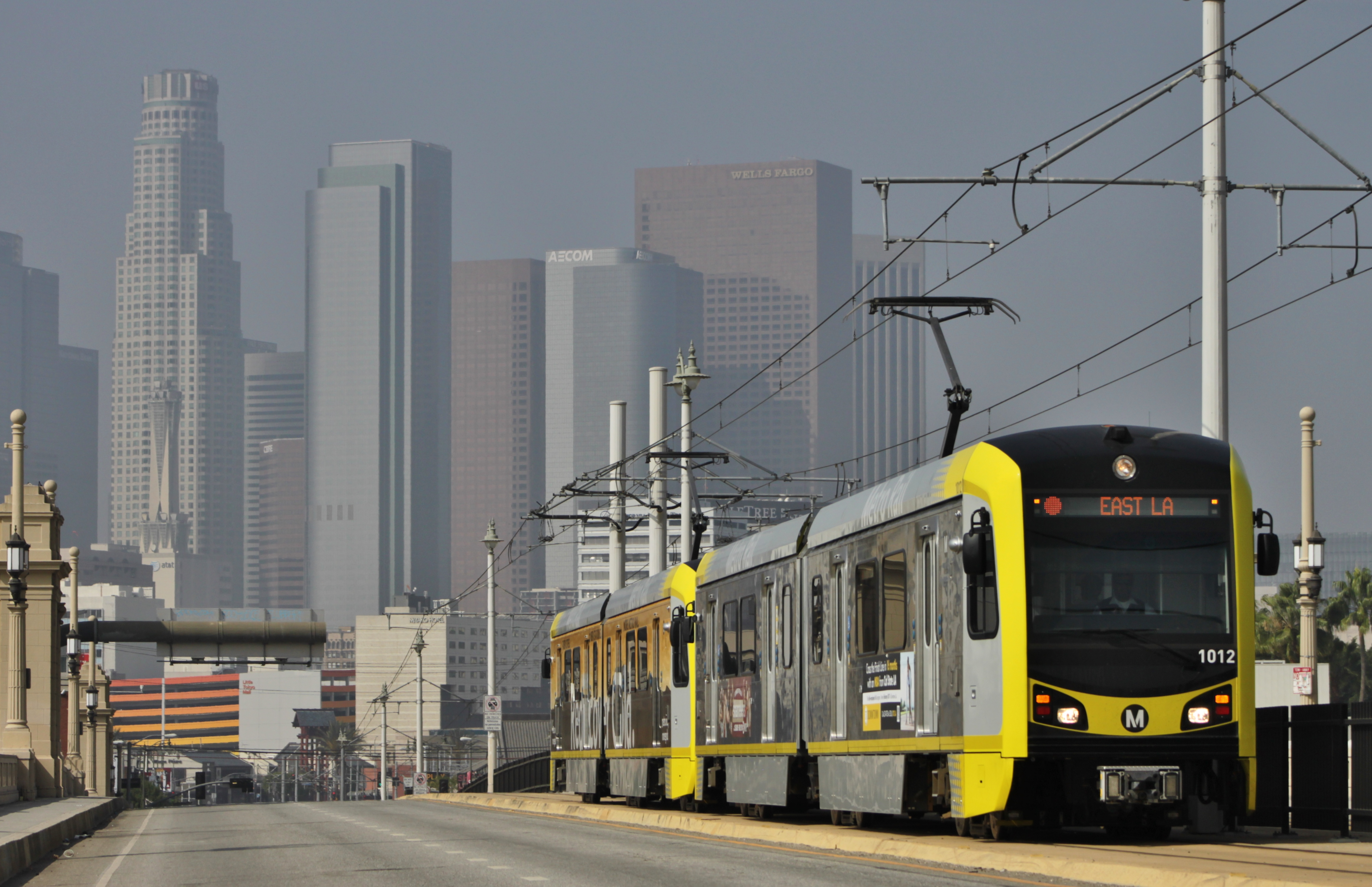
An eastbound trainset on the then-Gold Line using two Kinki Sharyo P3010s

L Line trains are typically two-car trains off-peak. During peak hours on weekdays, some three-car trains run. On New Year's Day, the L Line uses three-car trains for service to the Tournament of Roses Parade and the Rose Bowl Game.

Like the A, C, E, and K lines, trains are composed of high-floor articulated light rail vehicles (LRVs). The AnsaldoBreda P2550, the Kinki Sharyo P3010, or the Siemens P2000 operated the line. The P2000 initially operated the line in 2003 until 2012 when the fleet was transferred to increase availability at the A Line yard for service as a result of the inauguration of the E Line. During testing of the Regional Connector, the P2000 returned to L Line service as a result of training operations for post–Regional Connector service. Rolling stock is now shared between the A and E Lines, which subsumed the trackage of the L Line.

== Incidents ==
The following noteworthy incidents occurred on the L Line during its service history.

- September 11, 2007 – A driver was critically injured and six passengers, including an LA County Deputy Sheriff and the train operator, suffered minor injuries when a pickup truck ran a red light at Avenue 55 and Marmion Way before being hit by a train.
- September 21, 2007 – Six people suffered non-life-threatening injuries, including two minor injuries, after an SUV broke off the crossing arms and was struck by a northbound train (car 243) at Avenue 50 and Marmion Way in Mt. Washington. The vehicle caught fire, and a train section was also burnt. It was claimed that the female SUV driver had tried to beat the train. A resident extinguished the fire in the car with a garden hose before Los Angeles Fire arrived. The train that suffered fire damage was repaired and later placed on the Metro C Line.
- October 13, 2007 – Service was suspended for 12 hours after a big rig hit the center divider of the eastbound Foothill Freeway at Sierra Madre Boulevard and went on the tracks.
- August 26, 2011 – An altercation between passengers resulted in a non-fatal stabbing during a trip through Pasadena. The train was stopped at Memorial Park station, where the victim was transported to a hospital, and the suspect was detained.
- April 24, 2014 – Service was suspended between the Lake and Sierra Madre Villa stations after a collision between two tractor-trailers on the eastbound Foothill Freeway resulted in one vehicle landing on the line, damaging the rails and overhead wires. Full return to normal service took several days.
- March 6, 2016 – Service between Allen and Arcadia stations was disrupted for most of the evening, resuming Monday morning, one day after the opening of the Foothill Extension when a semi-truck driver lost control and sent his trailer onto the tracks.
- February 20, 2018 – A high-speed pursuit ended when the pursuit suspect drove into the tunnel between Soto and Indiana stations, suspending service.
- April 26, 2018 – An accident on the Foothill Freeway sent a FedEx truck onto the tracks between Lake and Memorial Park stations, damaging the rails and overhead wires.
- November 27, 2018 – A man was fatally stabbed near the Azusa station.
- May 7, 2022 – A man was sprayed with a flammable liquid before being lit on fire at Lake Station. The man was seriously injured, but survived.

== See also ==
- Los Angeles and San Gabriel Valley Railroad
