= Los Angeles and San Gabriel Valley Railroad =

Early railroad from Pasadena to downtown Los Angeles

The Los Angeles and San Gabriel Valley Railroad was a railroad founded on September 5, 1883, by James F. Crank with the goal of bringing a rail line to Pasadena, California from downtown Los Angeles, the line opened in 1886. Los Angeles and San Gabriel Valley Railroad was sold and consolidated on May 20, 1887, into the California Central Railway. In 1889 this was consolidated into Southern California Railway Company. On Jan. 17, 1906 Southern California Railway was sold to the Atchison, Topeka and Santa Fe Railway and called the Pasadena Subdivision. The main line closed in 1994. The railroad later reopened as the MTA Gold Line Light Rail service in July 2003.

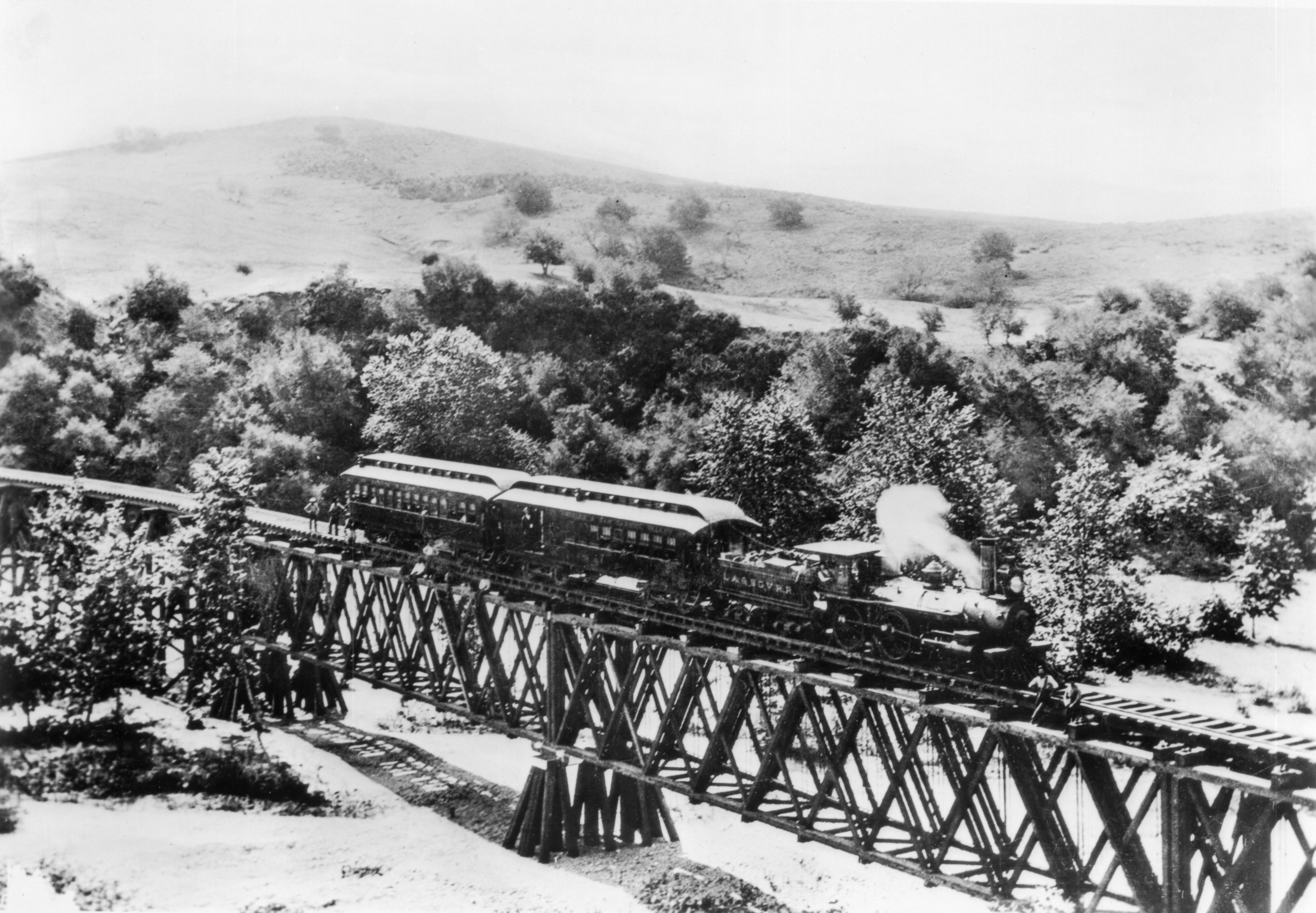
1885 view of the Los Angeles and San Gabriel Railroad crossing the Arroyo Seco near Garvanza - Highland Park

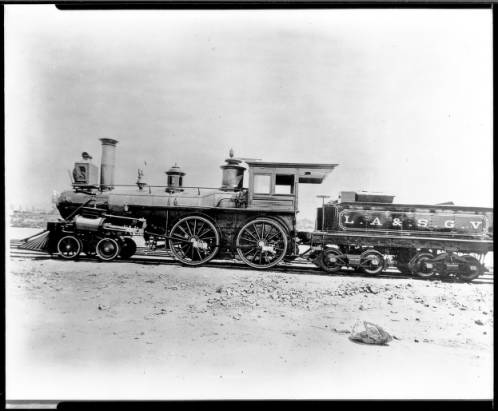
Los Angeles and San Gabriel Railroad train 1884 at Aliso Street & Anderson Street, LA, CA

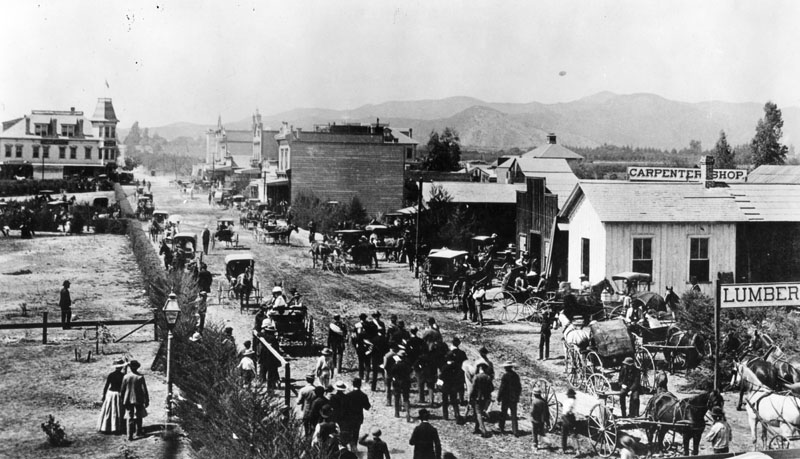
People of Pasadena celebrating the opening of the Los Angeles and San Gabriel Valley Railroad with a parade on September 30, 1886, on Colorado Street.

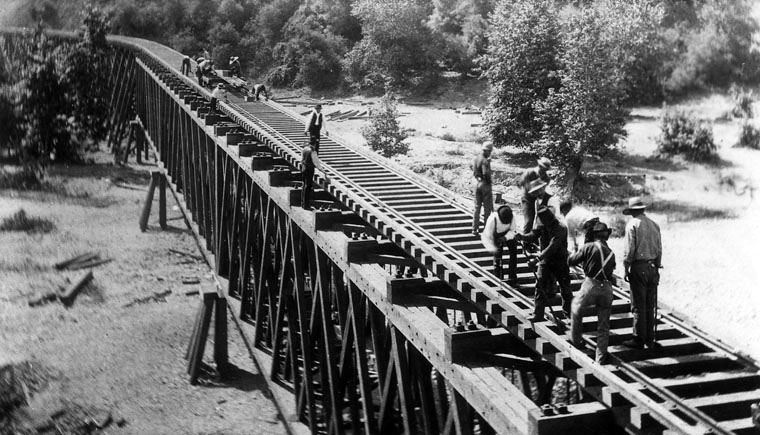
Two groups of men building the railroad over the trestle on the Los Angeles and San Gabriel Railroad, crossing into Pasadena in 1885.

== History ==
James F. Crank founded the Los Angeles and San Gabriel Valley Railroad on Sept. 5, 1883 with the goal of bringing a rail line to Pasadena from downtown Los Angeles. Los Angeles and San Gabriel Valley Railroad sold stock to get funds to build the new rail line, Lucky Baldwin purchased a large share of stocks, knowing the rail line would open markets for goods from his Rancho Santa Anita. James F. Crank's Los Angeles and San Gabriel Valley Railroad had a slow start. The first rail track was laid in Pasadena in 1884, but the first contractor went bankrupt by the end of 1884. In January 1885, a new contractor started working on the line and the second rail bridge that was needed. A test train ran on Sept. 14 and on September 16, 1885. A grand celebration was held in Pasadena for the completion of the Los Angeles and San Gabriel Valley Railroad from Downtown LA to Lamanda Park in East Pasadena. The rail line went from downtown Los Angeles through the Arroyo Seco to Pasadena. The railroad train crossed the Arroyo Seco just north of Garvanza in Highland Park. The first Pasadena Rail Station was built in 1887 was wooden structure, it was later replaced in 1934. The rail line started a boom in Pasadena, the Hotel Green was started by Edward C. Webster in 1887 and finished in 1888 by George Gill Green. The hotel patrons arrived by train at the adjacent Pasadena station. The hotel still stands on South Raymond Avenue in Old Pasadena.

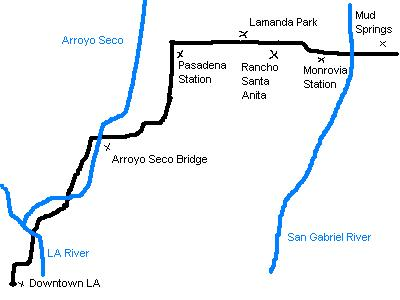
Map of the 1886 Los Angeles and San Gabriel Valley Railroad

With the goal of connecting all of the San Gabriel Valley, in November 1886 the Los Angeles and San Gabriel Valley Railroad started building a line West from Mud Springs (what is now San Dimas). By January 1887 the rail had crossed the San Gabriel River in Azusa. In 1887 the line continued to Monrovia where a wooden structure rail station depot was built. This structure was replaced by the Santa Fe Depot, which was built in 1926. In February 1887, twenty land owners had a meeting with the Los Angeles and San Gabriel Valley Railroad in Judge Fiery's office. The meeting was about buying land to complete the rail line through Pomona. At the same meeting land was deeded for the rail line through Claremont by C.F. Loop and others. A rail station was built in Pomona, there was debate over whether to call it North Pomona Station, Palomares Station, or Palermo Station. Los Angeles and San Gabriel Valley Railroad was sold and consolidated on May 20, 1887, into the California Central Railway. In 1889 this was consolidated into Southern California Railway Company. There was a land boom along the new rail line. In Mud Springs, the land boom resulted in the formation of the San Jose Ranch Company. San Jose Ranch Company and M. L. Wicks laid out streets. Small businesses opened in Mud Springs, and soon the city took its new name, San Dimas. The Azusa Land and Water Company sold land in Azusa. A new town near the tracks called Alosta popped up near Azusa and Southern Glendora, developed by former LAPD Chief and Los Angeles County Sheriff George Gard.

The Monrovia Land and Water Company sold land in Monrovia. James F. Crank joined with William Newton Monroe and others in getting Rancho Santa Anita land from Lucky Baldwin in December 1885 to sell. The new rail line through the San Gabriel Valley was also a loom to the valley's citrus, nuts and fruit growers, with a new way to get their goods to market. The original 1887 Rancho Santa Anita station, later called the Arcadia Santa Fe Station was moved to the Fairplex's Rail Giants museum in 1969. On Jan. 17, 1906 Southern California Railway was sold to the Atchison, Topeka and Santa Fe Railway and called the Pasadena Subdivision.

Lamanda Park had a rail station for goods and passengers. Since Lamanda Park had many citrus groves and vineyards, Lamanda Park also had a long side rail line to provided shipping for these goods. Prohibition ended the wineries. The last Lamanda Park citrus packer was Sierra-Madre Lamanda Park Citrus Association, they boxed oranges, lemons, limes, and grapefruit. The packing house was at the corner of Walnut Street and San Gabriel Boulevard. The side rail line also brought lumber to Lamanda Park and later cars to the local dealers. The main line closed in 1994, but reopened in July 2003 as the MTA Gold Line Light Rail service.

== Santa Fe ==
Jay Gould and Collis Potter Huntington worked hard to keep the Santa Fe Railway out of the San Gabriel Valley. But in May 1887, the first Santa Fe train rolled into Los Angeles. Santa Fe had an expensive agreement to use Southern Pacific to run trains from Colton to Los Angeles. This agreement was used for a year and a half.

With the May 20, 1887 sale of the Los Angeles and San Gabriel Valley Railroad to the California Central Railway, (a subsidiary railroad of the Atchison, Topeka and Santa Fe Railway) the two lines where connected together at Mud Springs, completing the rail line from Chicago to Los Angeles through the San Gabriel Valley. Amtrak ran the Southwest Chief and Desert Wind over this line, but relocated the Desert Wind to the Fullerton Line in 1986. The Santa Fe line served the San Gabriel Valley until 1994, when the 1994 Northridge earthquake weakened the bridge in Arcadia. In the late 1990s construction of the L Line started and opened on July 26, 2003. Thus the old Los Angeles and San Gabriel Valley Railroad right of way (ROW) is still in use today. In 2013 construction on the old ROW started again with the Gold Line Foothill Extension project; the site of the original 1886 Monrovia station is under construction. The line will continue to the site of the old Azusa station, which opened in 2016. Santa Fe built a service line just south of the main line (The Second District of the AT&SF) in Pasadena, this ran along near Walnut Street from Eaton Canyon wash to Wilson Ave. This ROW has been sold off little by little. The raised grade for this line can still be seen on Sierra Madre Boulevard, just north Colorado Boulevard, near the VW dealer there. Lamanda Park had many citrus groves and vineyards, the station provided shipping for these goods. Prohibition ended the wineries. The last Citrus packer was Sierra-Madre Lamanda Park Citrus Association, they boxed oranges, lemons, limes, and grapefruit. The packing house was at the corner of Walnut Street and San Gabriel Boulevard. Service to Lamanda Park ended in the 1950s. The service line stopped at lumber yards and car dealers in Pasadena till it was abandoned in 1980.

== Photo gallery ==
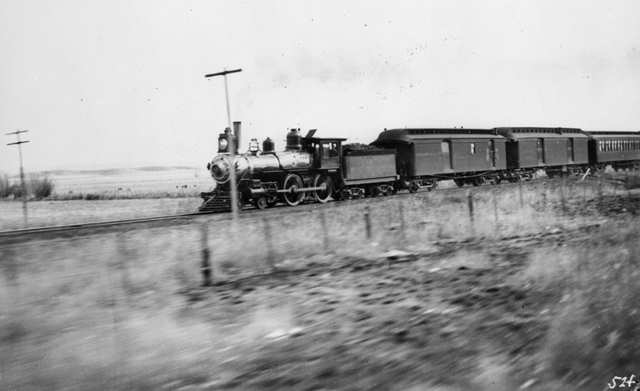
An AT&SF passenger train in operation, c. 1895

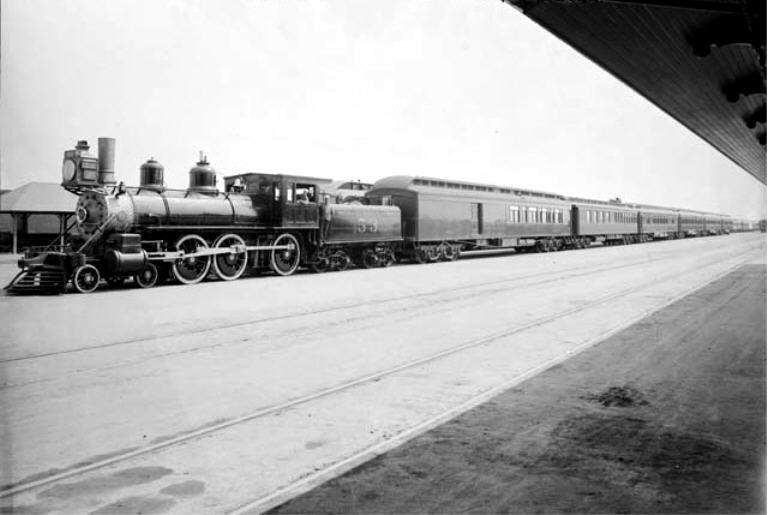
Santa Fe California Limited in Los Angeles, California with engine No. 53 at the LA's La Grande Station c. 1899

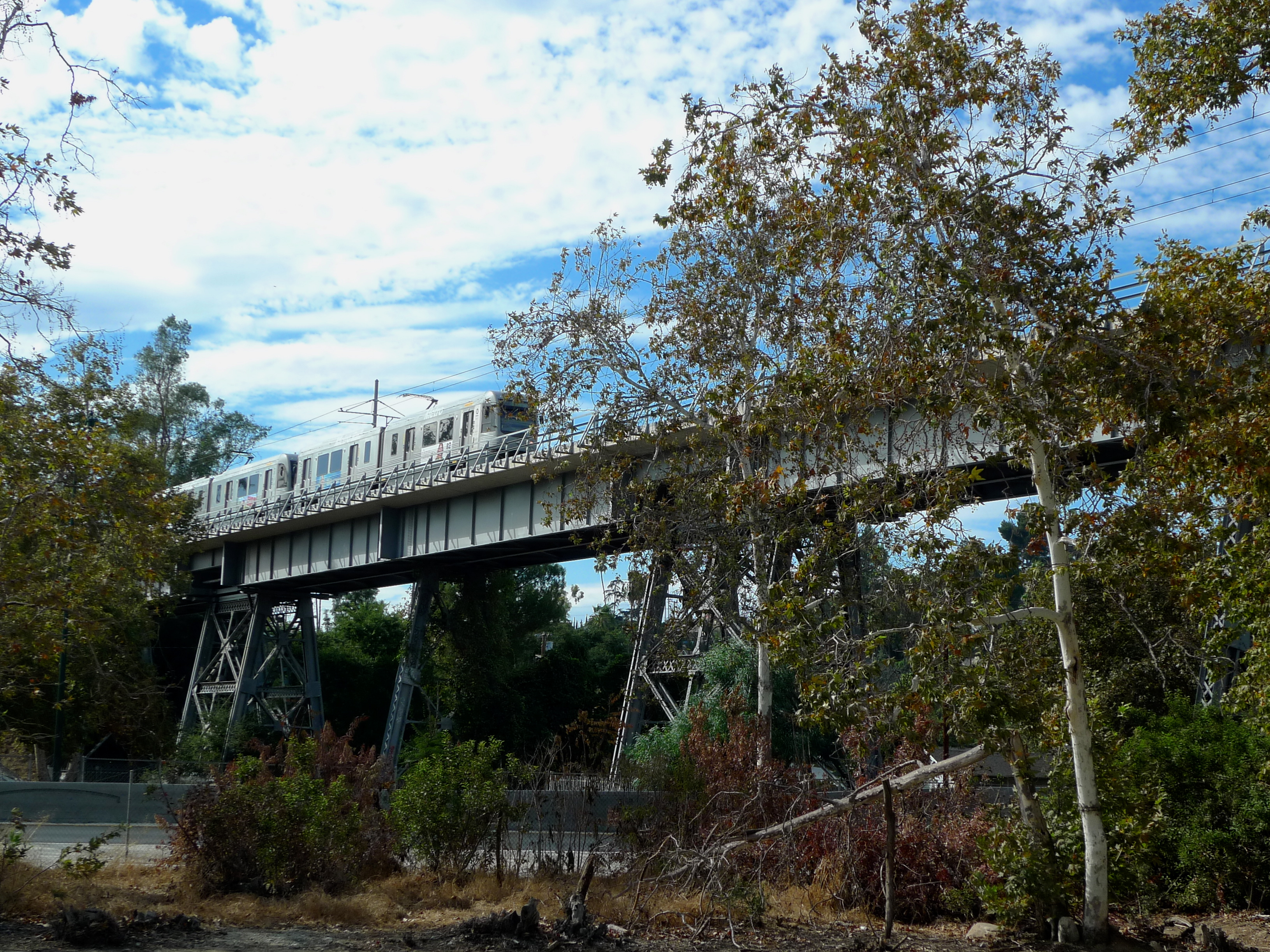
Santa Fe Arroyo Seco Railroad Bridge with a Gold line Tram crossing, this the 3rd bridge at the site of the original 1886 Los Angeles and San Gabriel Valley Railroad bridge, 2013

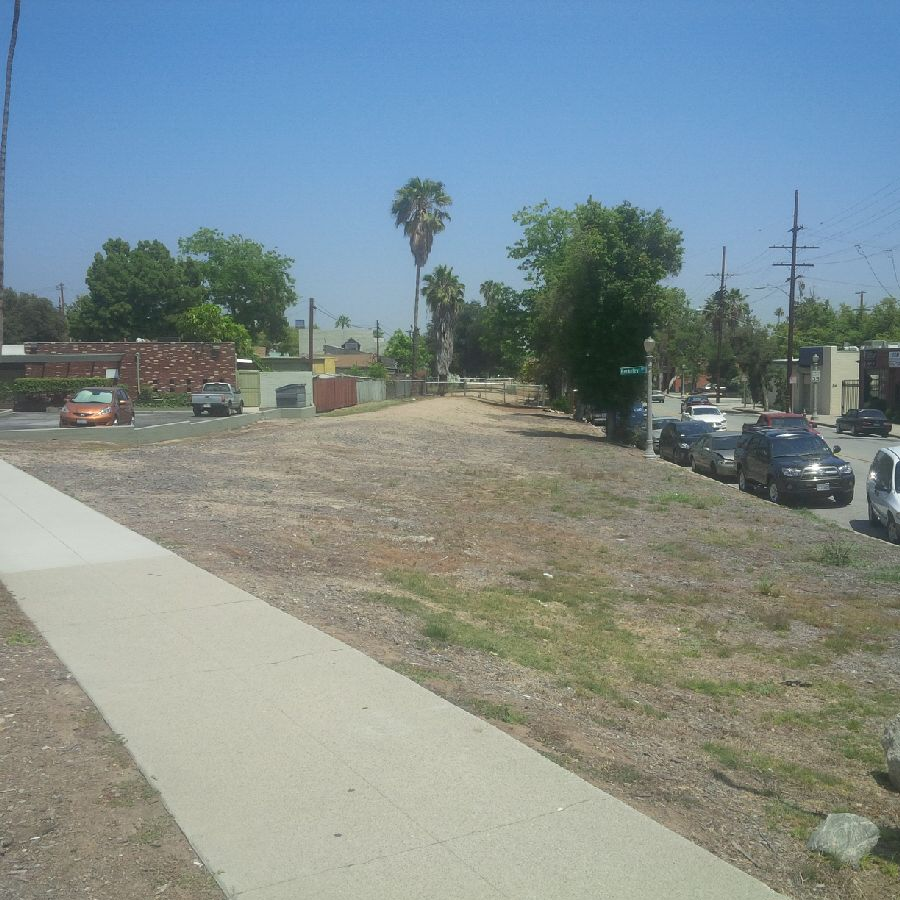
Right of Way of the Lamanda Park rail side line, used in past to load Lamanda Park's Wine and Citrus for market at Foothill and Walnut

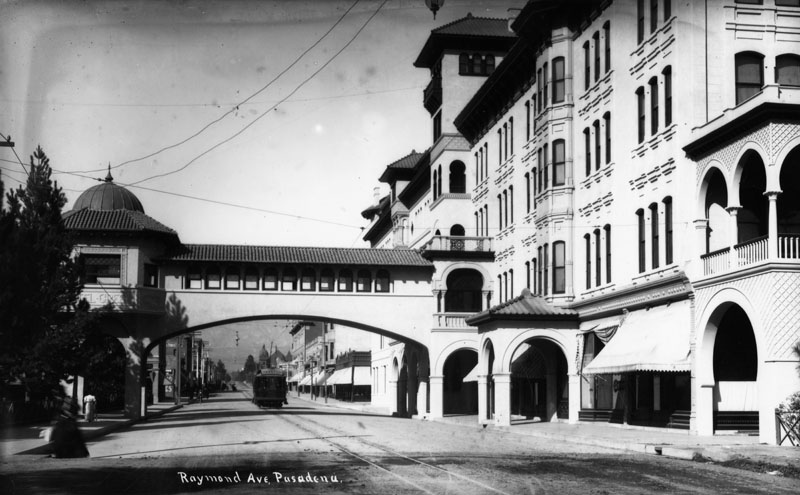
Hotel Green, 1900, with bridge to the Pasadena rail station

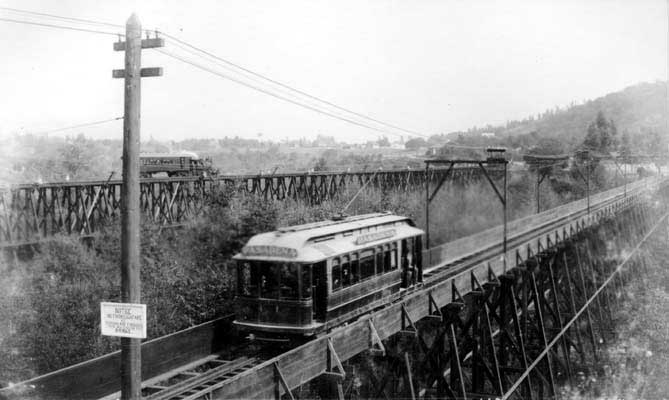
Pasadena and Los Angeles Electric Railway and Los Angeles and San Gabriel Valley Railroad train in the Arroyo Seco, 1895

== See also ==
- History of Trains in Pasadena
- History of rail transportation in California
- Southern Transcon
- Union Station (Los Angeles)
- Southwest Chief
- Rancho Santa Anita Depot
- Pacific Electric's Red Cars that connected with the rail lines.
- List of California railroads
