= Pasadena Subdivision =

Railroad branch line in California

The Pasadena Subdivision is the remnant branch line of the former Atchison, Topeka and Santa Fe Railway (AT&SF) Los Angeles Second District. The line currently branches off of Metrolink’s San Bernardino Line at CP Cambridge in Claremont. The line follows a generally east–west alignment, passing through the cities of Claremont, Pomona, La Verne, San Dimas, Glendora, and Azusa before coming to a truncated end in Irwindale. For most of its length, it shares the corridor with the Los Angeles Metro Rail’s A Line. Recent construction, known as the Foothill Extension Phase 2B, has seen the tracks out of service west of San Dimas for most of 2021.

== History ==
The line was initially built by the Los Angeles and San Gabriel Valley Railroad (LA&SGV) in 1885. LA&SGV was sold and consolidated on May 20, 1887, into the California Central Railway. In 1889 this was consolidated into Southern California Railway Company. On January 17, 1906, the Southern California Railway was sold to AT&SF.

Coupled with the San Bernardino and Los Angeles Railroad, it now was assigned as the Second District of the AT&SF Los Angeles Division. At one point, this line hosted up to 26 passenger trains each day, including the famed Super Chief and El Capitan. Priority AT&SF freight trains also used the line, usually westbound and local freight along the corridor.

With the coming of Amtrak in 1971, the line was used by the daily Super Chief (later renamed Southwest Limited, then Southwest Chief). The line also hosted the Desert Wind from 1979 until 1986, when it was rerouted to the San Bernardino Subdivision to avoid meets on the single-track line. Construction of the Gold Line (now the A Line) necessitated the abandonment of the western portion of the line. The eastbound Southwest Chief moved to the San Bernardino Subdivision on November 28, 1993, followed by the westbound on January 15, 1994, ending Amtrak service to both Pasadena and North Pomona. Amtrak and freight service were not expected to return to the city after the 1994 Northridge earthquake critically damaged a bridge over the 210 Freeway. Gold Line service began on July 26, 2003.

In 2013, reconstruction along the former roadbed from Sierra Madre Villa station to APU/Citrus College station began with the Gold Line Foothill Extension and was completed in late 2015. The line currently terminates at APU/Citrus College station, one mile (1.6 km) past the site of the former Azusa station (now served by Azusa Downtown station on the A Line); service started on March 5, 2016. The final planned phase of the light rail line's buildout will complete the reinstatement of passenger service along the corridor, though dedicated freight tracks still remain for BNSF services to industries in Irwindale.

== See also ==
- A Line (Los Angeles Metro)
- Foothill Extension
- Metrolink (California)
- San Bernardino Line
- Desert Wind
- Southwest Chief
