= APU/Citrus College station =

Light rail station in Azusa, California

APU/Citrus College
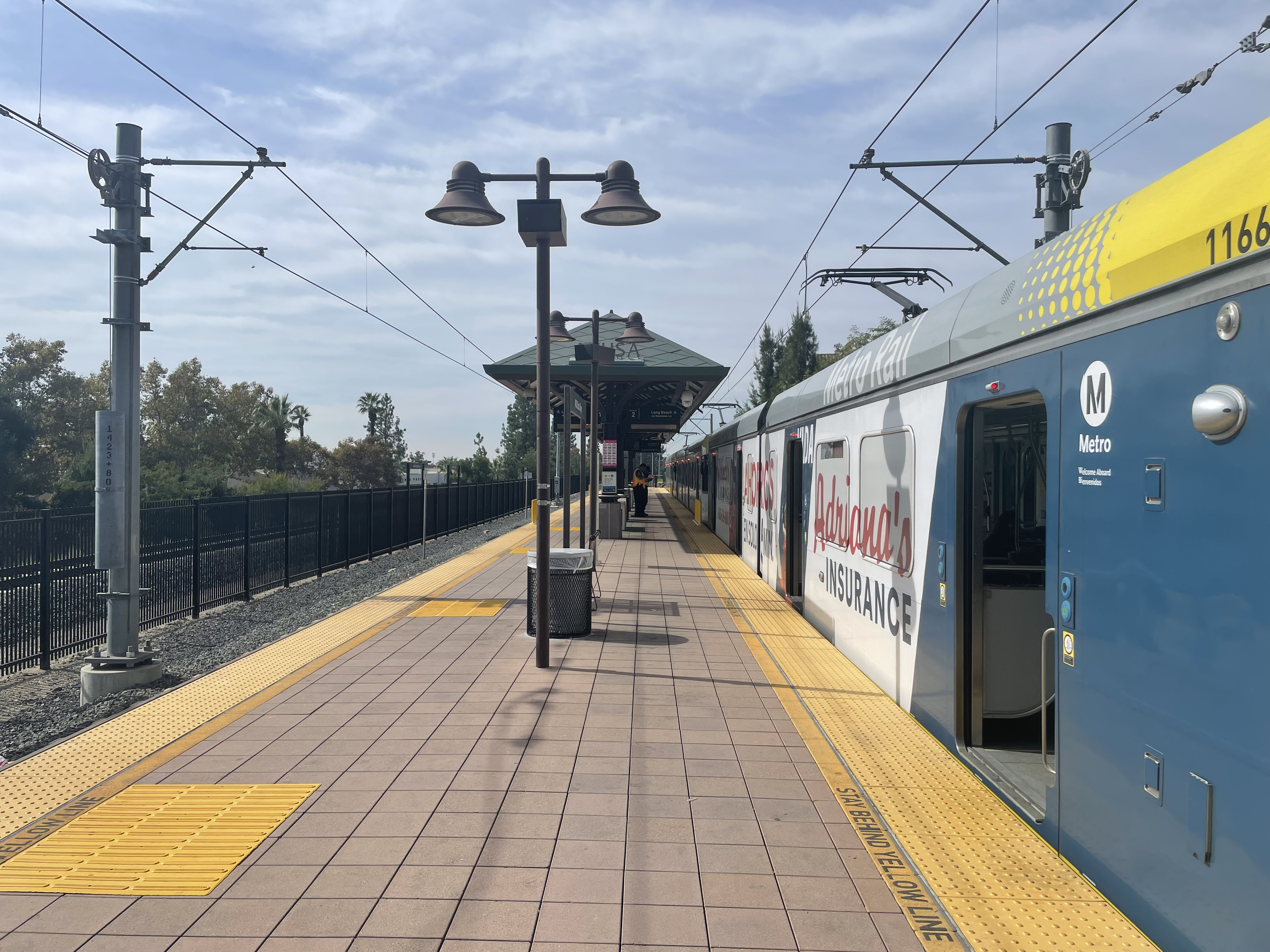
- APU/Citrus College station platform

General information
- Location: 6898 North Citrus Avenue; Azusa, California
- Coordinates: 34.1369°N 117.8901°W
- Owner: Los Angeles Metro
- Platforms: 1 island platform
- Tracks: 2
- Connections: Foothill Transit

Construction
- Structure type: At-grade
- Parking: 206 spaces
- Cycle facilities: Racks and lockers
- Accessible: Yes

History
- Opened: March 5, 2016; 10 years ago
- Former names: Azusa/Citrus, Citrus Avenue

Passengers
- FY 2026: 744 (avg. wkdy boardings)

Services
Preceding station	Metro Rail	Following station
Azusa Downtown toward Long Beach	A Line	Glendora toward Pomona
Former services
Preceding station	Metro Rail	Following station
Azusa Downtown toward East Los Angeles	L Line	Terminus
Preceding station	Pacific Electric	Following station
Azusa toward Pacific Electric Building	Monrovia–Glendora	La Fetra toward Glendora
Location

APU/Citrus College station is an at-grade light rail station on the A Line of the Los Angeles Metro Rail system. It is located between Palm Drive and Citrus Avenue, a block north of Foothill Boulevard, in Azusa, California. It is named after the nearby Azusa Pacific University (APU) and Citrus College.

This station opened on March 5, 2016, as part of Phase 2A of the Gold Line Foothill Extension Project, and served as the northern terminus of the A Line until the line was extended to Pomona on September 19, 2025.

Due to heavy rain in March 2016, the previously delayed underpass construction on North Citrus Avenue was flooded. The Citrus Avenue extension and underpass were finally opened in September 2016.

== Service ==
=== Hours and frequency ===
A Line service hours are from approximately 4:30 a.m. and 11:45 p.m. daily. Trains operate every 8 minutes during peak hours, Monday to Friday. Trains run every 10 minutes, during midday on weekdays and weekends, from 9:00 a.m. to 7:00 p.m. Night and early morning service is approximately every 20 minutes every day.

=== Connections ===
As of September 19, 2024, the following connections are available:

- Foothill Transit: 281, 284, 488, 690
