= Pomona–North station =

Rail station in Pomona, California, US

Pomona–North
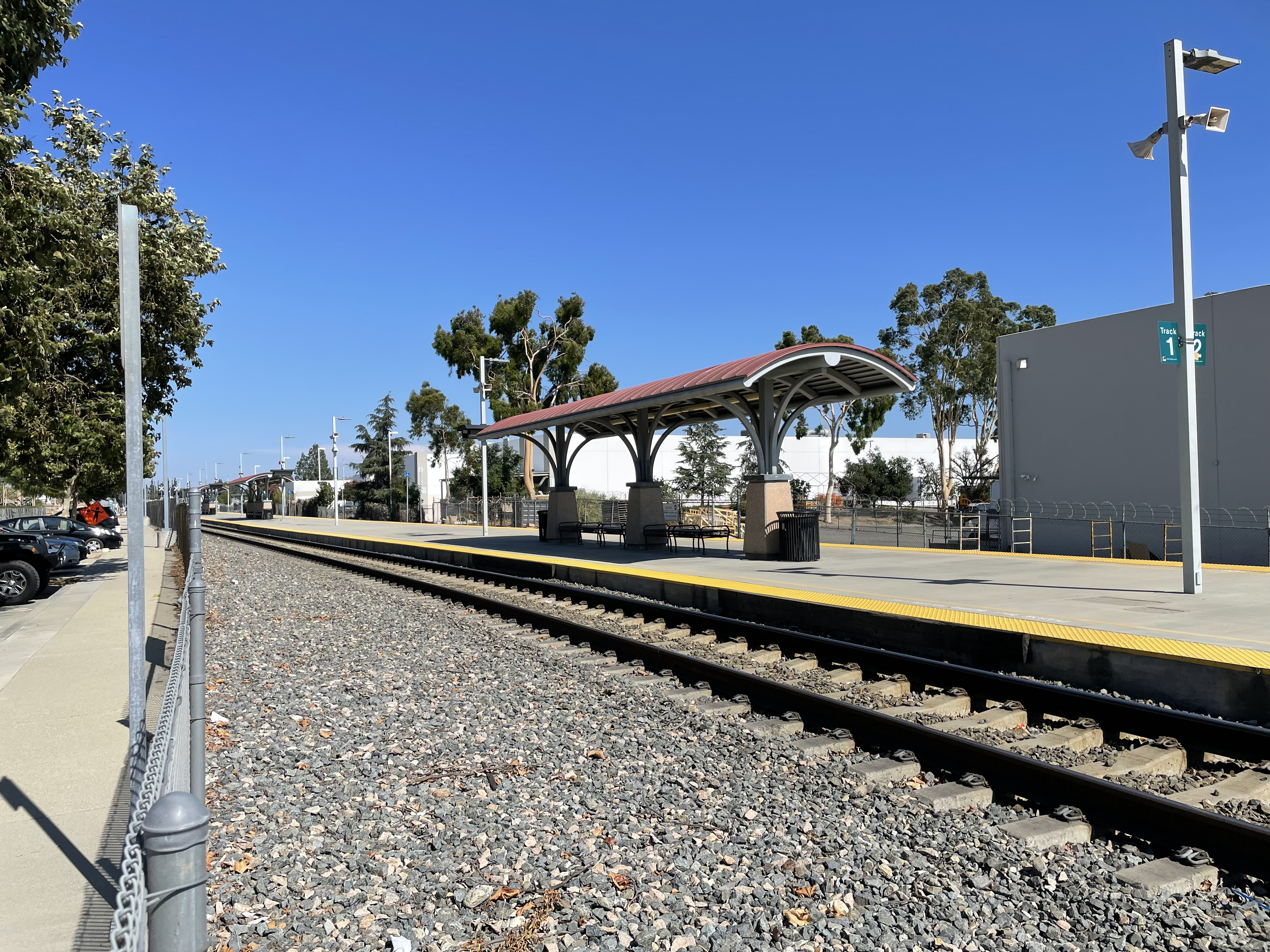
- Pomona–North station Metrolink platform

General information
- Location: 205 Santa Fe Street; Pomona, California; United States
- Coordinates: 34.0936°N 117.7533°W
- Owner: City of Pomona
- Line: SCRRA San Gabriel Subdivision
- Platforms: 2 island platforms
- Tracks: 2 commuter rail, 2 light rail
- Connections: Foothill Transit: 197, 291, 492; Cal Poly Pomona Bronco Express

Construction
- Parking: 530 spaces
- Accessible: Yes

History
- Opened: October 26, 1992 (Metrolink); September 19, 2025 (Metro)

Passengers
- FY 2026: 278 weekday boardings (Metrolink)
- FY 2026: 1,847 weekday boardings (Metro)

Services
Preceding station	Metrolink	Following station
Covina toward L.A. Union Station	San Bernardino Line	Claremont toward San Bernardino or Redlands
Fairplex (fair days) toward L.A. Union Station	San Bernardino Line	Claremont toward San Bernardino or Redlands
Preceding station	Metro Rail	Following station
La Verne/Fairplex toward Long Beach	A Line	Terminus
Former services (at AT&SF station)
Preceding station	Amtrak	Following station
Pasadena toward Los Angeles	Desert Wind 1979–1986	San Bernardino toward Chicago
Pasadena toward Los Angeles	Southwest Chief 1984–1994	San Bernardino toward Chicago
Pasadena toward Los Angeles	Southwest Limited 1974–1984	San Bernardino toward Chicago
Pasadena toward Los Angeles	Super Chief 1971–1974	San Bernardino toward Chicago
Pasadena toward Los Angeles	Las Vegas Limited 1976	San Bernardino toward Las Vegas
Preceding station	Atchison, Topeka and Santa Fe Railway	Following station
La Verne toward Los Angeles	Main Line Via Pasadena, Pomona	Claremont toward Chicago
Preceding station	Pacific Electric	Following station
at Fulton Road
La Verne toward Pacific Electric Building	Upland–San Bernardino	North Pomona toward San Bernardino
La Verne toward Pacific Electric Building	Riverside–Rialto	North Pomona toward Riverside
Location

Pomona–North station is a commuter rail and light rail station located in the North Pomona area of Pomona, California. It is located just west of Garey Avenue and south of Bonita Avenue. Formerly an inter-city rail station, it is served by Metrolink's San Bernardino Line and the Los Angeles Metro Rail's A Line.

== Location ==
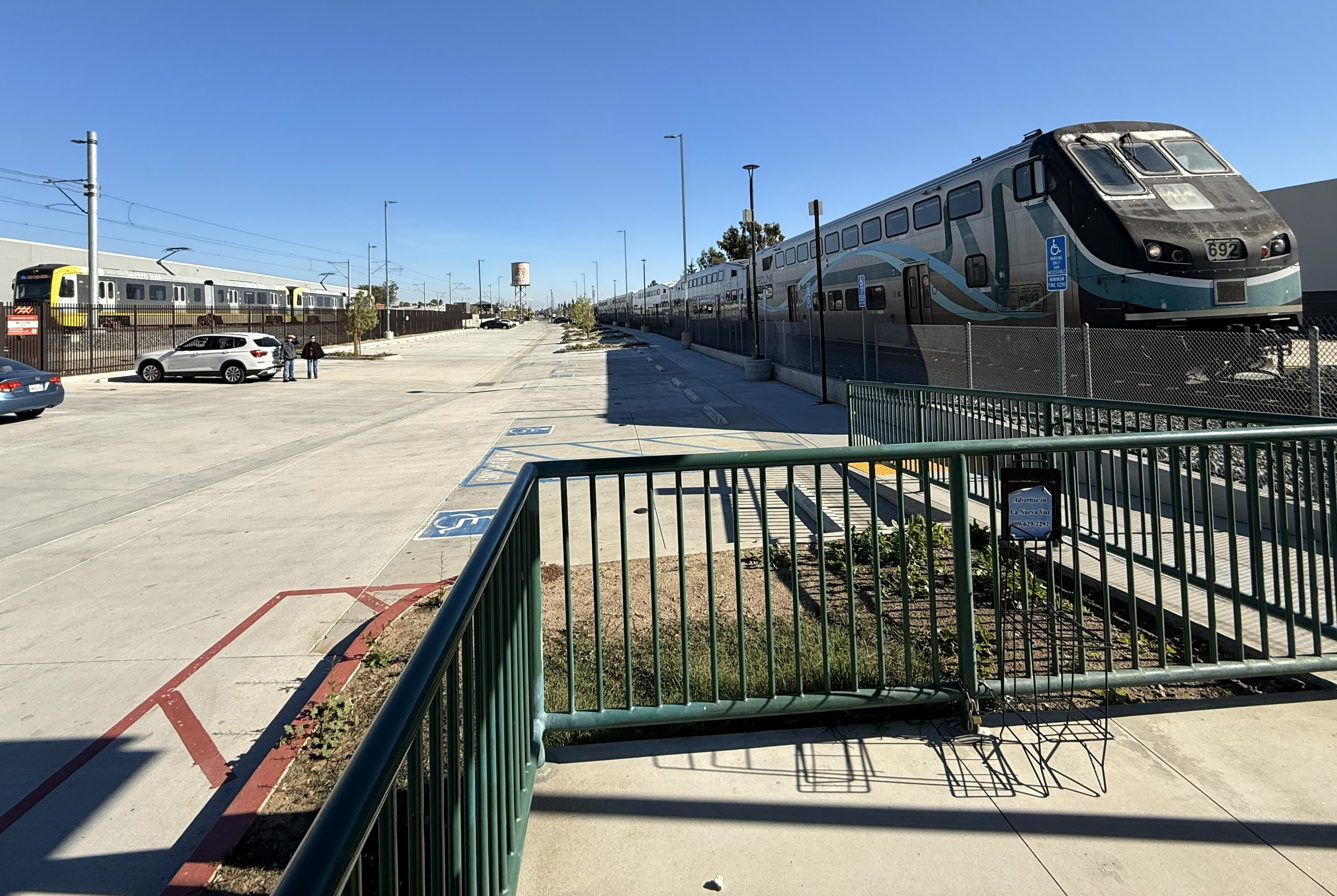
Metrolink and Metro Rail trains across the parking lot in December 2025

Pomona–North station is owned by the city of Pomona. A freight line, the Pasadena Subdivision originally built by the Atchison, Topeka and Santa Fe Railway (AT&SF), runs along the north side of the station. The old AT&SF station lies to the east of the station, on the northwest corner of Santa Fe and Garey Avenue. It is currently used for Metrolink right-of-way operations.

Pomona–North station serves Metrolink's San Bernardino Line and Los Angeles Metro Rail's A Line crossing the northern part of the city. A separate station called Pomona–Downtown station is located Downtown a few miles/kilometers to the south and also near Garey Avenue; it is an Amtrak station that also serves Metrolink trains on the Riverside Line.

The Pomona-North A Line Station has an island platform and TAP to exit validators with gates.

Metrolink's operations center is located near the station.

== Service ==
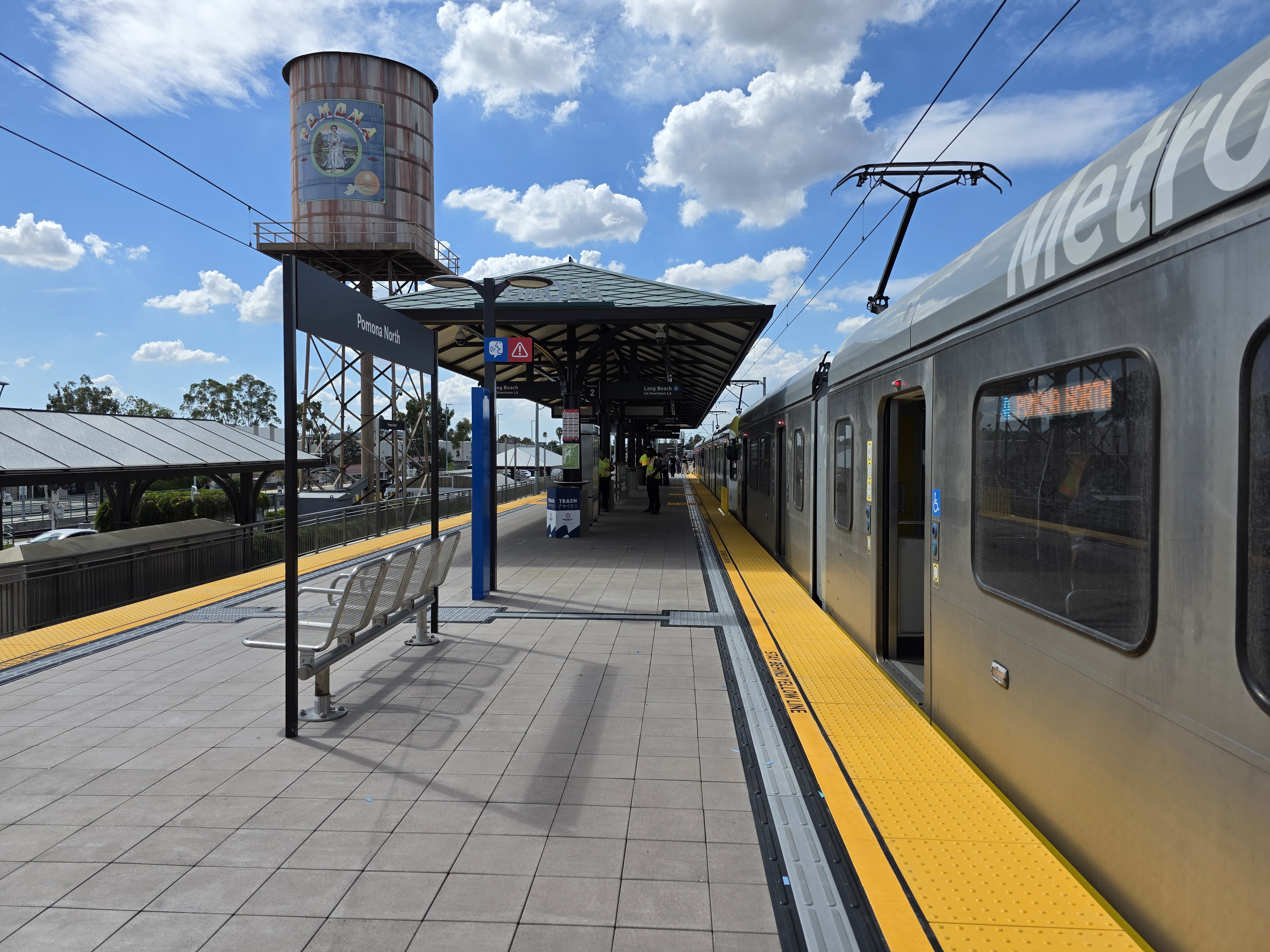
A Line station platform on opening day, September 19, 2025

=== Hours and frequency ===
The Pomona–North station is served by 32 Metrolink San Bernardino Line trains (16 in each direction) on weekdays, between 4:36 a.m. and 10:39 p.m. Weekend train service is less: 16 trains (8 in each direction) on Saturdays and Sundays between 7:26 a.m. and 10:30 p.m.

A Line service hours are from approximately 4:30 a.m. and 11:45 p.m. daily. Trains operate every 8 minutes during peak hours, Monday to Friday. Trains run every 10 minutes, during midday on weekdays and weekends, from 9:00 a.m. to 7:00 p.m. Night and early morning service is approximately every 20 minutes every day.

=== Connections ===
The following connections are available:

- Foothill Transit: 197, 291, 492
- Cal Poly Pomona Bronco Express

== History ==
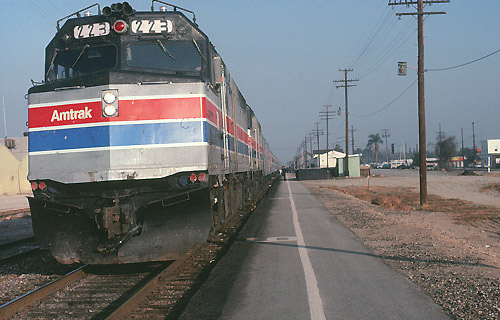
Southwest Limited at Pomona station, November 11, 1979

This site was the home to the Los Angeles and San Gabriel Valley Railroad station opened in 1887. At the time, there was debate as to call the station North Pomona, Palomares, or Palermo.

AT&SF operated intercity trains from Pomona, including the Super Chief and Chief. Between 1914 and 1941, Pacific Electric interurban trains on the Upland–San Bernardino Line stopped at Fulton Road. When Amtrak took over intercity train operations in 1971, Pomona was maintained as a stop on the Super Chief. Metrolink service to Pomona began on October 26, 1992 as an inaugural station of the commuter rail system. Intercity service ceased after January 20, 1994 when the Southwest Chief was rerouted via the San Bernardino Subdivision.

During planning, the A Line platform was simply known as "Pomona", with Metro adopting the current name in March 2019 to harmonize it with the San Bernardino Line platform.

As the fourth station on the Foothill Extension Phase 2B to Pomona project, the A Line platform was officially dedicated with a ceremony on June 20, 2025, featuring regional politicians and a celebration for the general public. It opened on September 19, 2025. As part of the A Line extension, an additional 300 spaces were added to a lot, south of the Metrolink tracks, where Line 291 buses pull in to drop off passengers bound for the station. A parking charge of $3 was imposed on weekdays commensurate with the opening.
