= San Pedro Street =

Street in Los Angeles County, California

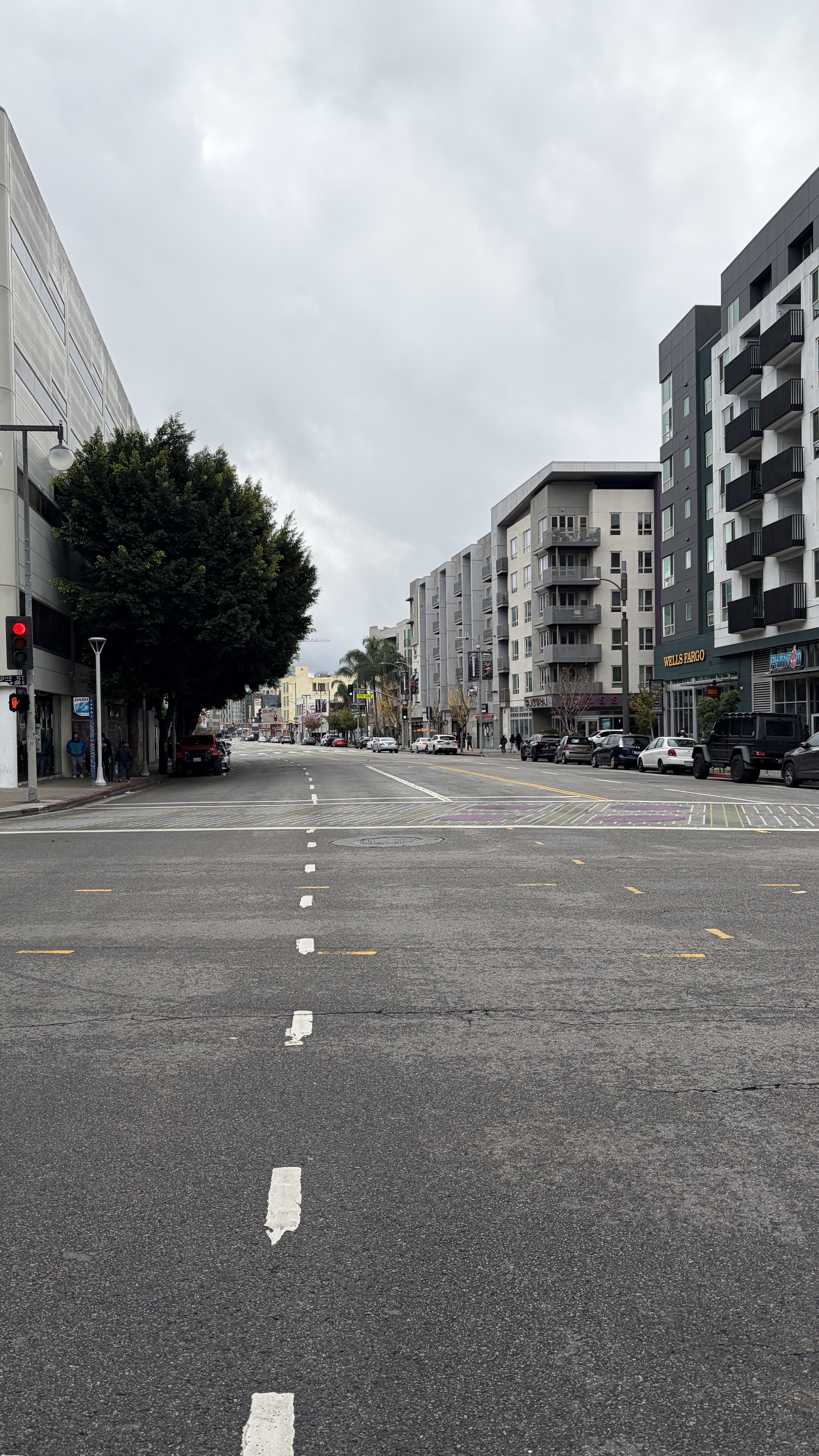
- San Pedro Street (2026)
- Interactive map of San Pedro Street
- Nearest metro station: San Pedro Street
- South end: Avalon Boulevard in West Rancho Dominguez
- North end: 1st Street in Los Angeles

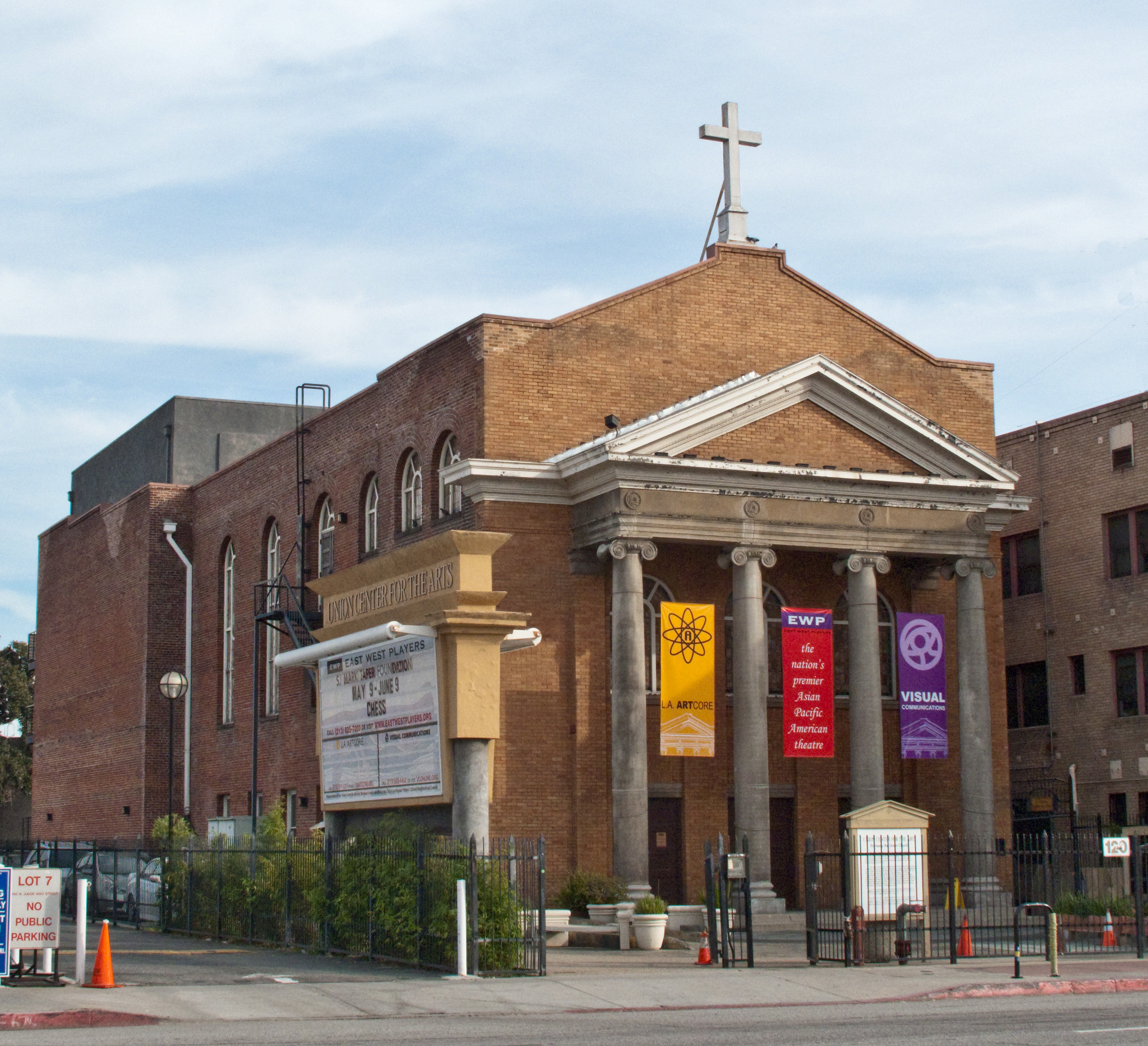
The Union Center for the Arts (former Japanese Union Church) on Judge John Aiso Street

San Pedro Street is a major north–south thoroughfare in Los Angeles County, California, running from Little Tokyo in Downtown Los Angeles through South Los Angeles before terminating in the unincorporated area of West Rancho Dominguez.

San Pedro Street was one of the earliest roadways, along with Alameda Street, between central Los Angeles and the Port of Los Angeles; much of the road's original alignment south of Jefferson Boulevard has been renamed Avalon Boulevard.

The portion of San Pedro Street north of 1st Street was renamed Judge John Aiso Street in 1999.

== Landmarks ==
- Edward R. Roybal Federal Building and United States Courthouse
- Union Center for the Arts (former Japanese Union Church of Los Angeles)
- San Pedro Firm Building
- Little Tokyo
- Japanese American Cultural & Community Center
- The Japanese American Veterans Memorial Court
- James Irvine Japanese Garden
- Toy District
- Skid Row
- Fashion District

== Public transportation ==
Metro Local lines 48 and 51 serve San Pedro Street; Line 48 runs in South LA and line 51 in Downtown LA.

The Metro A Line serves a light rail station in the center median of Washington Boulevard about half a block east of that street.
