= Washington Boulevard (Los Angeles) =

Road in Los Angeles

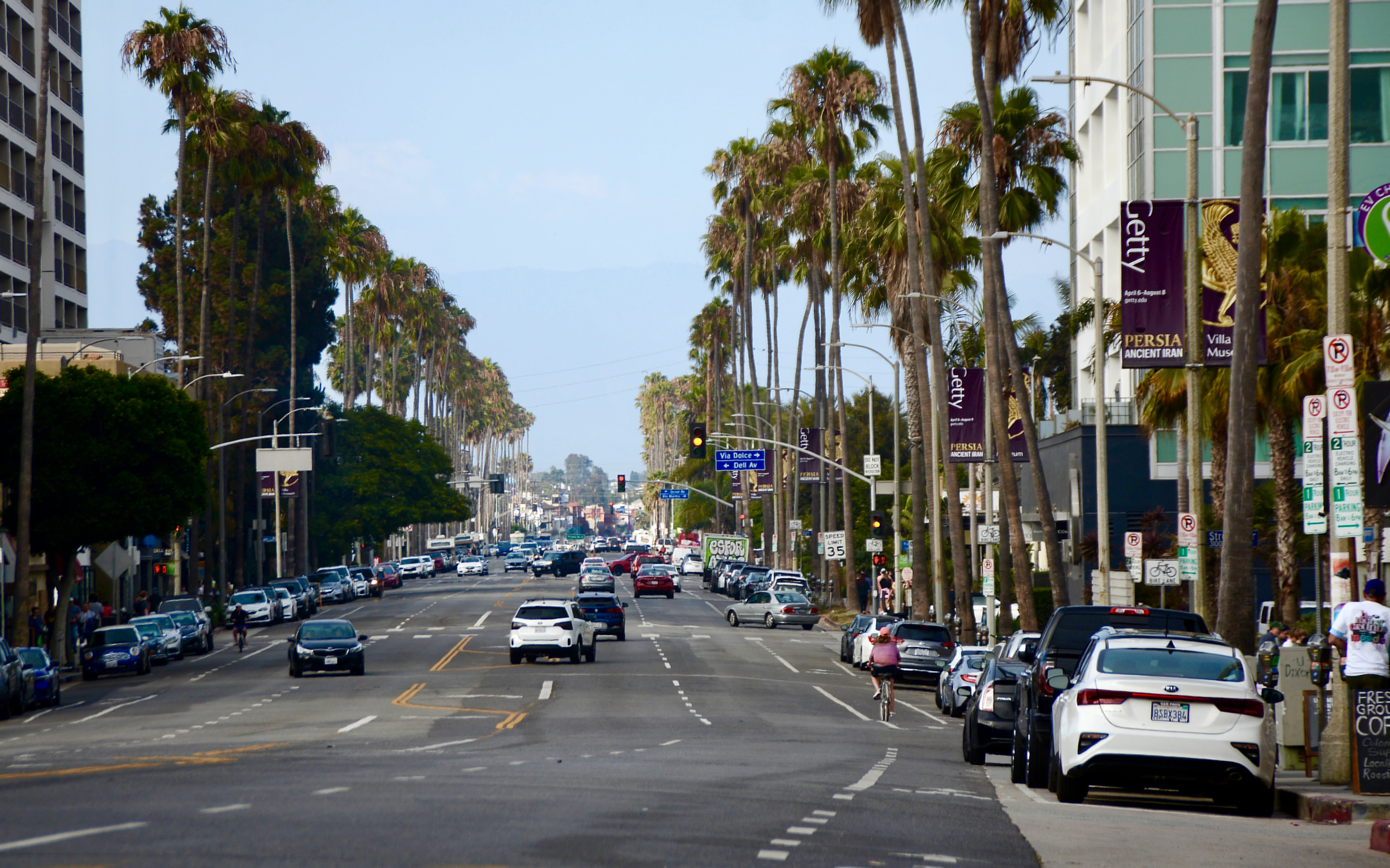
- Interactive map of Washington Boulevard
- Namesake: George Washington
- Maintained by: Local jurisdictions
- Location: Los Angeles County, California, United States
- Nearest metro station: : Culver City; Grand/LATTC; San Pedro St; Washington
- West end: Pacific Avenue in Los Angeles
- Major junctions: SR 1 in Los Angeles; I-10 in Los Angeles; I-710 in Commerce; I-5 in Commerce; I-605 in West Whittier-Los Nietos
- East end: Whittier Boulevard in Whittier

Washington Boulevard is an east-west arterial road in Los Angeles County, California, spanning a total of 27.4 miles (44 km).

Its western terminus is the Pacific Ocean just west of Pacific Avenue and straddling the border of the Venice Beach and Marina Peninsula neighborhoods of Los Angeles. The boulevard extends eastbound to the city of Whittier, at Whittier Boulevard. It runs south of Venice Boulevard for most of its length. At Wade Street, Washington Place is formed adjacent and parallel and lasts until just east of Sepulveda Boulevard, where it merges back into Washington Boulevard. Washington merges into Culver Boulevard briefly, but forms back into its own street at Canfield Avenue.

Washington Boulevard, which is primarily four lanes but has some six-lane sections, passes through locations in the mid-southern portion of Los Angeles County. The communities to the west include affluent areas such as Marina del Rey and Ladera Heights. Further east it passes between Crestview and Culver City and through Mid City, Arlington Heights, Pico Union, City of Commerce, Montebello, Pico Rivera, Los Nietos and Whittier.

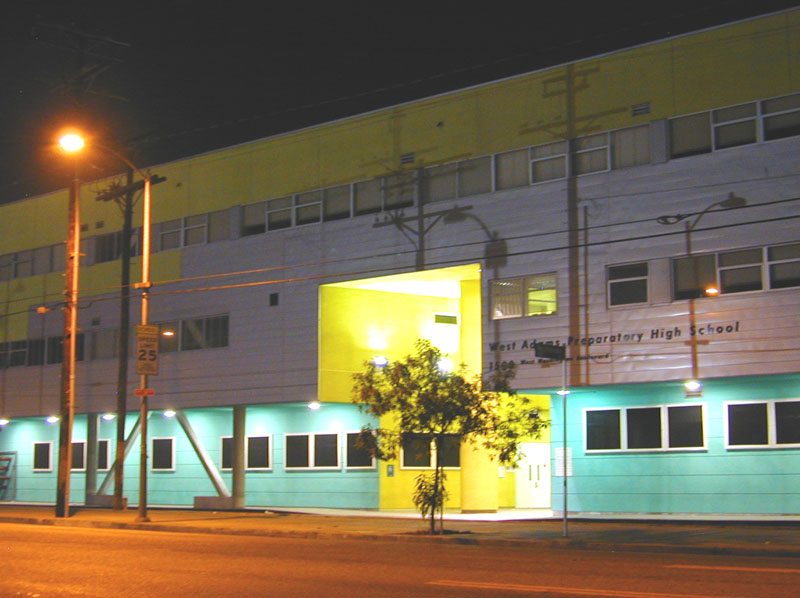
West Adams Preparatory High School is located on Vermont Avenue and Washington Blvd.

== History ==
In early days the western portion of Washington was known as the Ballona Road. The far eastern end was known as the Los Angeles and Anaheim Telegraph Road.

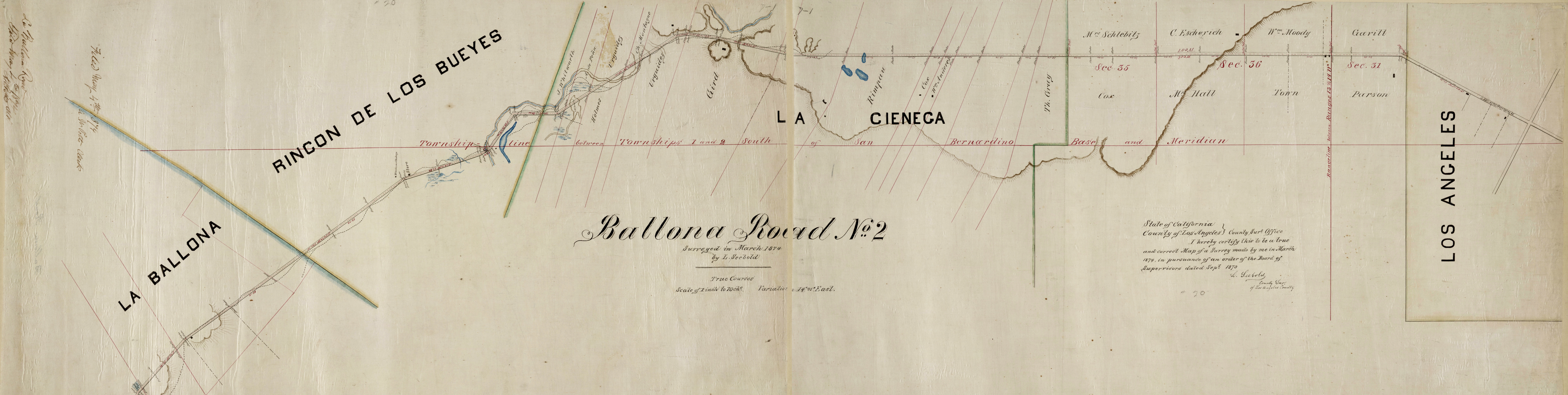
Ballona Road - 1874 - Washington Boulevard from roughly Elenda Street to Hoover Street

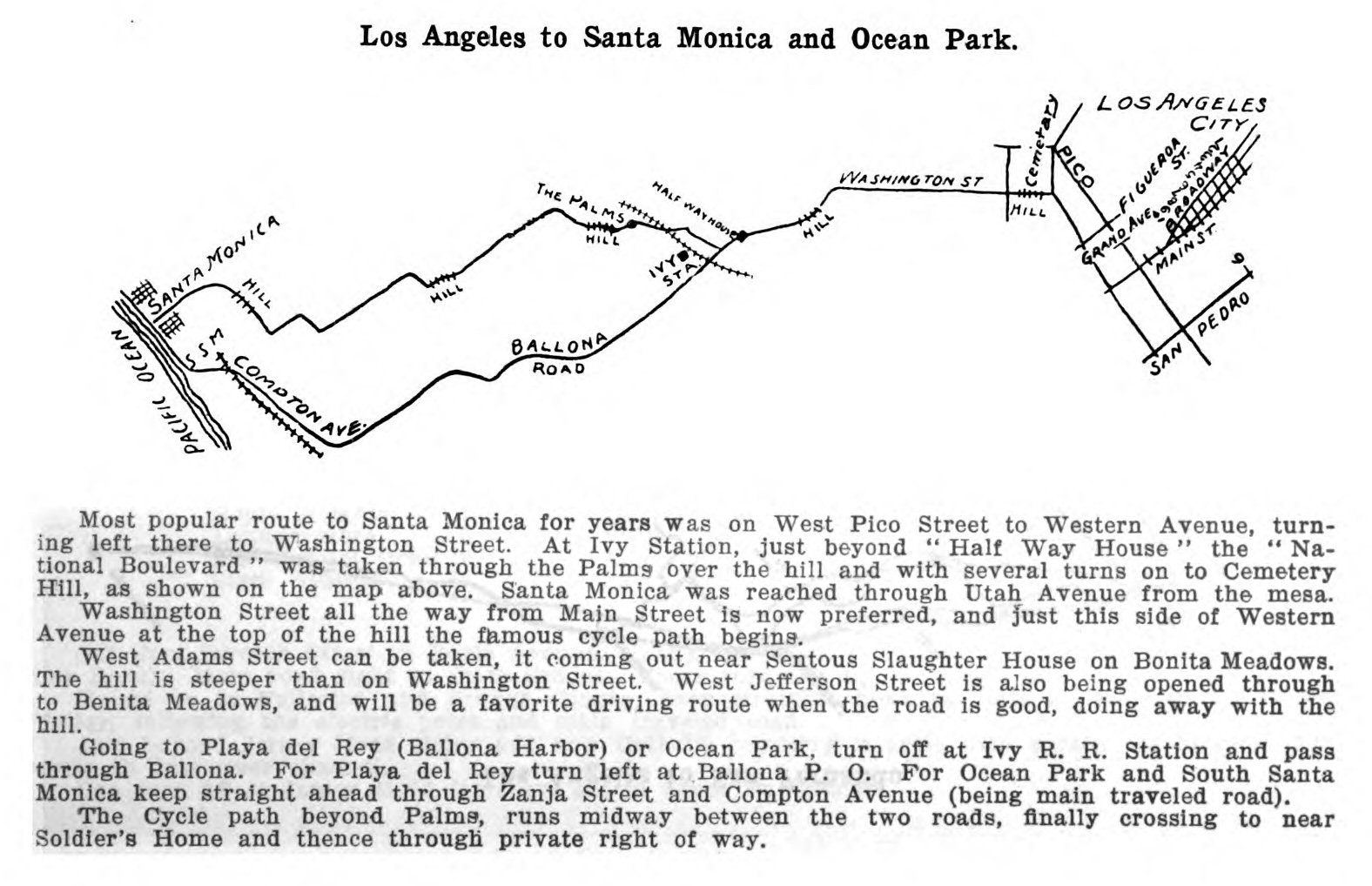
Ballona Road and Ivy Station c. 1903

In 1905, it boasted the headquarters of the local horse driving club, for a mile west of Western Avenue. "The road is not of the best," reported the Los Angeles Times, "and automobiles are usurping it . . . but it is the nearest approach to a speedway the reinsmen have, and they therefore make the most of it." Mayor Owen McAleer "has set aside that stretch of the highway to those drivers who delight in vying with each other off the racetrack, and policemen have been given to understand that some latitude is to be allowed horsemen there."

== Transportation ==
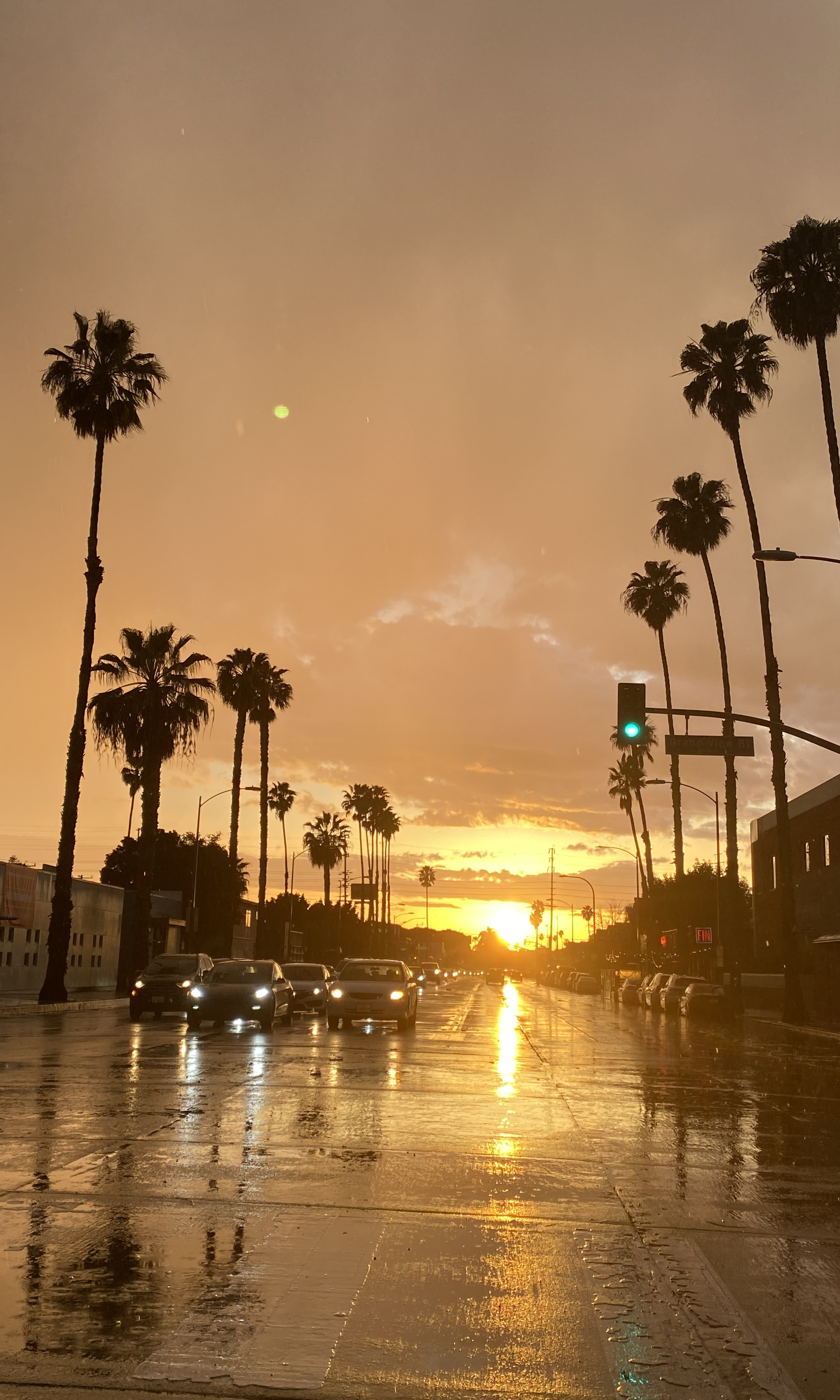
Washington Boulevard, westbound in Culver City

Washington Boulevard provides bus service between Venice Beach and West LA Transit Center by Culver City Transit line 1, between West LA Transit Center and Downtown by Metro Local line 35, and east of Downtown by Montebello Transit line 50. A portion of the Metro A Line runs along Washington Boulevard (serving the Grand/LATTC, San Pedro and Washington stations), from Flower Street to Long Beach Avenue, while the Metro E Line serves a rail station near the intersection with National Boulevard.

== Major intersections ==
The entire route is in Los Angeles County.

Location	mi	km	Destinations	Notes
Los Angeles	0	0.0	Pacific Avenue	Western terminus of Washington Boulevard
Los Angeles	1.3	2.1	SR 1 (Lincoln Boulevard, Pacific Coast Highway) – Santa Monica, Long Beach	
Culver City	3.7	6.0	Sepulveda Boulevard	
Culver City	5.1	8.2	Culver Boulevard	Overlap with Culver Boulevard for 0.25 miles (0.40 km)
Culver City	6.5	10.5	La Cienega Boulevard	
Los Angeles	6.8	10.9	Fairfax Avenue	
Los Angeles	6.9	11.1	I-10 (Santa Monica Freeway) – Santa Monica, San Bernardino	
Los Angeles	8.5	13.7	La Brea Avenue	
Los Angeles	9.5	15.3	Crenshaw Boulevard	
Los Angeles	10.2	16.4	Arlington Avenue	
Los Angeles	10.7	17.2	Western Avenue	
Los Angeles	11.2	18.0	Normandie Avenue	
Los Angeles	11.7	18.8	Vermont Avenue	
Los Angeles	12.9	20.8	Figueroa Street	
Los Angeles	13.4	21.6	Main Street	
Los Angeles	13.9	22.4	San Pedro Street	
Los Angeles	14.4	23.2	Central Avenue	
Los Angeles	15.1	24.3	Alameda Street	
Los Angeles	15.6	25.1	Santa Fe Avenue	
Los Angeles	16.3	26.2	Soto Street	
Commerce	19.2	30.9	I-710 (Long Beach Freeway) / Valley Boulevard – Long Beach	
Commerce	19.5	31.4	Atlantic Boulevard/Avenue	
Commerce	20.0	32.2	Eastern Avenue	
Commerce	20.9	33.6	I-5 (Santa Ana Freeway) – Los Angeles, Santa Ana	Northbound entrance and exit via Telegraph Road
Commerce	21.0	33.8	Telegraph Road	
Commerce	21.7	34.9	Garfield Avenue	
Montebello	22.6	36.4	Greenwood Avenue	
Pico Rivera	23.6	38.0	Paramount Boulevard	
Pico Rivera	24.2	38.9	SR 19 (Rosemead Boulevard) – Long Beach, Pasadena	
West Whittier	25.3	40.7	I-605 (San Gabriel River Freeway)	Northbound entrance and exit via Pioneer Boulevard
West Whittier	25.4	40.9	Pioneer Boulevard	
West Whittier–Santa Fe Springs line	25.7	41.4	Norwalk Boulevard	
Whittier	27.2	43.8	Lambert Road	Western terminus of Lambert Road; to Chino Hills, California
Whittier	27.6	44.4	SR 72 (Whittier Boulevard) / Pickering Avenue / Santa Fe Springs Road – La Habra, Pico Rivera	Eastern terminus of Washington Boulevard
1.000 mi = 1.609 km; 1.000 km = 0.621 mi

== Notable landmarks ==
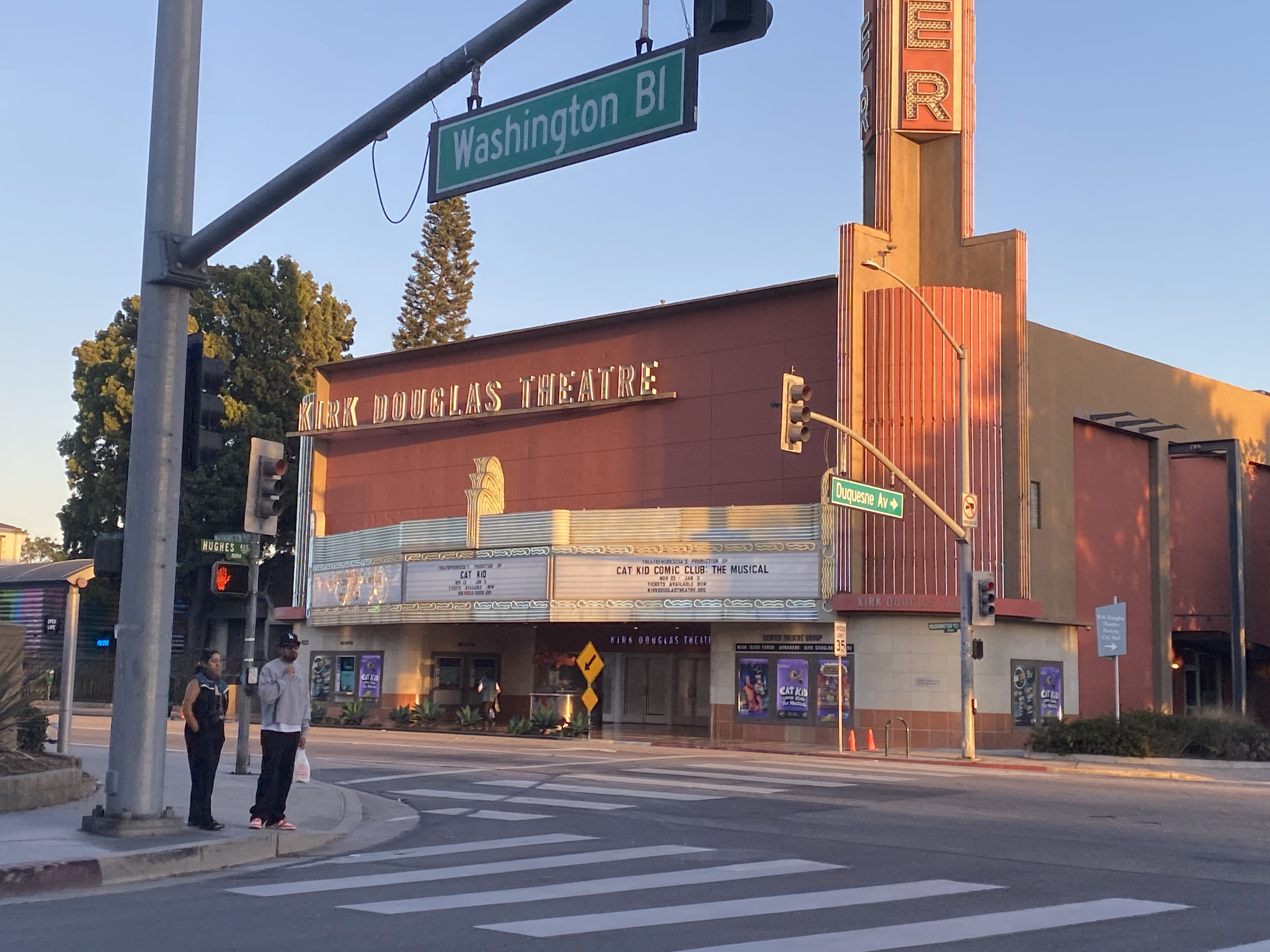
Kirk Douglas Theatre, Washington Blvd.

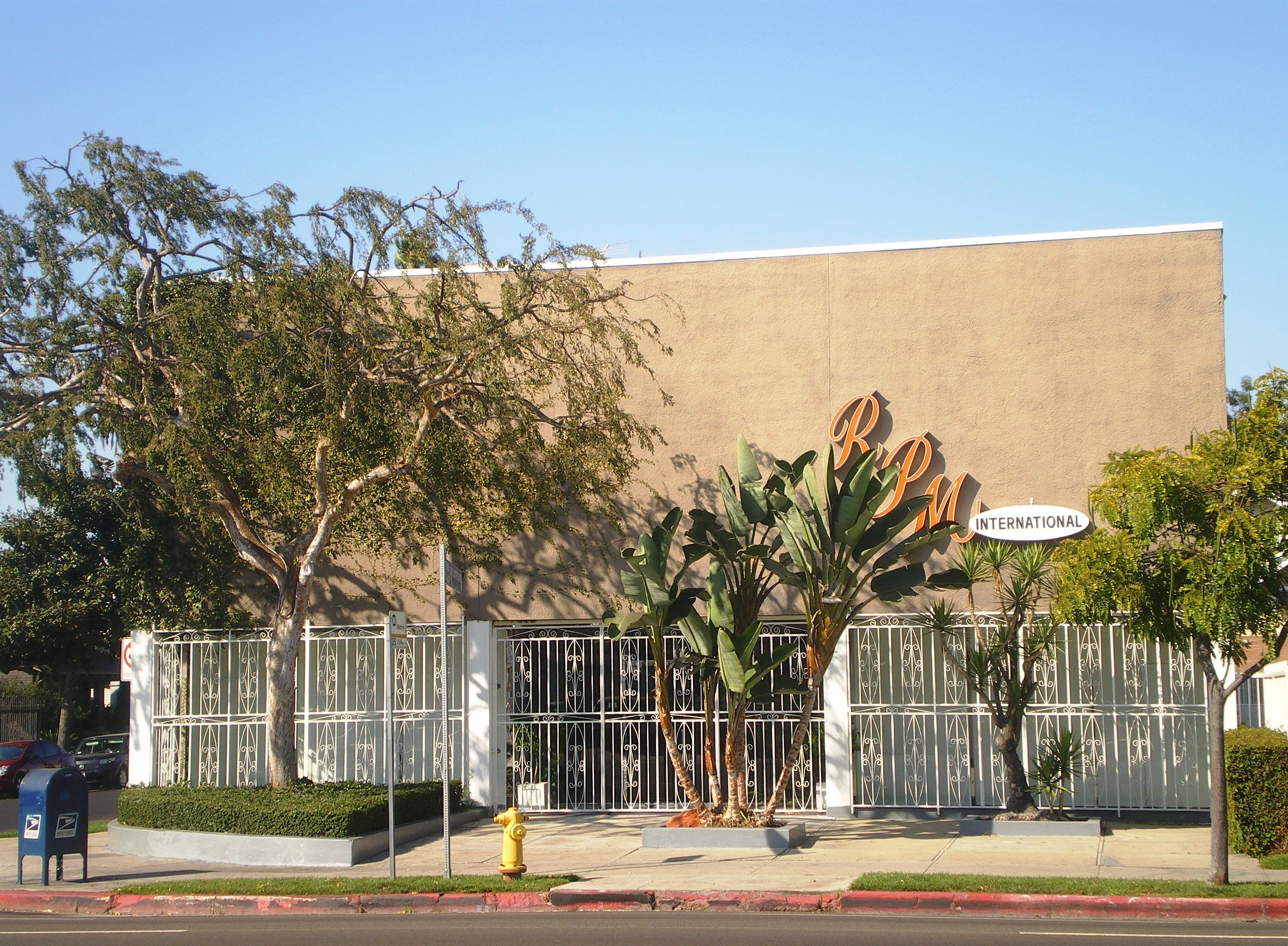
Ray Charles Square, Los Angeles

- Angelus-Rosedale Cemetery
- LA Trade Tech College is located at Grand Avenue near the A Line station of the same name.
- The RPM International building (Ray Charles Enterprises) is located on the corner of Westmorland Blvd. and Washington Blvd., which is also dedicated as the "Ray Charles Square".
- The Ray Charles Post Office at La Brea Avenue.
- Government center named after David S. Cunningham, Jr., City Council member, 1973–87
- West Adams Preparatory High School is located on Vermont Avenue and Washington Blvd.
