= Alameda Street =

Road in Los Angeles County, California

Coordinates: 34°2′50″N 118°14′17″W

- Interactive map of Alameda Street
- Part of: SR 47 between Henry Ford Avenue near Wilmington and SR 91 near Compton
- Length: 21 miles
- Nearest metro station: : Little Tokyo/Arts District; Union Station; Chinatown
- South end: SR 47 near Wilmington
- Major junctions: SR 1 near Wilmington; I-405 near Carson; SR 91 near Compton; I-105 near Watts/Lynwood; I-10 in Los Angeles; US 101 near Downtown LA
- North end: College Street near Chinatown, Los Angeles

Alameda Street is a major north-south thoroughfare in Los Angeles County, California. It is approximately 21 miles in length, running from Harry Bridges Boulevard in Wilmington; and through Carson, Compton, Lynwood, Watts, Florence-Graham, Huntington Park, Vernon and Arts District to Spring and College in Chinatown. For much of its length, Alameda runs through present and former industrial corridors, and is paralleled by Union Pacific Railroad (formerly Southern Pacific Railroad) tracks.

== Route description ==
=== Downtown and Chinatown ===
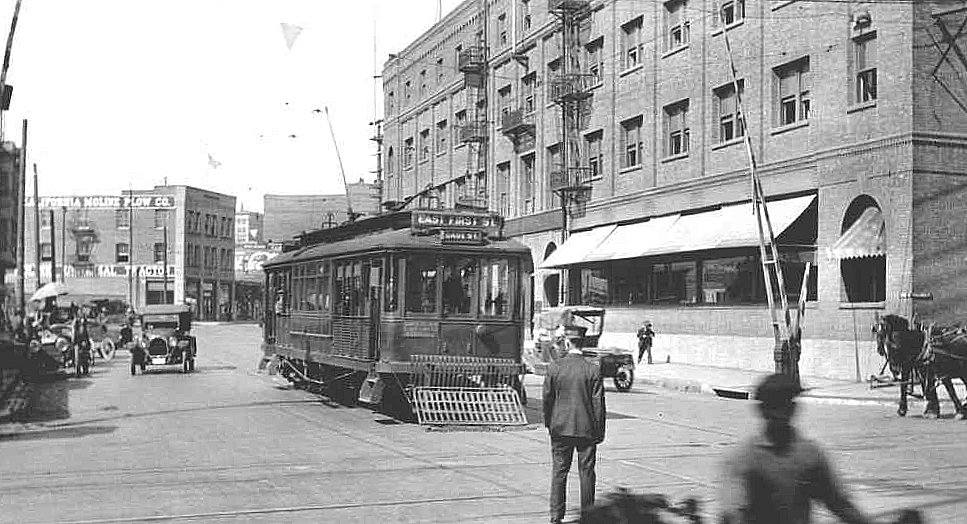
Alameda Street at 1st Street, 1918

Alameda Street runs on the east side of the Old Plaza, Los Angeles, and once also ran along the westside of Old Chinatown. In the late 19th century, Alameda Street and Commercial Street were Los Angeles' original red-light district. South of Union Station, Alameda Street enters Little Tokyo and the former Warehouse District, now the Arts District. At one time, a lot on Alameda and 8th was a haven for free-speech demonstrations.

=== South of Downtown ===
At 27th Street, Alameda Street splits into two roadways divided by the 10-mile (16 km) Mid-Corridor Trench: a local roadway on the east and the main Alameda Street to the west. Here, Alameda Street intersects with Slauson Avenue, Florence Avenue, Firestone Boulevard (former SR 42) and Imperial Highway. Each of these streets is grade-separated from the rail line. Though Alameda Street has interchanges with I-10, SR 91 and I-405, it does not have an interchange with I-105 near Watts.

=== California State Route 47 ===
Alameda Street is designated California State Route 47 between the California State Route 91 and Henry Ford Avenue. There are few at-grade crossings with other streets in this portion of Alameda, with Artesia Boulevard, Del Amo Boulevard, Carson Street, 223rd Street (at the San Diego Freeway/I-405 interchange) Sepulveda Boulevard, and Pacific Coast Highway (SR 1), all flying over Alameda while being connected to it with connector ramps. Alameda Street descends into a tunnel between California State 91 and Del Amo Boulevard, at which point the Alameda Corridor crosses from the east to the west of Alameda.

South of Henry Ford Avenue, Alameda Street continues for another 1.4 miles (2.3 km) in Wilmington before ending at Harry Bridges Boulevard (formerly B Street).

=== Southern Pacific Railroad ===
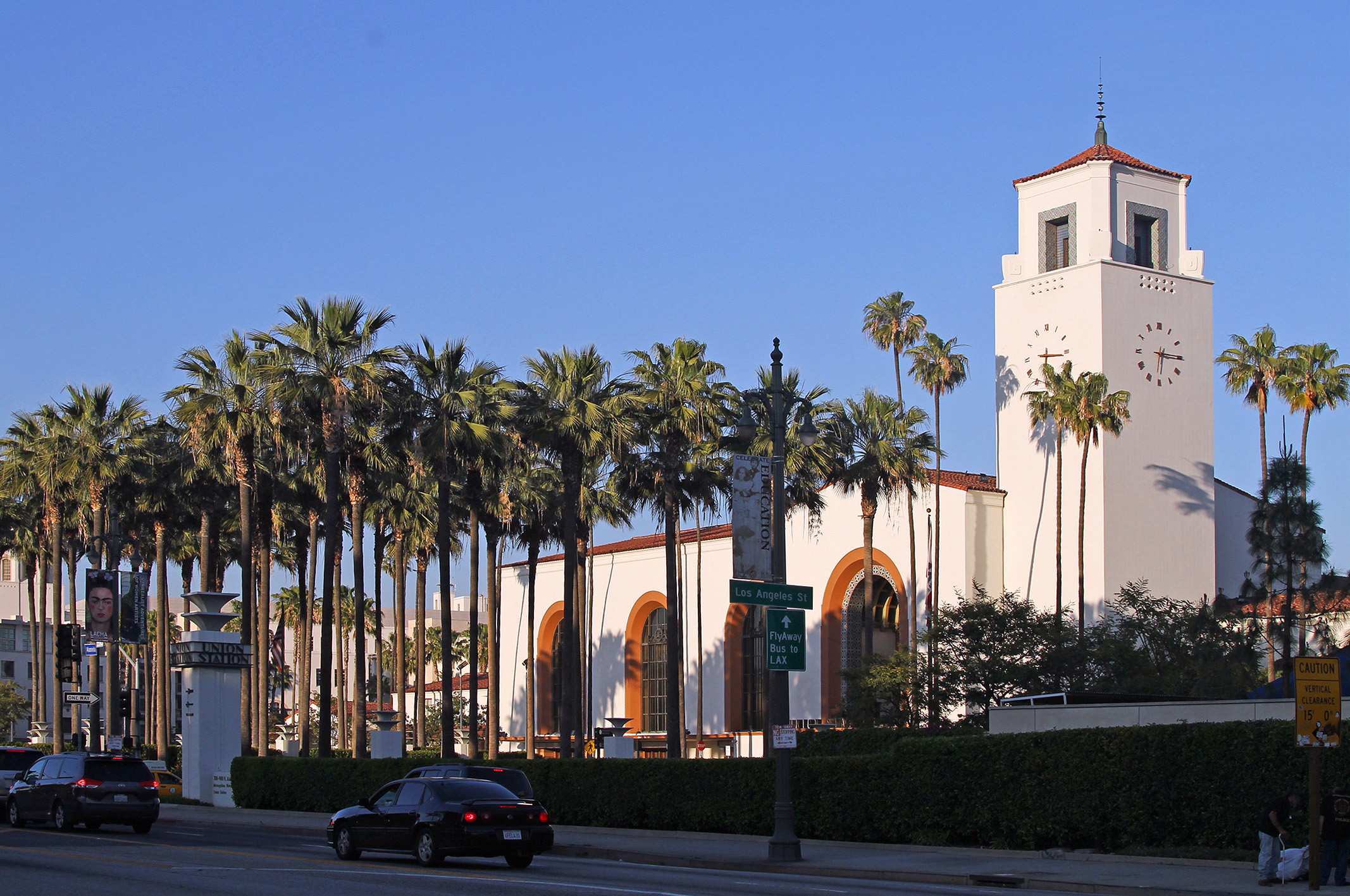
Alameda Street at Union Station, 2012

Alameda Street has a long history of Southern Pacific Railroad tracks running on or parallel to it. Before the building of Union Station, Southern Pacific trains would travel along Alameda between Naud Junction and the Southern Pacific Arcade Station on 5th Street. Though Southern Pacific eventually rerouted its downtown tracks to the LA River, Alameda still carries SP tracks between 27th Street and the Port of Los Angeles. This area is known as the Alameda Corridor. With the 2002 completion of the Alameda Corridor in a trench adjacent to Alameda, the trackage is now shared by the BNSF Railway and Union Pacific Railroad (Southern Pacific's company). Los Angeles Union Station fronts onto Alameda Street.

== History ==
The street is located on Tongva land. In the 1820s, historian William David Estrada records that immigrants from France came to Los Angeles in small numbers and settled around the Commercial and Alameda streets, close to the original village site of Yaanga.

The street became a center of prostitution activity in Los Angeles by the late 19th century, after the city council passed an ordinance prohibiting prostitution from the new central business district. Prostitution reportedly peaked in the 1890s, "with the support of local police and elected officials, many of whom were regular visitors" to the brothels. Those on North Alameda Street, adjacent to the Southern Pacific Railroad tracks, were the most active and became "the first view of Los Angeles for arriving train passengers."

In the late 19th century, the corner of Alameda Street and Macy Street (now Cesar Chavez Avenue) was home to residences shared by Mexican and Chinese families. Along Alameda and Los Angeles Streets to Second Street was primarily a Japanese community, shared with Mexicans, and the last remnants of the French community.

== Transit ==
Metro Local Line 202 runs along Alameda Street between Del Amo Boulevard and Pacific Coast Highway. Metro Local Line 58 formerly served Alameda Street between Union Station and Washington, but was discontinued in 2005.

Three Metro A Line Stations are located on Alameda Street: Little Tokyo/Arts District, Union Station, and Chinatown, with the former-most also served by the Metro E Line. Union Station is also served by the B and D lines, as well as Metrolink and Amtrak.
