= Little Tokyo/Arts District station =

Light rail station in Los Angeles, California

Little Tokyo/Arts District
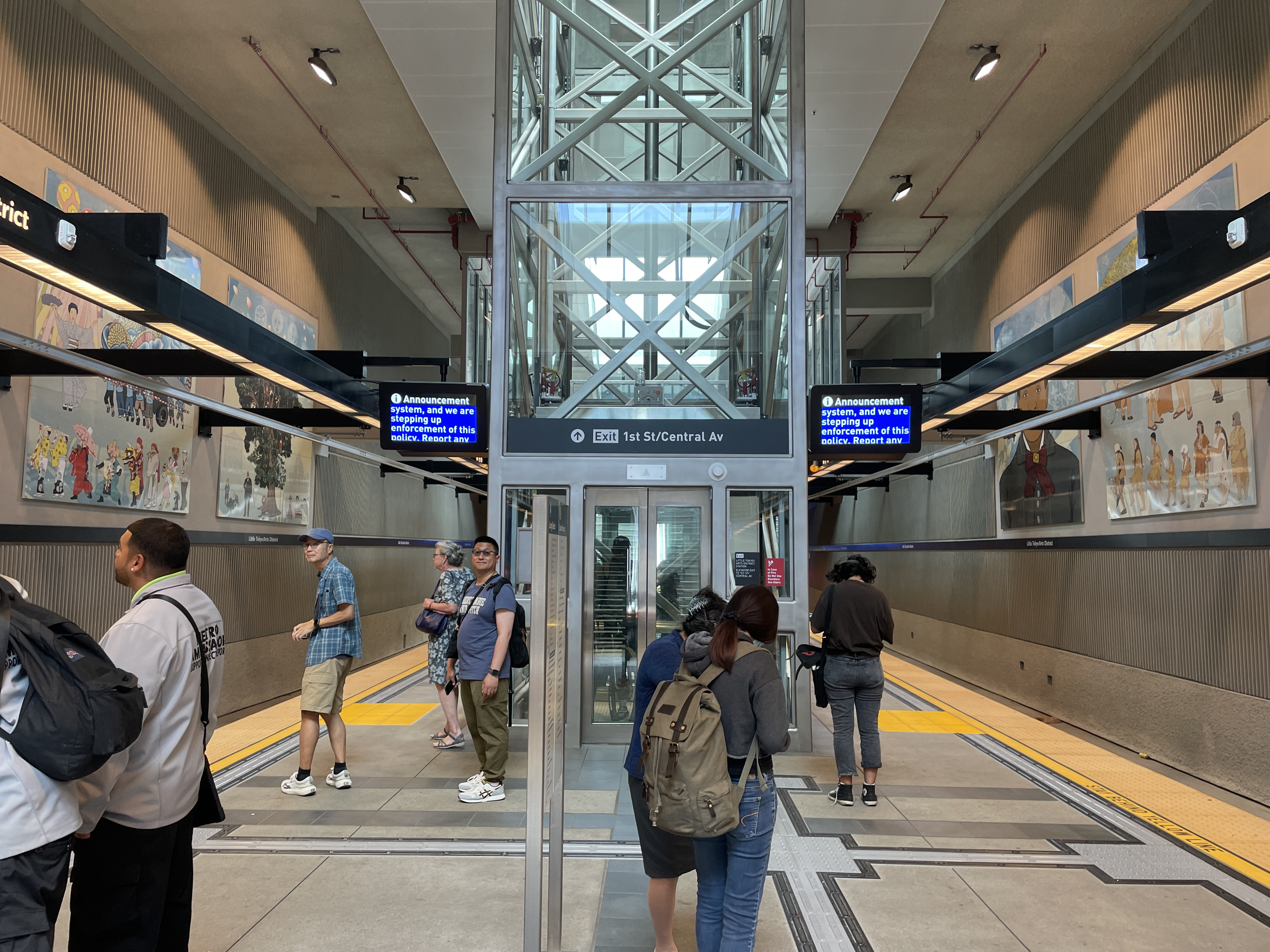
- Little Tokyo/Arts District station platform

General information
- Location: 402 East 1st Street; Los Angeles, California
- Coordinates: 34.0487°N 118.2387°W
- Owner: Los Angeles County Metropolitan Transportation Authority
- Platforms: 1 island platform
- Tracks: 2
- Connections: Los Angeles Metro Bus; LADOT DASH

Construction
- Structure type: Underground
- Parking: Paid parking nearby
- Cycle facilities: Metro Bike Share station, racks, lockers
- Accessible: Yes

History
- Opened: November 15, 2009 (at-grade station) June 16, 2023 (underground station)
- Closed: October 24, 2020 (at-grade station)
- Rebuilt: 2020–2023

Passengers
- FY 2026: 4,562 (avg. wkdy boardings)

Services
Preceding station	Metro Rail	Following station
Historic Broadway toward Long Beach	A Line	Union Station toward Pomona
Historic Broadway toward Santa Monica	E Line	Pico/Aliso toward East LA
Former services (at at-grade station)
Preceding station	Metro Rail	Following station
Pico/Aliso toward East Los Angeles	L Line	Union Station toward Azusa
Location

Little Tokyo/Arts District station is an underground light rail station on the Los Angeles Metro Rail system. It replaced an at-grade station with the same name that was located on the east side of Alameda Street between 1st Street and Temple Street, on the edge of Little Tokyo and the Arts District in Downtown Los Angeles. The at-grade station opened in 2009 as part of the Gold Line Eastside Extension and was served by the L Line. The at-grade station closed in October 2020, and the new underground station on the south side of 1st Street between Central Avenue and Alameda Street opened on June 16, 2023.

== History ==
=== Former services ===
The Little Tokyo/Arts District station was once a key area for trains in Downtown Los Angeles. James M. Davies, for whom the large tract was named, subdivided the area in 1891. Several railroad lines from different companies connected through this site. Davies great-nephew, Robert Davies Volk, was the owner of the lots at 1st and Alameda streets with brick buildings shaped to fit the long-gone rail lines. The structures had played an important role in the cultural life of the Little Tokyo neighborhood for decades before the site was cleared for the future station. Los Angeles Railway P Line yellow streetcars operated on the surface of 1st Street until 1963, including a call at Alameda.

=== At-grade station ===
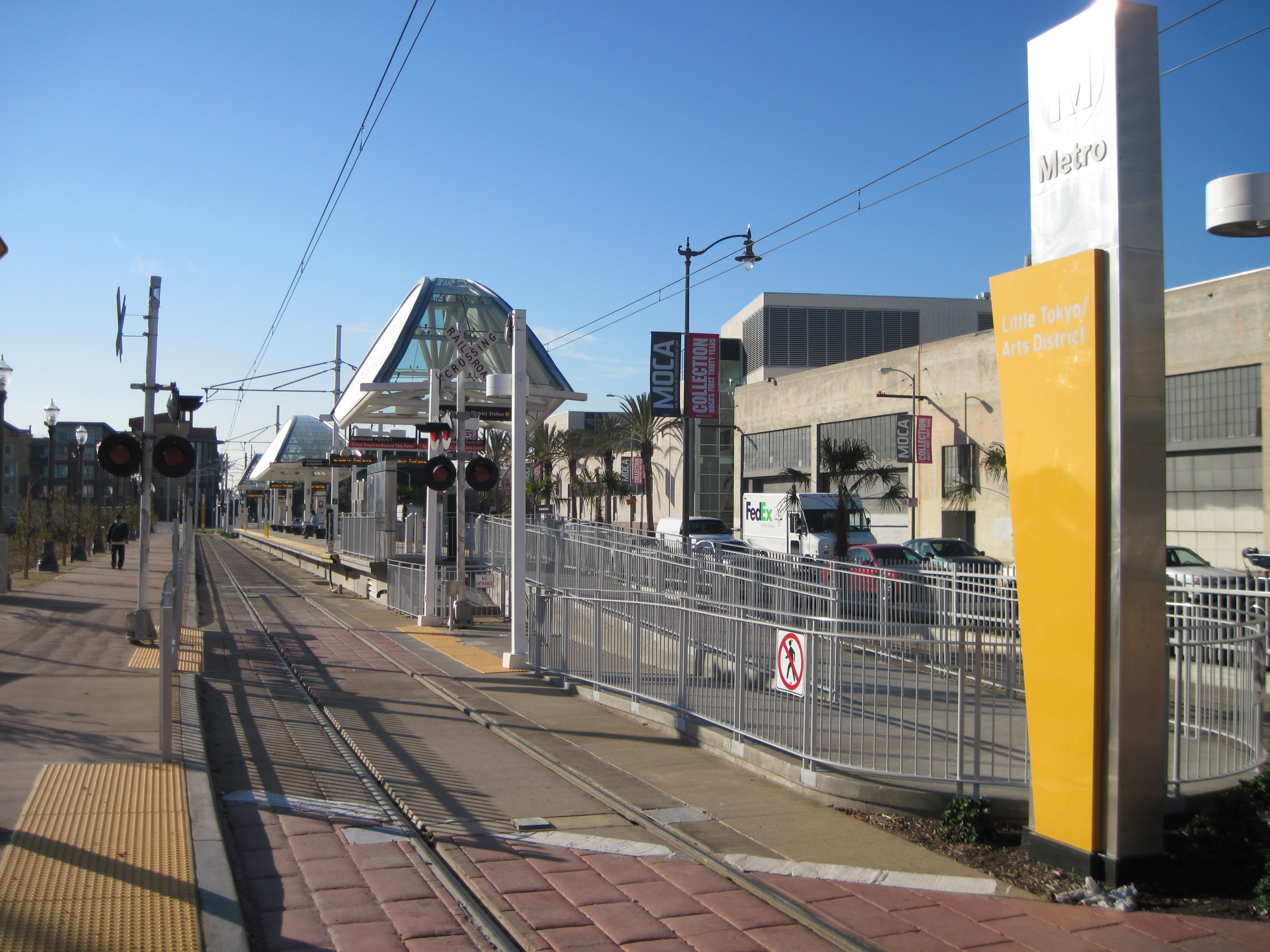
Little Tokyo/Arts District station's former at-grade platform, 2009

On July 17, 2004, Metro began construction on a 6 miles (9.7 km) extension of the Gold Line light rail line called the Gold Line Eastside Extension, which replaced a once-planned Red Line (now the B Line) subway extension. The light rail extension runs from Union Station through Little Tokyo, ending at the corner of Pomona and Atlantic Boulevards in East Los Angeles. One of the stations on the extension was the at-grade Little Tokyo/Arts District station, located east of Alameda Street between 1st and Temple Streets. The station began operations with the opening of the Eastside Extension on November 15, 2009. However, the at-grade station only operated for nearly eleven years.

In 2012, the Regional Connector Transit Project and its Environmental Impact Report were officially approved after eight years of formal studies. The Regional Connector is a light rail tunnel through Downtown Los Angeles that connects the former Metro Rail A, E, and L (Gold) Lines. The Little Tokyo/Arts District station was planned to be served by both the restructured A Line, connecting Long Beach and the San Gabriel Valley, and the restructured E Line, connecting Santa Monica and East Los Angeles. Due to this, Metro needed to rebuild the original Gold Line (renamed the L Line in 2020) station, underground, south of 1st Street to serve both lines. The decision to rebuild the station underground was partly driven by traffic concerns on Alameda and 1st Streets caused by at-grade trains.

The Regional Connector project started relocating utility pipes in December 2012 and heavy construction began two years later on September 30, 2014. Due to the relocation of tracks for the project, the at-grade station was briefly closed in early 2016. The station was again closed for a final time on October 24, 2020, before the new underground station opened 32 months later. Until the replacement station was completed, a bus bridge operated between Union Station and Pico/Aliso station for those riders traveling along the former L Line.

=== Current underground station ===
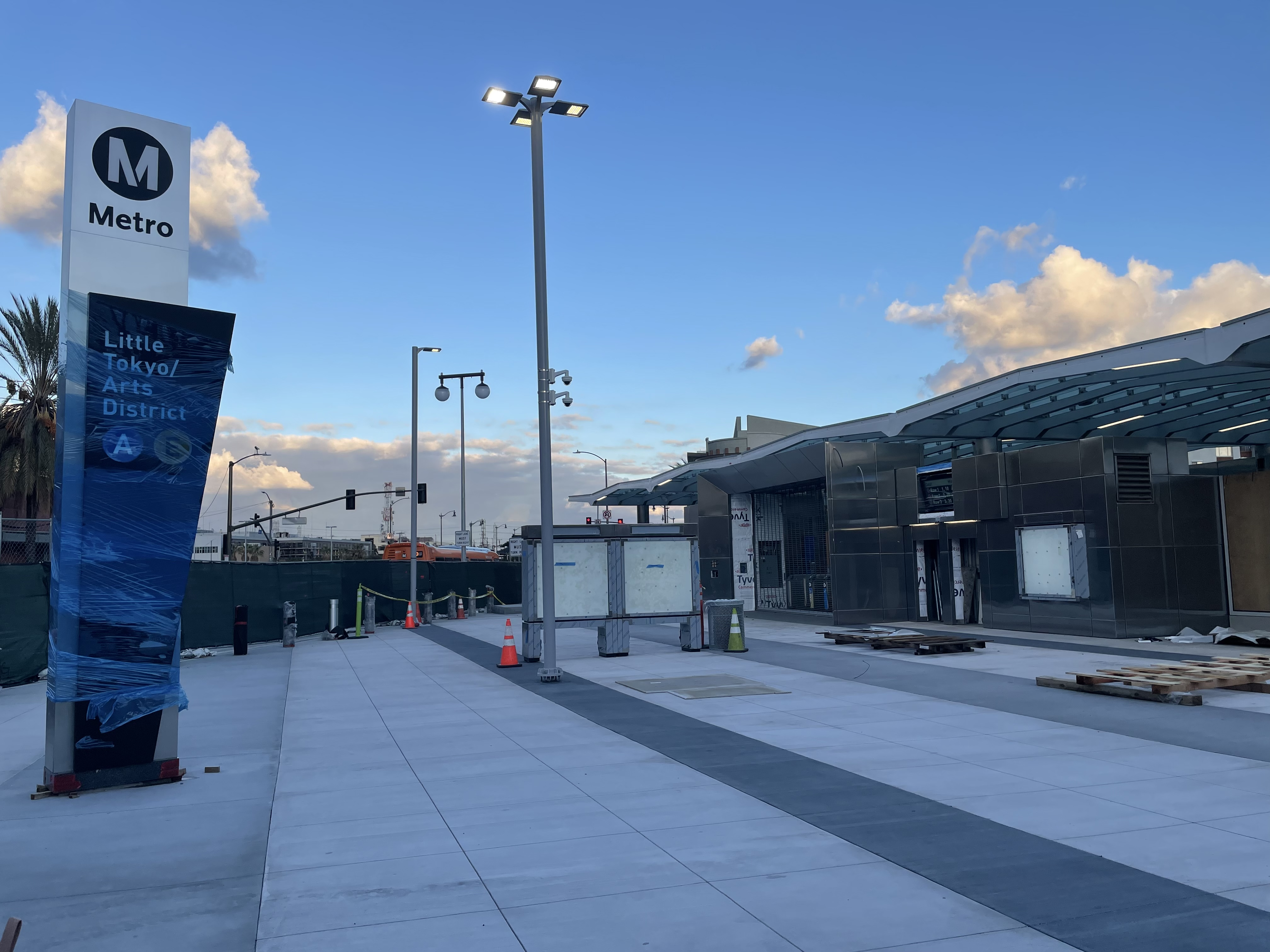
Little Tokyo/Arts District station plaza under construction in February 2023

When construction on the Regional Connector project started in September 2014, crews began building a replacement for the at-grade station. The rebuilt Little Tokyo/Arts District station is underground, located on the west side of Alameda Street with entrances 500 feet (150 m) south of the original station. The tunnel boring machines for the Regional Connector tunnel were also launched from that location. The station was originally referred to as 1st St/Central in planning documents but was ultimately assigned the same name as the previous at-grade station in early 2017.

Preliminary work for the underground station required the demolition of two modest single-story brick store buildings with one of the structures dating back to at least 1898. However, new developments are being built on the blocks surrounding the station.

Starting on April 9, 2023, the A, E, and L Line trains ran through the newly built station for final testing of the Regional Connector tunnel. The new Little Tokyo/Arts District station officially opened with the new tunnel on June 16, 2023.

Beyond the Regional Connector opening, the Southeast Gateway Line is planned to terminate downtown via a new light rail tunnel to Union Station. The line will feature a new transfer at Little Tokyo/Arts District station, which requires connecting the two subways with new infrastructure.

== Service ==
=== Hours and frequency ===
A Line service hours are from approximately 4:30 a.m. and 11:45 p.m. daily. Trains operate every 8 minutes during peak hours, Monday to Friday. Trains run every 10 minutes, during midday on weekdays and weekends, from 9:00 a.m. to 7:00 p.m. Night and early morning service is approximately every 20 minutes every day.

E Line service hours are from approximately 4:30 a.m. and 11:45 p.m daily. Trains operate every 8 minutes during peak hours, Monday to Friday. Trains run every 10 minutes, during midday on weekdays and weekends, from 9:00 a.m. to 7:00 p.m. Night and early morning service is approximately every 20 minutes every day.

=== Connections ===
As of December 15, 2024, the following connections are available:

- Los Angeles Metro Bus: 30, 74, 76
- LADOT DASH: A, D

== Notable places nearby ==
The station is within walking distance of the following notable places:

- Arts District
- East West Players
- Japanese American National Museum
- Little Tokyo
- Los Angeles Police Department headquarters building
- The Geffen Contemporary at MOCA
- National Japanese American Veterans Memorial Court
- Edward R. Roybal Federal Building and United States Courthouse
- Southern California Institute of Architecture
