= Grand/LATTC station =

Los Angeles Metro Rail station

Grand/LATTC
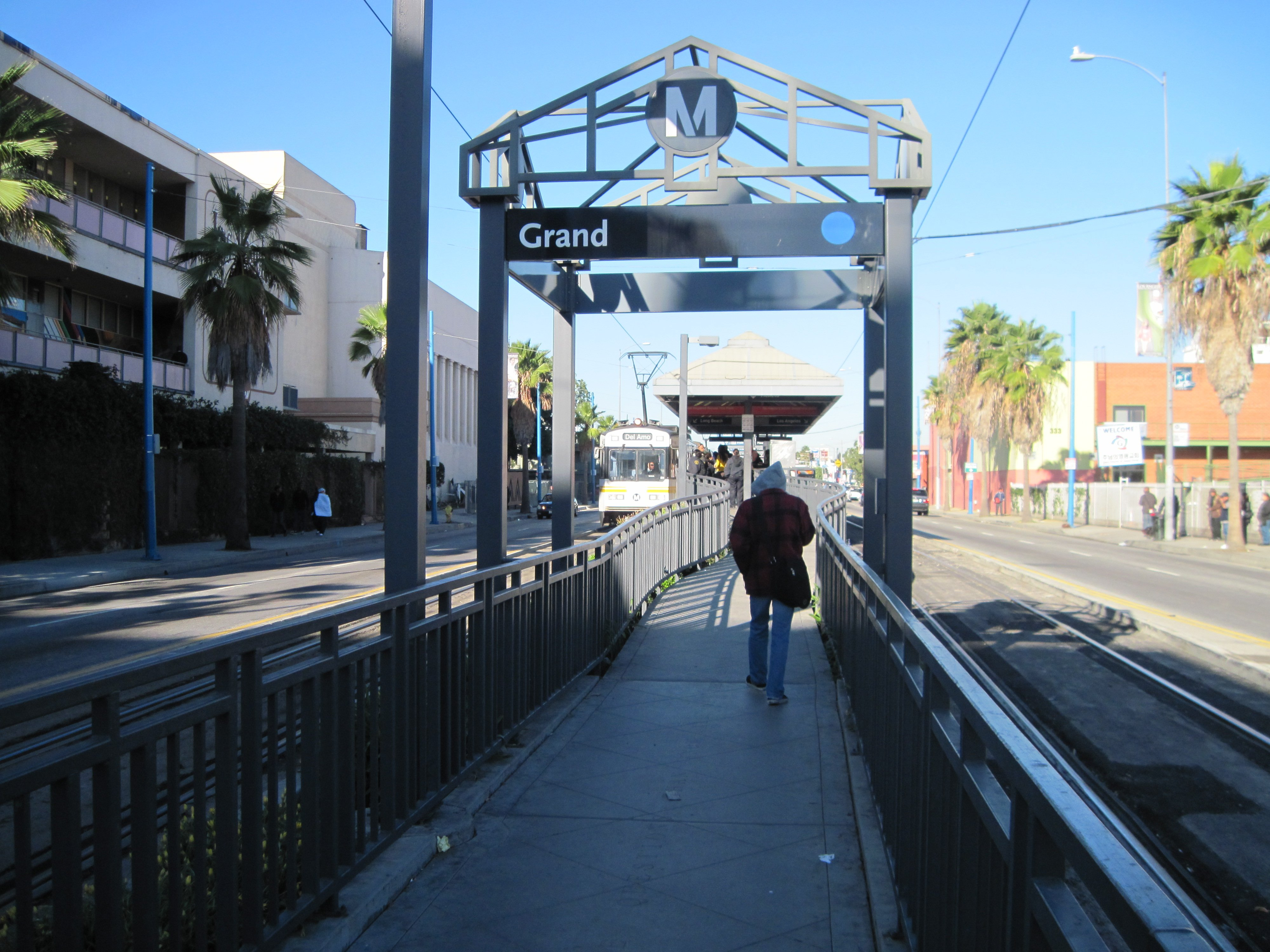
- Grand/LATTC station platform

General information
- Other names: Grand/Los Angeles Trade–Technical College
- Location: 331½ West Washington Boulevard; Los Angeles, California
- Coordinates: 34.0330°N 118.2690°W
- Owner: Los Angeles County Metropolitan Transportation Authority
- Platforms: 1 island platform
- Tracks: 2
- Connections: Los Angeles Metro Bus; LADOT DASH

Construction
- Structure type: At-grade
- Parking: Paid parking nearby
- Cycle facilities: Metro Bike Share station, racks and lockers
- Accessible: Yes

History
- Opened: July 14, 1990; 36 years ago
- Rebuilt: November 2, 2019
- Former names: Grand (1990–2014)

Passengers
- FY 2026: 2,197 (avg. wkdy boardings, rail only)

Services
Preceding station	Metro Rail	Following station
San Pedro Street toward Long Beach	A Line	Pico toward Pomona
Preceding station	Metro Busway	Following station
LATTC/Ortho Institute toward Harbor Gateway or San Pedro	J Line (street service)	Pico toward El Monte
Location

Grand/LATTC station is an at-grade light rail station on the A Line of the Los Angeles Metro Rail system. The station is located in the median of Washington Boulevard at its intersection with Grand Avenue next to Los Angeles Trade–Technical College (LATTC). One of the station's exits leads directly to the LATTC campus. The station also has nearby stops for the J Line of the Los Angeles Metro Busway system, southbound buses stop at the intersection of Flower Street and Washington Boulevard, one block to the west of the station, and northbound buses stop at the intersection of Figueroa Street and Washington Boulevard, two blocks to the west. In addition to the LATTC campus, the station also serves the South Los Angeles neighborhood.

== Service ==
=== Hours and frequency ===
A Line service hours are from approximately 4:30 a.m. and 11:45 p.m. daily. Trains operate every 8 minutes during peak hours, Monday to Friday. Trains run every 10 minutes, during midday on weekdays and weekends, from 9:00 a.m. to 7:00 p.m. Night and early morning service is approximately every 20 minutes every day.

J Line buses run 24 hours a day between El Monte, Downtown Los Angeles, and the Harbor Gateway Transit Center, as route 910. Some trips continue to San Pedro between 6 a.m. and 8 p.m. and are signed as Route 950. On weekdays, buses operate every four to eight minutes during peak hours. They operate every 10 minutes in the midday, 20 minutes during evenings, 40 minutes during nights, and every hour overnight. On weekends, buses arrive every 15 minutes most of the day. They operate every 20 minutes during evenings, 40 minutes during nights, and every hour overnight.

=== Connections ===
As of December 15, 2024, the following connections are available:

- LADOT DASH: D, Pico Union/Echo Park
- Los Angeles Metro Bus: 14, 35, 37, 38, 55, 93, 460

== Notable places nearby ==
The station is within walking distance of the following notable places:

- Grand Olympic Auditorium
- Mount St. Mary's College, Doheny Campus
- Lanterman High School
- Los Angeles Trade Technical College
- Los Angeles Orthopedic Hospital
- Los Angeles County Superior Court, Metropolitan Courthouse
- St. Vincent de Paul Roman Catholic Church
