= San Dimas station =

Light rail station in San Dimas, California

San Dimas
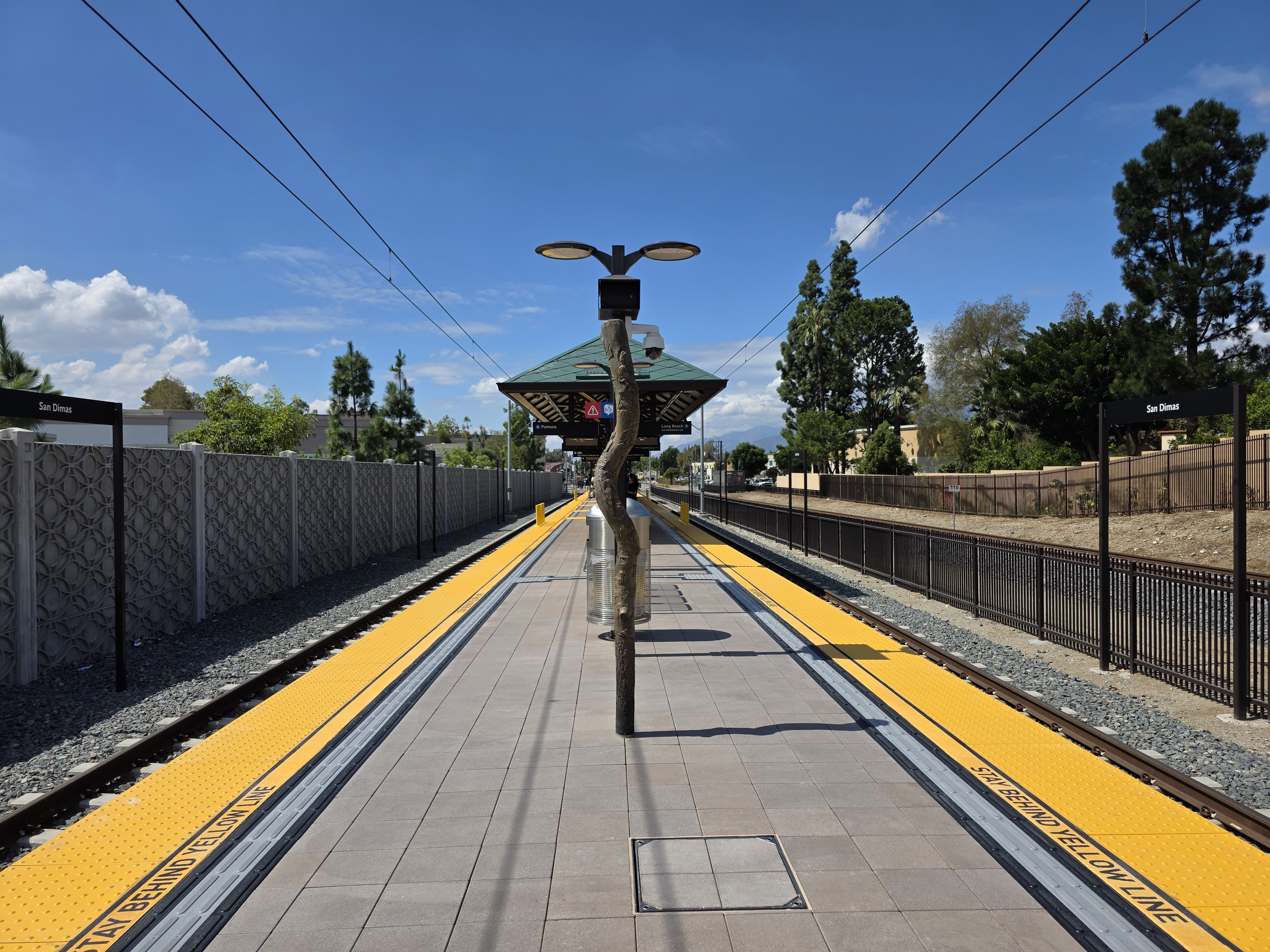
- San Dimas station platform on opening day, September 19, 2025

General information
- Coordinates: 34.105197°N 117.805967°W
- Owner: Los Angeles Metro
- Platforms: 1 island platform
- Tracks: 2
- Connections: Foothill Transit

Construction
- Parking: 280 spaces
- Accessible: Yes

History
- Opened: September 19, 2025; 11 months ago

Passengers
- FY 2026: 461 (avg. wkdy boardings)

Services
| Preceding station | Metro Rail | Following station |
|---|---|---|
| Glendora toward Long Beach | A Line | La Verne/Fairplex toward Pomona |
Former services (at AT&SF station)
| Preceding station | Atchison, Topeka and Santa Fe Railway | Following station |
|---|---|---|
| Glendora toward Los Angeles | Main Line Via Pasadena, Pomona | La Verne toward Chicago |
Location

San Dimas station is an at-grade light rail station in the Los Angeles Metro Rail system. The station is located on San Dimas Avenue near its intersection with Bonita Avenue along the Pasadena Subdivision right of way in San Dimas, California. It is served by the A Line. As the second station on the Foothill Extension Phase 2B to Pomona project, it was officially dedicated with a ceremony on June 7, 2025, featuring regional politicians and a celebration for the general public. It opened on September 19, 2025.

A city-owned park and ride facility is located adjacent to the facility at 205 S San Dimas Avenue. The former Atchison, Topeka and Santa Fe Railway San Dimas Depot is located about 1/5 mile (0.32 km) to the northwest and houses the Pacific Railroad Museum.

The San Dimas A Line Station has a single island platform and two TAP to exit gates with validators. The entrance is at Bonita Avenue.

== Service ==
=== Hours and frequency ===
A Line service hours are from approximately 4:30 a.m. and 11:45 p.m. daily. Trains operate every 8 minutes during peak hours, Monday to Friday. Trains run every 10 minutes, during midday on weekdays and weekends, from 9:00 a.m. to 7:00 p.m. Night and early morning service is approximately every 20 minutes every day.

=== Connections ===
The following connections are available:

- Foothill Transit: 295, 492

== Notable places nearby ==
The station is within walking distance of the following notable places:

- Raging Waters Los Angeles, one of California's largest water parks
- The Pacific Railroad Museum, a museum and library in the former AT&SF San Dimas Depot on Bonita Ave., operated by the Pacific Railroad Society
- Frank G. Bonelli Regional Park
- Civic Center Park
