= San Pedro Street station =

Los Angeles Metro Rail station

San Pedro St
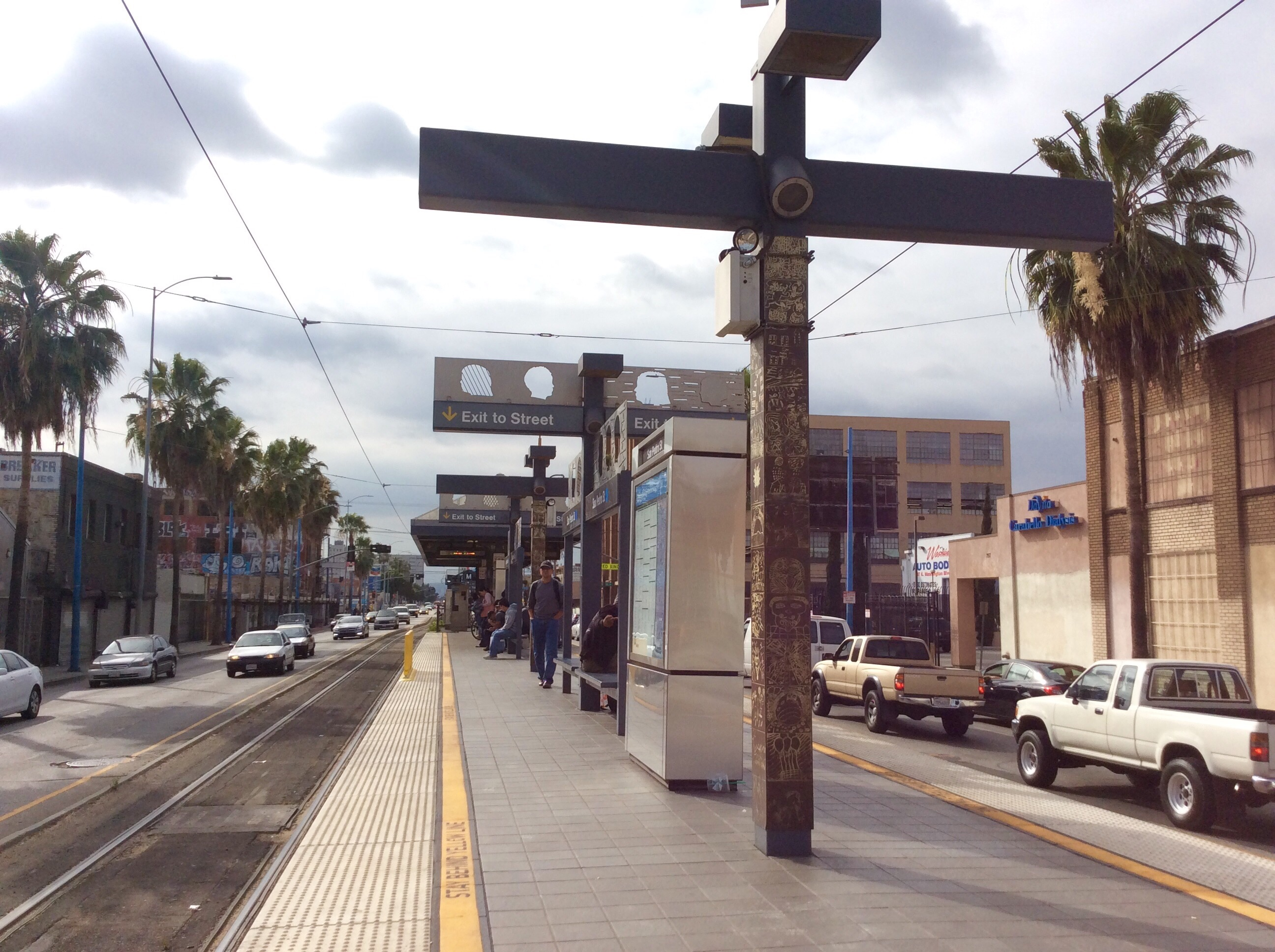
- San Pedro Street station platform

General information
- Location: 767 East Washington Boulevard; Los Angeles, California
- Coordinates: 34.0272°N 118.2562°W
- Owner: Los Angeles County Metropolitan Transportation Authority
- Platforms: 1 island platform
- Tracks: 2
- Connections: Los Angeles Metro Bus; LADOT DASH; Montebello Bus Lines

Construction
- Structure type: At-grade
- Parking: Paid parking nearby
- Cycle facilities: Metro Bike Share station
- Accessible: Yes

History
- Opened: July 14, 1990; 36 years ago
- Rebuilt: November 2, 2019

Passengers
- FY 2025: 1,506 (avg. wkdy boardings)

Services
Preceding station	Metro Rail	Following station
Washington toward Long Beach	A Line	Grand/LATTC toward Pomona
Location

San Pedro Street station is an at-grade light rail station on the A Line of the Los Angeles Metro Rail system. The station is located in the median of Washington Boulevard near its intersection with San Pedro Street, after which the station is named, in Los Angeles, California.

== Service ==
=== Hours and frequency ===
A Line trains run every day between approximately 4:00 a.m. and 12:30 am. Trains operate every ten minutes during peak hours Monday through Friday, every twelve minutes during the daytime on weekdays and all day on the weekends after approximately 8 a.m. (with a 15/20-minute headway early Saturday and Sunday mornings). Night service is every 20 minutes.

=== Connections ===
As of December 15, 2024, the following connections are available:

- LADOT DASH: E, King-East
- Los Angeles Metro Bus: 51
- Montebello Bus Lines: 50
