= Washington station (Los Angeles Metro) =

Los Angeles Metro Rail station

Washington
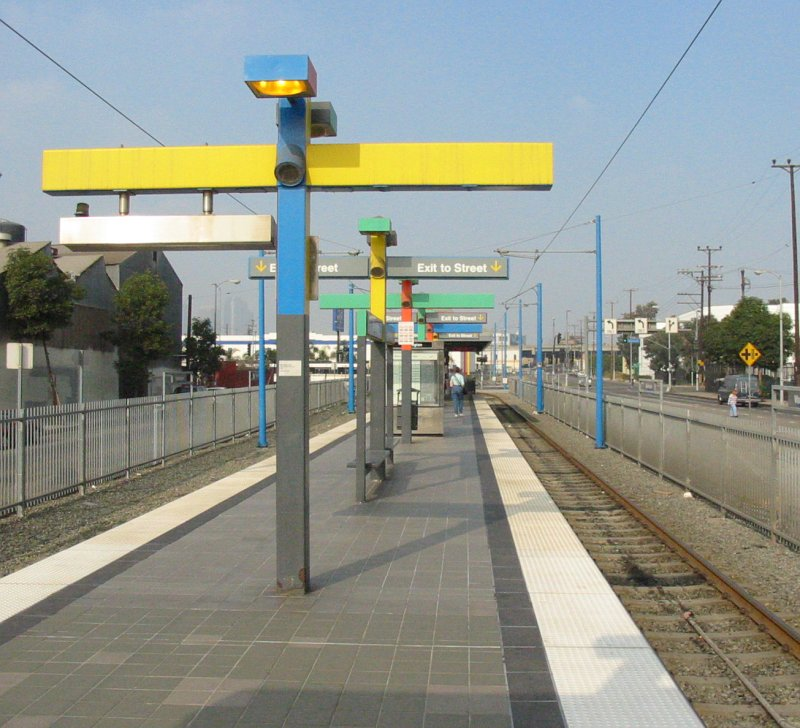
- Washington station platform

General information
- Location: 1945 Long Beach Avenue; Los Angeles, California
- Coordinates: 34.0204°N 118.2431°W
- Owner: Los Angeles County Metropolitan Transportation Authority
- Platforms: 1 island platform
- Tracks: 2
- Connections: Montebello Bus Lines

Construction
- Structure type: At-grade
- Accessible: Yes

History
- Opened: July 14, 1990; 36 years ago
- Rebuilt: November 2, 2019

Passengers
- FY 2025: 1,003 (avg. wkdy boardings)

Services
Preceding station	Metro Rail	Following station
Vernon toward Long Beach	A Line	San Pedro Street toward Pomona
Location

Washington station is an at-grade light rail station on the A Line of the Los Angeles Metro Rail system. The station is located in the center median of Long Beach Avenue (the historic route of the Pacific Electric Railway and shared with the Union Pacific freight railroad's Wilmington Subdivision) at its intersection with Washington Boulevard, in South Los Angeles.

At this station, the A Line changes from the roughly northwest-to-southeast direction down the center of Washington Boulevard to the north–south direction down the center median of Long Beach Avenue.

== Service ==
=== Hours and frequency ===
A Line service hours are from approximately 4:30 a.m. and 11:45 p.m. daily. Trains operate every 8 minutes during peak hours, Monday to Friday. Trains run every 10 minutes, during midday on weekdays and weekends, from 9:00 a.m. to 7:00 p.m. Night and early morning service is approximately every 20 minutes every day.

=== Connections ===
As of December 15, 2024, the following connections are available:

- Montebello Bus Lines: 50

== Notable places nearby ==
The station is within walking distance of the following notable places:

- Jefferson High School
