= A Line (Los Angeles Metro) =

Light rail line in Los Angeles County, California

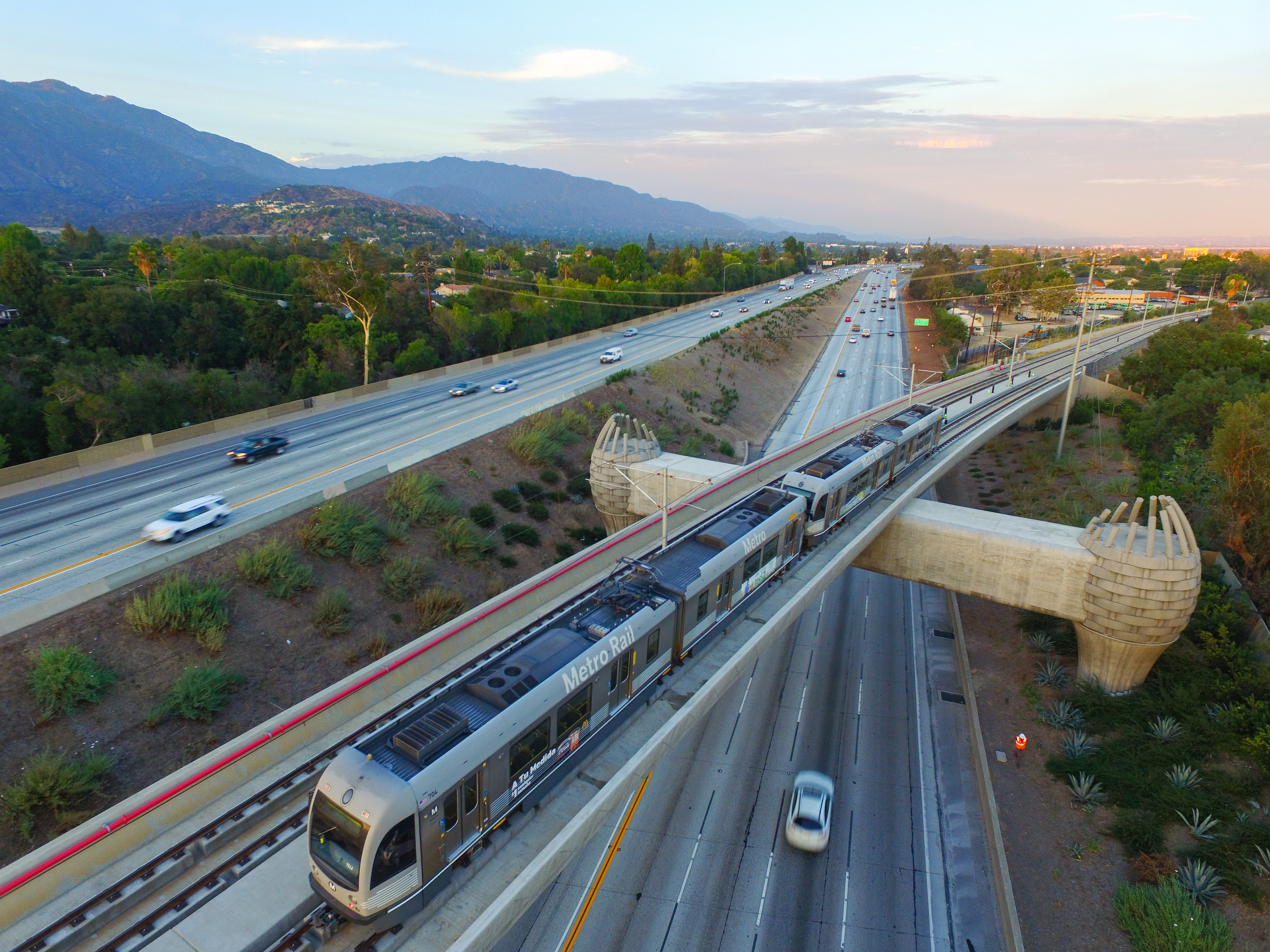
- Foothill Freeway overpass east of Sierra Madre Villa station in 2015

Overview
- Other name(s): Blue Line (1990–2019); Gold Line/L Line (north of Little Tokyo/Arts District)
- Owner: Los Angeles Metro
- Line number: 801
- Termini: Pomona North; Downtown Long Beach
- Stations: 48
- Website: metro.net/riding/guide/a-line

Service
- Type: Light rail
- System: Los Angeles Metro Rail
- Depot(s): Division 11 (Long Beach); Division 24 (Monrovia)
- Rolling stock: Siemens P2000, AnsaldoBreda P2550, or Kinki Sharyo P3010 running in 2- or 3-car consists
- Daily ridership: 73,490 (weekday, March 2026) ▲
- Ridership: 22,269,829 (2025) ▼0.1%

History
- Opened: July 14, 1990; 36 years ago

Technical
- Line length: 57.7 mi (92.9 km)
- Number of tracks: 2 (except single track Long Beach loop)
- Character: Mostly at-grade in private right of way, with some street-running, elevated and underground sections
- Track gauge: 4 ft 8 1/2 in (1,435 mm) standard gauge
- Electrification: Overhead line, 750 V DC
- Operating speed: 55 mph (89 km/h) (max.); 26 mph (42 km/h) (avg.)
Route map
A Line highlighted in blue

The A Line (formerly and colloquially the Blue Line) is a light rail line in Los Angeles County, California. Part of the Los Angeles Metro Rail system and operated by Los Angeles Metro, it is the world's longest modern light rail line at 57.7 miles (92.9 km). The A Line serves 48 stations, running east–west between Pomona and Pasadena, then north–south between Pasadena and Long Beach. In Downtown Los Angeles it interlines with the E Line, sharing five stations. Service operates about 19 hours daily with headways as short as 8 minutes during peak hours. It is the busiest light rail route in the system, carrying over 22 million riders in 2024 and averaging 69,216 weekday boardings in May 2024.

The A Line's first segment, between the southern edge of Downtown Los Angeles and Long Beach, opened in 1990 as the inaugural line of the Metro Rail system, using much of the Pacific Electric's former Long Beach Line. Plans to extend the line north through Downtown Los Angeles to Pasadena were proposed in the 1980s but delayed due to funding constraints. Instead, the standalone Gold Line (renamed the L Line in 2020) opened in 2003 from Union Station at the northern edge of Downtown Los Angeles to Pasadena, and was extended east to Azusa in 2016. The original plan was realized with the completion of the Regional Connector tunnel across Downtown Los Angeles in 2023, which linked the A Line to the former L Line. The line was extended further east to Pomona in 2025.

== Service description ==
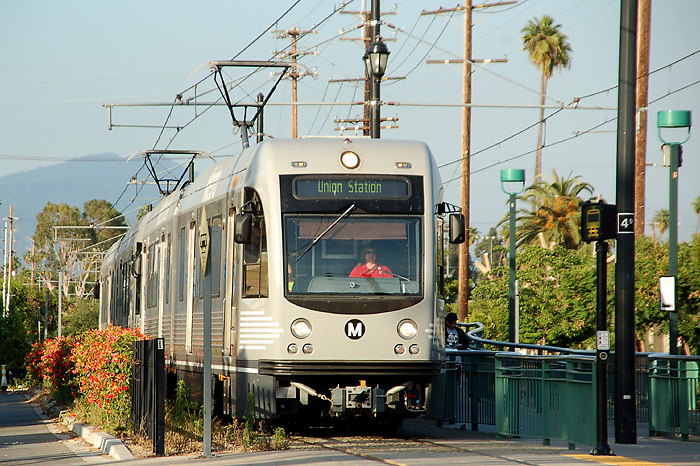
A southbound A Line train departing Highland Park station

=== Route description ===
The A Line runs 57.7 miles (92.9 km) between Pomona and Downtown Long Beach, serving 48 stations.

The line's northern terminus is at Pomona North station in Pomona, shared with the Metrolink San Bernardino Line. The line briefly runs northwest, entering La Verne before stopping at La Verne/Fairplex station, located adjacent to the campus of University of La Verne. The line continues northwest, entering San Dimas before stopping at San Dimas station at San Dimas Avenue. The line continues northwest, entering Glendora and crossing underneath the SR 57 and I-210 freeways, curving through the city, before stopping at Glendora station at Vermont Avenue. The line continues northwest, curving west and entering Azusa before stopping at APU/Citrus College station just west of Citrus Avenue and north of the two universities. The line runs west through Azusa before stopping at Azusa Downtown station at Azusa Avenue, north of Foothill Boulevard. Continuing west, the line crosses over the I-210 freeway and runs parallel to it, entering Irwindale before stopping at Irwindale station at Irwindale Avenue. After this station, the line continues west, crossing over the San Gabriel River and underneath the I-605 freeway, diverging from I-210 and entering Duarte, before stopping at Duarte/City of Hope station located on the north side of Duarte Road, across from the City of Hope National Medical Center.

Continuing west, the line parallels Duarte Road, entering Monrovia, before diverging northwest just before arriving at Monrovia station. Entering Arcadia, the line crosses all street crossings on bridges except for First Avenue at the at-grade Arcadia station. Continuing west, the line reconverges with and enters the median of I-210 and continues west to Sierra Madre Villa station in Pasadena. Six stations serve different parts of Pasadena, with three of them in the freeway's median. In Old Pasadena, the line travels underground for almost half a mile, passing under Pasadena's main thoroughfare, Colorado Boulevard, which makes the Memorial Park station below grade. The station serves most of Pasadena's fine dining, shops, malls, and civic center. The line continues south through downtown Pasadena and South Pasadena, primarily at grade. North of Highland Park, the line crosses over the Arroyo Seco Parkway (State Route 110) via the Santa Fe Arroyo Seco Railroad Bridge towards Highland Park.

After Highland Park station, the line runs in the median of Marmion Way, where trains go at only 20 miles per hour (32 km/h). After Avenue 50, the line runs primarily at grade in its own right of way, except for a short tunnel underneath the intersection of Figueroa Street and Pasadena Avenue. From here, the line continues, with a handful of stations serving the hillside areas north of downtown, including Lincoln Heights, Mount Washington, and the Southwest Museum of the American Indian. Northeast of Chinatown, the line crosses over the Los Angeles River on an elevated viaduct. Continuing on the elevated viaduct, the line stops at Chinatown station before arriving at Union Station. At Union Station, passengers can transfer to the B and D rapid transit lines, Metrolink commuter rail, Amtrak, and buses. The entire section of the line north of Union Station follows the current and former right of way of the Pasadena Subdivision, which was originally built by the Los Angeles and San Gabriel Valley Railroad between 1883 and 1887.

South of Union Station, trains use the Regional Connector through Downtown Los Angeles. In Little Tokyo, the line enters the new tunnel north of Temple Street to serve the replacement underground Little Tokyo/Arts District station, where the line merges with the E Line. The two lines turn west to run under 2nd Street and the 2nd Street Tunnel, as well as the B and D lines, with clearances as low as 7 feet (2.1 m). The Regional Connector tunnel connects to the north end of 7th Street/Metro Center station, the former northern terminal of the A Line. The line continues south along Flower Street, transitioning from underground to street level at 11th St. Passengers can connect to the bus rapid transit J Line at 7th Street/Metro Center, Pico, and Grand/LATTC stations.

The A and E Lines diverge at Flower Street and Washington Boulevard. E Line trains continue south along Flower Street, and the A Line turns east onto Washington Boulevard before turning south into the former Pacific Electric right of way at Long Beach Avenue. This historic rail corridor has four tracks, two for A Line trains and two for Union Pacific freight trains. Along the corridor, there are some flyovers to either eliminate grade crossings in more densely populated areas or pass over diverging freight tracks. Passengers can connect with the C Line at the Willowbrook/Rosa Parks station. Just south of Willow Street station, A Line trains exit the rail corridor and begin street running in the median of Long Beach Boulevard into the city of Long Beach, where trains travel through the Long Beach Transit Mall while making a loop using 1st Street, Pacific Avenue, and 8th Street.

=== Hours and frequency ===
A Line service hours are from approximately 4:30 a.m. and 11:45 p.m. daily. Trains operate every 8 minutes during peak hours, Monday to Friday. Trains run every 10 minutes, during midday on weekdays and weekends, from 9:00 a.m. to 7:00 p.m. Night and early morning service is approximately every 20 minutes every day.

Time	4a	5a	6a	7a	8a–1p	2–6p	7p	8p–12a
Weekdays	20		8		10	8	10–12	20
Weekends/Holidays	20			10			10–12	20

=== Speed ===
The full travel time of the 57.7-mile (92.9 km) line is about 2 hours and 12 minutes, including a brief layover at Union Station for a crew change. The line's scheduled average speed is 26 miles per hour (42 km/h), with maximum speeds ranging from under 10 miles per hour (16 km/h) at surface level in Downtown Los Angeles to 55 miles per hour (89 km/h) on dedicated corridors.

=== Station listing ===
The following table lists the stations of the A Line, from north to south:

Station	Date Opened	City/Neighborhood	Major connections and notes	Grade
Pomona North	September 19, 2025	Pomona	Park and ride: 530 spaces San Bernardino	At-grade
La Verne/Fairplex	September 19, 2025	La Verne	Park and ride: 262 spaces	At-grade
San Dimas	September 19, 2025	San Dimas	Park and ride: 280 spaces	At-grade
Glendora	September 19, 2025	Glendora	Park and ride: 298 spaces	At-grade
APU/Citrus College	March 5, 2016	Azusa	Park and ride: 206 spaces	At-grade
Azusa Downtown	March 5, 2016	Azusa	Park and ride: 534 spaces	At-grade
Irwindale	March 5, 2016	Irwindale	Park and ride: 350 spaces	At-grade
Duarte/City of Hope	March 5, 2016	Duarte	Park and ride: 125 spaces	At-grade
Monrovia	March 5, 2016	Monrovia	Park and ride: 350 spaces	At-grade
Arcadia	March 5, 2016	Arcadia	Park and ride: 302 spaces	At-grade
Sierra Madre Villa	July 26, 2003	Pasadena	Park and ride: 1,017 spaces	At-grade
Allen	July 26, 2003	Pasadena		Elevated
Lake	July 26, 2003	Pasadena	Park and ride: 22 spaces	Below-grade
Memorial Park	July 26, 2003	Pasadena	Future connection to the North Hollywood to Pasadena Bus Rapid Transit Project	Below-grade
Del Mar	July 26, 2003	Pasadena	Park and ride: 610 spaces	At-grade
Fillmore	July 26, 2003	Pasadena	Park and ride: 155 spaces	At-grade
South Pasadena	July 26, 2003	South Pasadena	Park and ride: 142 spaces	At-grade
Highland Park	July 26, 2003	Los Angeles (Highland Park)		At-grade
Southwest Museum	July 26, 2003	Los Angeles (Mount Washington)		At-grade
Heritage Square	July 26, 2003	Los Angeles (Montecito Heights)	Park and ride: 129 spaces	At-grade
Lincoln/Cypress	July 26, 2003	Los Angeles (Lincoln Heights/Cypress Park)	Park and ride: 94 spaces	Elevated
Chinatown	July 26, 2003	Los Angeles (Chinatown)		Elevated
Union Station	July 26, 2003	Los Angeles (Downtown)	Amtrak, LAX FlyAway and Metrolink; Paid parking: 2,189 spaces	At-grade
Little Tokyo/Arts District	November 15, 2009	Los Angeles (Little Tokyo/Arts District)	E Line	Underground
Historic Broadway	June 16, 2023	Los Angeles (Downtown)	E Line	Underground
Grand Avenue Arts/Bunker Hill	June 16, 2023	Los Angeles (Downtown)	E Line J Line	Underground
7th Street/Metro Center	February 15, 1991	Los Angeles (Downtown)	B Line D Line E Line J Line	Underground
Pico	July 14, 1990	Los Angeles (Downtown)	E Line J Line	At-grade
Grand/LATTC	July 14, 1990	Los Angeles (Downtown)	J Line	At-grade
San Pedro Street	July 14, 1990	Los Angeles (South Los Angeles)		At-grade
Washington	July 14, 1990	Los Angeles (South Los Angeles)		At-grade
Vernon	July 14, 1990	Los Angeles (South Los Angeles)		At-grade
Slauson	July 14, 1990	Los Angeles (South Los Angeles)	Future connection to the Southeast Gateway Line	Elevated
Florence	July 14, 1990	Florence-Graham	Park and ride: 116 spaces	At-grade
Firestone	July 14, 1990	Florence-Graham		Elevated
103rd Street/Watts Towers	July 14, 1990	Los Angeles (Watts)	Park and ride: 64 spaces	At-grade
Willowbrook/Rosa Parks	July 14, 1990	Willowbrook	Park and ride: 234 spaces	At-grade
Compton	July 14, 1990	Compton		At-grade
Artesia	July 14, 1990	Compton	Park and ride: 290 spaces	At-grade
Del Amo	July 14, 1990	Carson	Park and ride: 362 spaces	Elevated
Wardlow	July 14, 1990	Long Beach	Park and ride: 139 spaces	At-grade
Willow Street	July 14, 1990	Long Beach	Park and ride: 1,068 spaces	At-grade
Pacific Coast Highway	July 14, 1990	Long Beach		At-grade
Anaheim Street	July 14, 1990	Long Beach		At-grade
5th Street (SB)	September 1, 1990	Long Beach		At-grade
1st Street (SB)	September 1, 1990	Long Beach		At-grade
Downtown Long Beach (NB)	September 1, 1990	Long Beach		At-grade
Pacific Avenue (NB)	September 1, 1990	Long Beach		At-grade

=== Ridership ===
Annual ridership
Year	Ridership	%±
2009	25,735,979	—
2010	25,119,753	−2.4%
2011	26,053,645	+3.7%
2012	28,959,483	+11.2%
2013	28,185,745	−2.7%
2014	27,276,468	−3.2%
2015	24,457,253	−10.3%
2016	24,988,825	+2.2%
2017	22,383,828	−10.4%
2018	19,836,016	−11.4%
2019	8,905,140	−55.1%
2020	9,290,318	+4.3%
2021	9,099,416	−2.1%
2022	11,350,035	+24.7%
2023	15,819,994	+39.4%
2024	22,282,648	+40.9%
2025	22,269,829	−0.1%
Source: Metro

== History ==
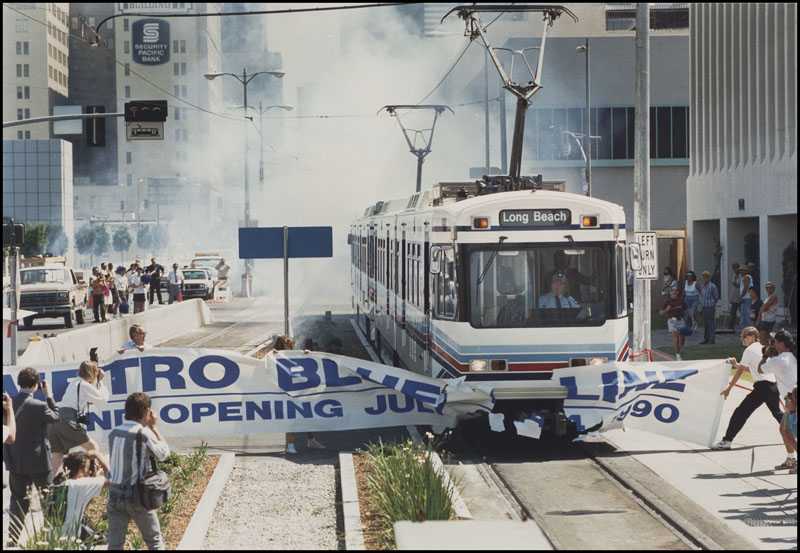
LA Metro Blue Line (now A Line) opening celebration on July 14, 1990

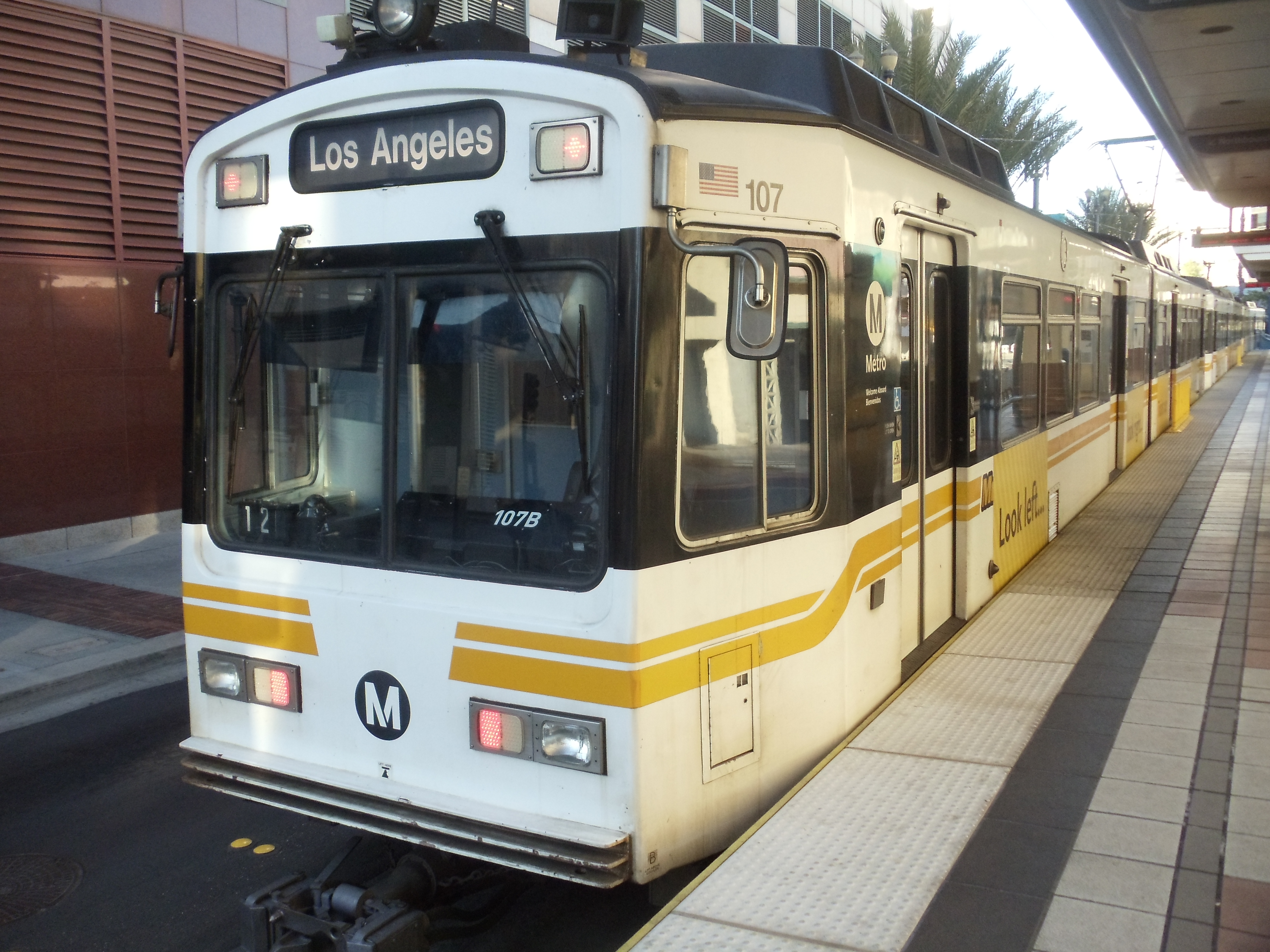
Nippon Sharyo P865 train (now retired) leaving Downtown Long Beach station.

=== Long Beach Line ===
Much of the initial segment of the A Line from Downtown Los Angeles to Long Beach follows the route of the Pacific Electric's Long Beach Line, which ended service in 1961. The old route gave the new light rail trains a private right of way between Washington and Willow Street stations allowing them to reach higher speeds between stops.

The line initially opened as the Blue Line on Saturday, July 14, 1990, and ran from Pico to Anaheim Street. The Long Beach Loop section to Long Beach opened in September 1990, followed by the tunnel into 7th Street/Metro Center in February 1991. The initial light rail segment cost US$877 million ($2.16 billion in 2025 adjusted for inflation).

The route reached full capacity after one decade of service, and from 1999 to 2001, the Blue Line underwent a US$11 million project to lengthen 19 of its platforms to accommodate three-car trains. There were also plans since the 1980s to extend the Blue Line north to Pasadena but the connection through downtown was postponed due to funding constraints from the voter-approved 1998 Proposition A. The proposition restricted local county subway funding, halting the process of the Blue Line extension and other rail transit projects from advancing.

The Blue Line was renovated in 2019, with the southern half of the line being closed for the first five months and the northern half closing for the following five months (10 months total). Metro provided a bus shuttle service to compensate for the lack of rail service. Metro officially reopened the line on November 2, 2019, rebranding it as the A Line. The renovation helped improve the line's speed and reliability by replacing and modernizing old tracks, signals, train control systems, and bridges.

=== Pasadena Blue Line ===
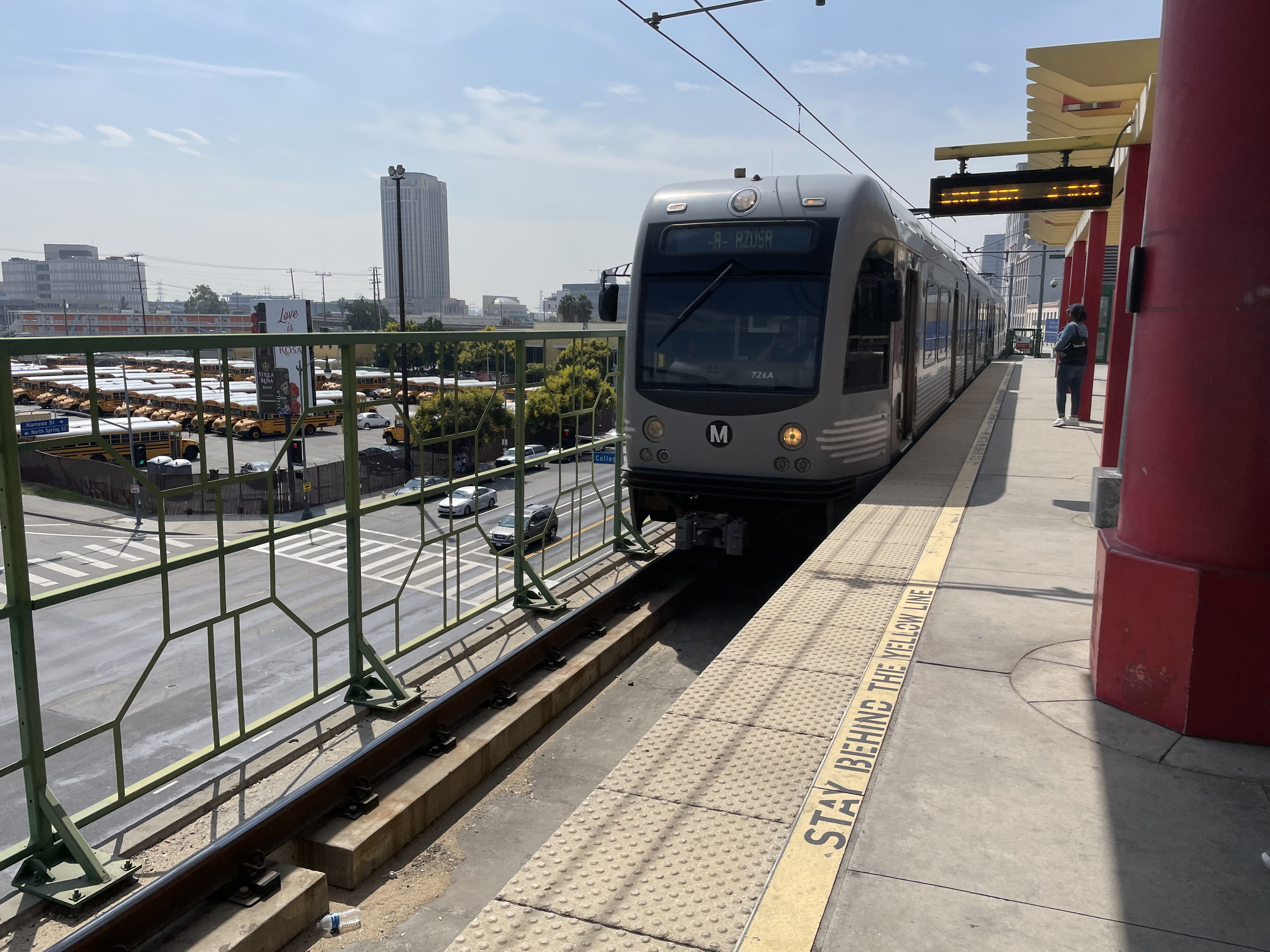
AnsaldoBreda P2550 train at Chinatown station

Much of the A Line's right of way north of Union Station through the San Gabriel Valley was built by the Los Angeles and San Gabriel Valley Railroad in 1885. It was eventually taken over by the Atchison, Topeka and Santa Fe Railway, as part of the Pasadena Subdivision, which saw Amtrak service until 1994, when construction began on the conversion to light rail. The light rail project was initially called the "Pasadena Metro Blue Line."

Planners envisioned extending the existing Blue Line (A Line) north of 7th Street/Metro Center, but it was canceled due to funding shortages. However, the mostly above-ground segment of the extension from Union Station to Pasadena advanced and began construction in 1994 as a separate line but was suspended again by 1998 due to the Proposition A ban. Later that year, a bill was authorized to create a new independent construction authority to finish the line. The agency, now known as the Foothill Gold Line Construction Authority, resumed light rail construction in 2000 and completed the line three years later.

The then-renamed Gold Line, between Union Station and Sierra Madre Villa station in East Pasadena, opened on July 26, 2003.

=== Foothill Extension Phase 2A ===
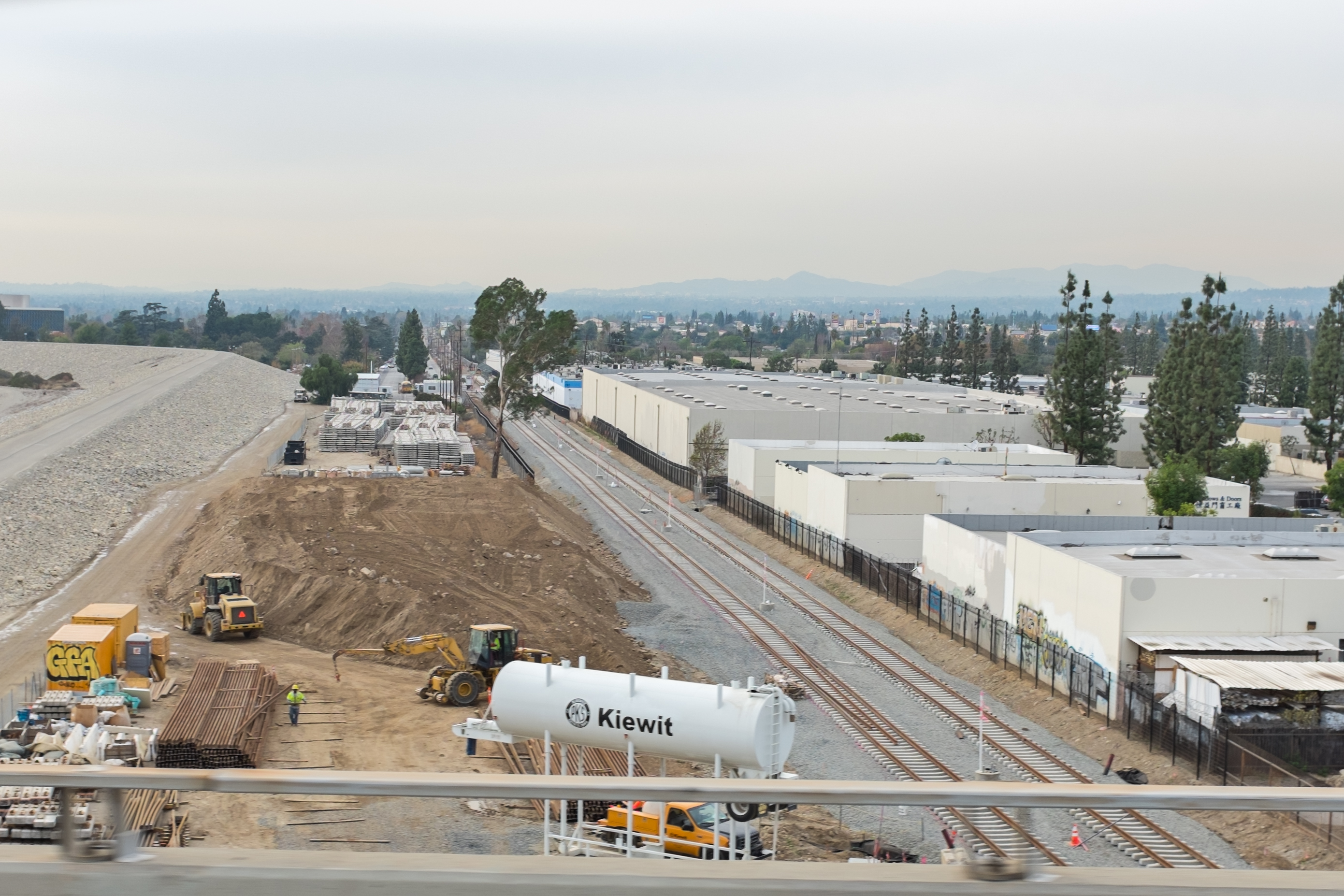
Construction of Foothill Extension Phase 2A, near Duarte in 2014. Tracks were laid, but the overhead catenary was not yet installed.

In 2016, the Gold Line was extended east from Pasadena as part of Phase 2A (Phase 1 was the initial Los Angeles to Pasadena segment) of the Foothill Extension, running between Sierra Madre Villa and APU/Citrus College stations in Azusa. The extension was constructed by the Foothill Gold Line Construction Authority and added six new stations to the Gold Line serving the cities of Arcadia, Monrovia, Duarte, Irwindale, and Azusa. A groundbreaking ceremony for Phase 2A was held on June 26, 2010; construction began the following summer and was completed in September 2015, with the extension entering service on March 5, 2016.

Like other lines in the Los Angeles Metro system, the Gold Line's designation became a letter in 2020. This was the beginning of a process where all Metro Rail and Busway lines would be identified by a letter name rather than a system of colors. The Gold Line was renamed to the L Line.

=== Regional Connector ===
The alignment of the Regional Connector Transit Project

The Regional Connector Transit Project constructed a 1.9-mile (3.1 km) light rail tunnel across Downtown Los Angeles that connected A and E lines to the L Line, with the purpose of reducing transfers and travel times through downtown. The project completed the late 1990s vision of the "Pasadena Blue Line," connecting the northern (Union Station–Azusa) segment of the L Line to the A Line. This enabled A Line trains to run from Long Beach to Azusa through the new tunnel. The southern (Pico/Aliso–East LA) segment was combined with the existing E Line between Downtown Los Angeles and Santa Monica. The new east-west line kept the E Line name but uses the L Line's gold color. Two new stations were also constructed in the tunnel, providing more service to destinations and communities in Downtown Los Angeles.

Formal studies and planning for the Regional Connector began in 2004 and was approved in 2012. A groundbreaking ceremony was held on September 30, 2014, marking the start of major construction. To accommodate the new tunnel, the existing at-grade L Line Little Tokyo/Arts District station was demolished in 2020 and rebuilt as a subway station approximately 500 feet (150 m) south and on the opposite side of Alameda Street from its former location. Starting on April 9, 2023, the A, E, and L Line trains ran through the Regional Connector tunnel for final testing. The project officially opened for revenue service on June 16, 2023.

Once the Regional Connector was completed, the alignment of the L Line was split into two parts at Little Tokyo/Arts District station, with the portion north of the station joined to the A Line, extending it to connect Long Beach with Azusa. With this change, the A Line officially became the longest, modern day light rail line in the world. The alignment east of Little Tokyo/Arts District station was assigned to the E Line, extending it to connect Santa Monica and East Los Angeles directly. At this time, the L Line ceased to exist as a separate line.

=== Foothill Extension Phase 2B to Pomona ===
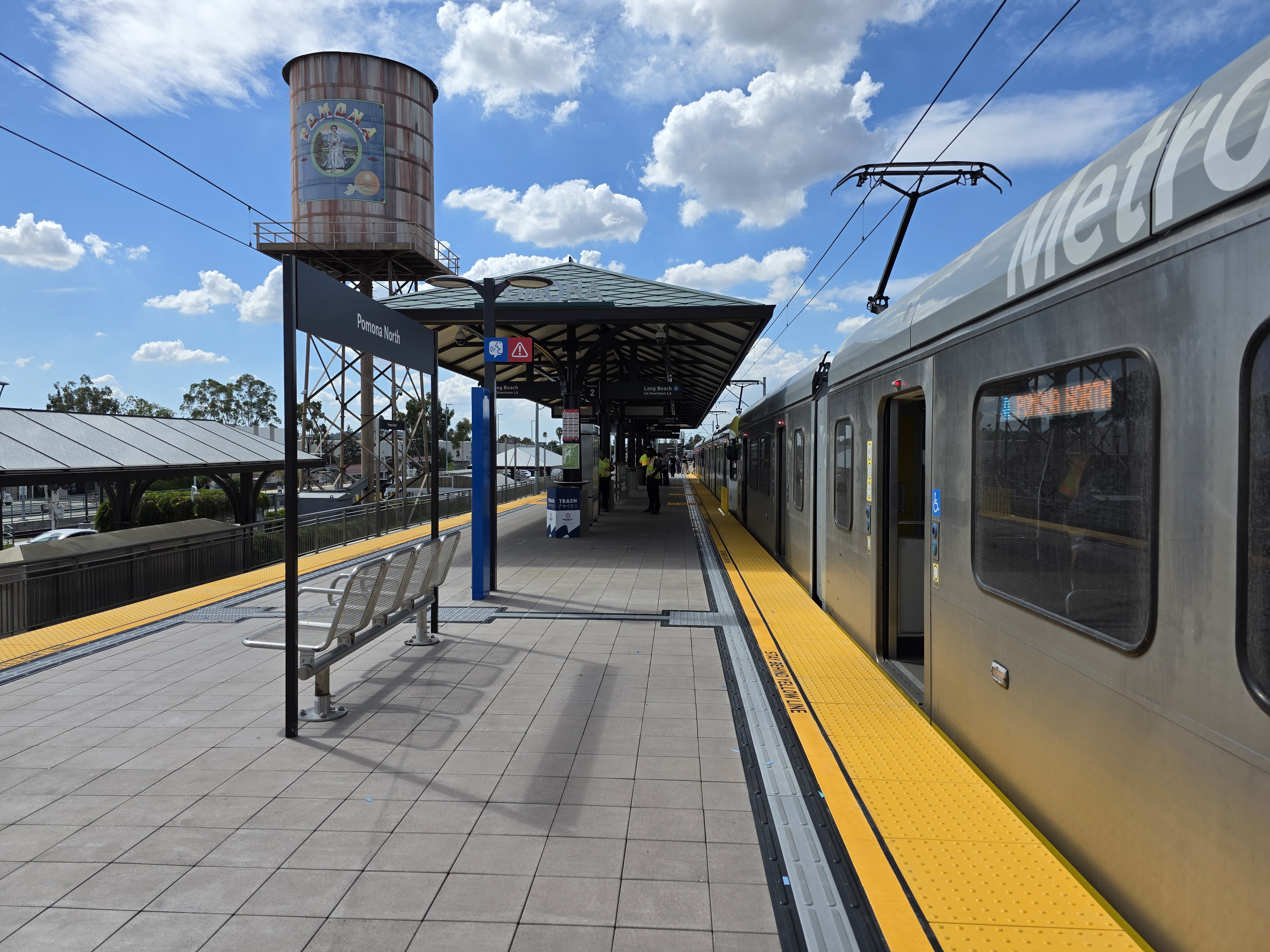
Pomona North station platform on opening day, September 19, 2025

The first part of Phase 2B of the Foothill Extension, running between APU/Citrus College station in Azusa and Pomona North station in Pomona, opened on September 19, 2025. This section, like the original Gold Line to Pasadena, and Phase 2A of the Foothill Extension, was built by the Foothill Gold Line Construction Authority (Foothill Gold Line).

== Future developments ==
=== Foothill Extension Phase 2B to Claremont ===
The second part of the Foothill Extension Phase 2B project will further extend the A Line east to the Claremont San Bernardino Line station. Construction is expected to break ground in 2027 and be completed in 2031.

=== Southeast Gateway Line ===
The Southeast Gateway Line is a planned light rail line, mostly following the Pacific Electric's historic West Santa Ana Branch, connecting Downtown Los Angeles to the city of Artesia, along with other cities in southeastern Los Angeles County. It will link the southeast/Gateway cities with the A Line at Slauson station. Construction is planned to begin in 2025 with service starting in 2035. Metro estimates it will take 10 years to build.

== Current issues ==
=== Capacity limits ===
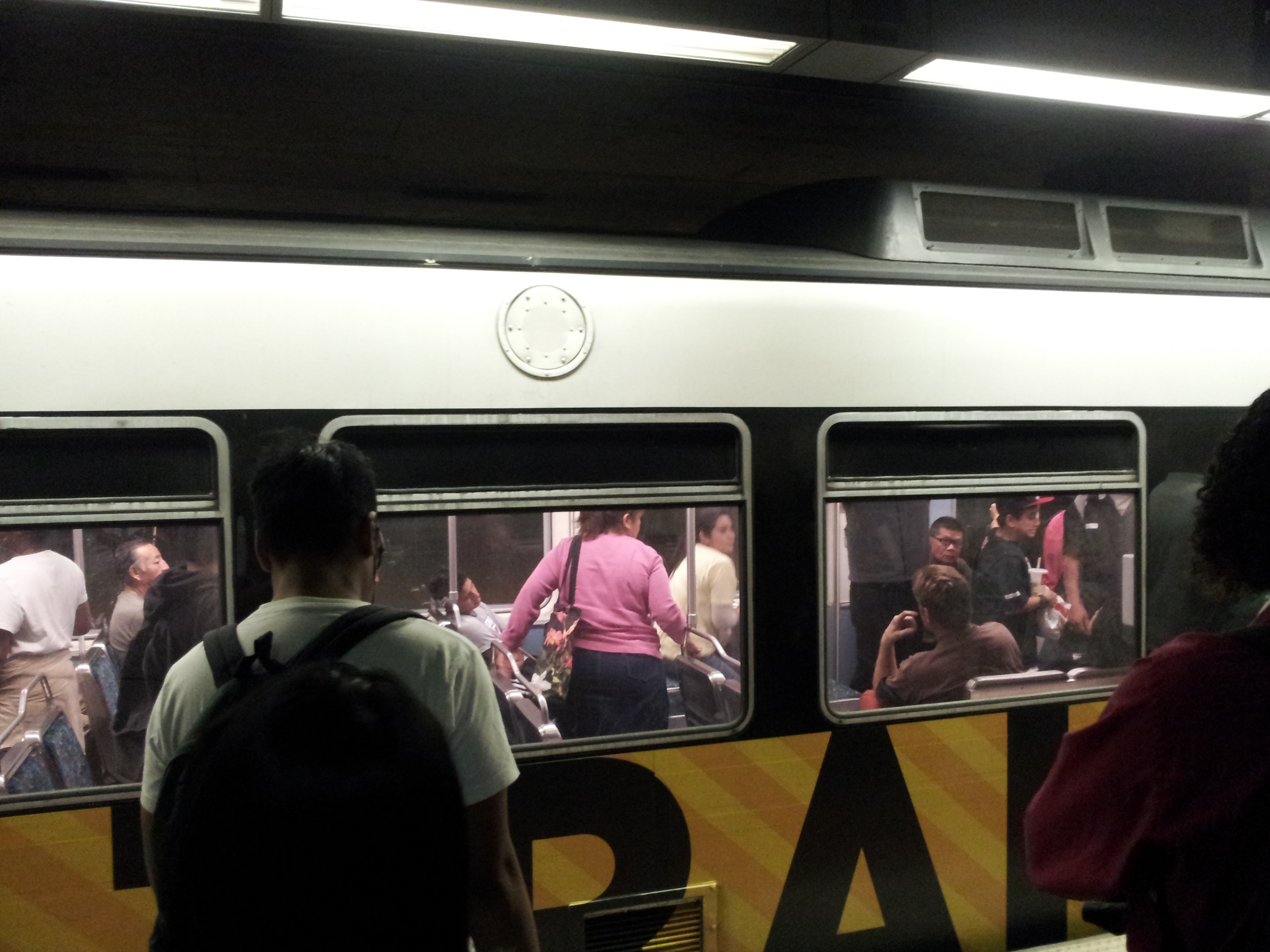
A Line train arriving at 7th Street/Metro Center.

The A Line often operates at capacity, and various options to increase capacity have been considered, such as four-car or more frequent trains. Both have problems: it would be difficult or impossible to lengthen some of the station platforms, and the number of trains already causes delays for other vehicles at level crossings. Since the opening of the Regional Connector, ridership on the A Line continues to increase, potentially resulting in even more capacity problems.

One of the biggest constraints on the capacity of the A and E lines is the at-grade section along Flower Street in Downtown Los Angeles, especially Pico Station and the wye junction at Flower and Washington. Pico Station serves both lines and cannot be bypassed, so service on both lines is limited by the capacity of the station and the grade crossing of Pico Boulevard immediately adjacent to it. The wye junction at Flower and Washington is a similar bottleneck, as trains on both lines must cross a busy intersection and freeway onramp at-grade. Accidents, gridlocked traffic, and signal delays at the junction can cause cascading service disruptions across both lines. Various grade separation projects have been considered to improve capacity and resolve the issues with this section of track.

=== Safety at level crossings ===
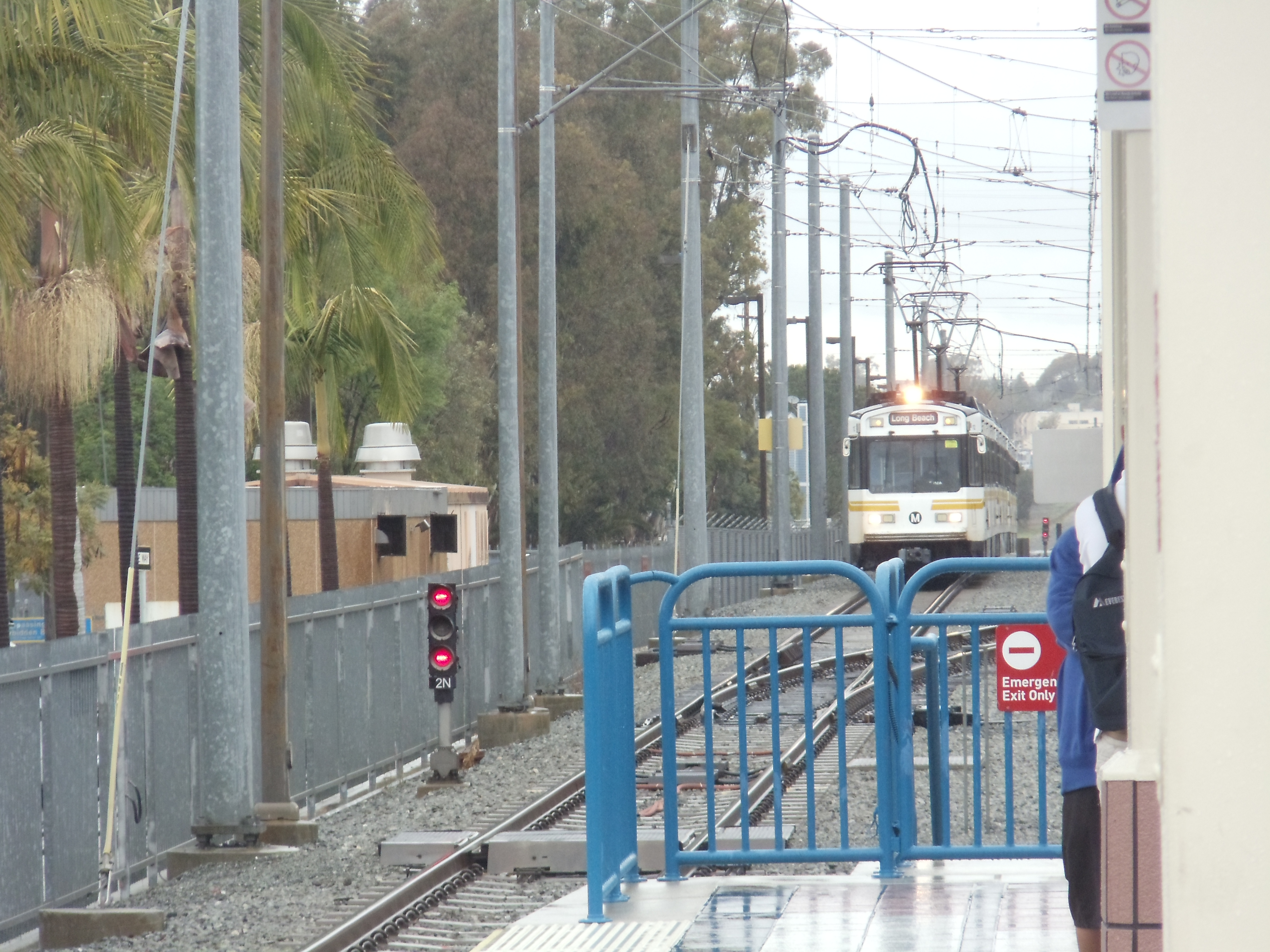
A southbound A Line train arriving at Willow station.

Over 120 motorists and pedestrians have been killed at A Line level crossings since 1990. There have been more than 800 collisions, making the line easily the country's deadliest and most collision-prone rail line.

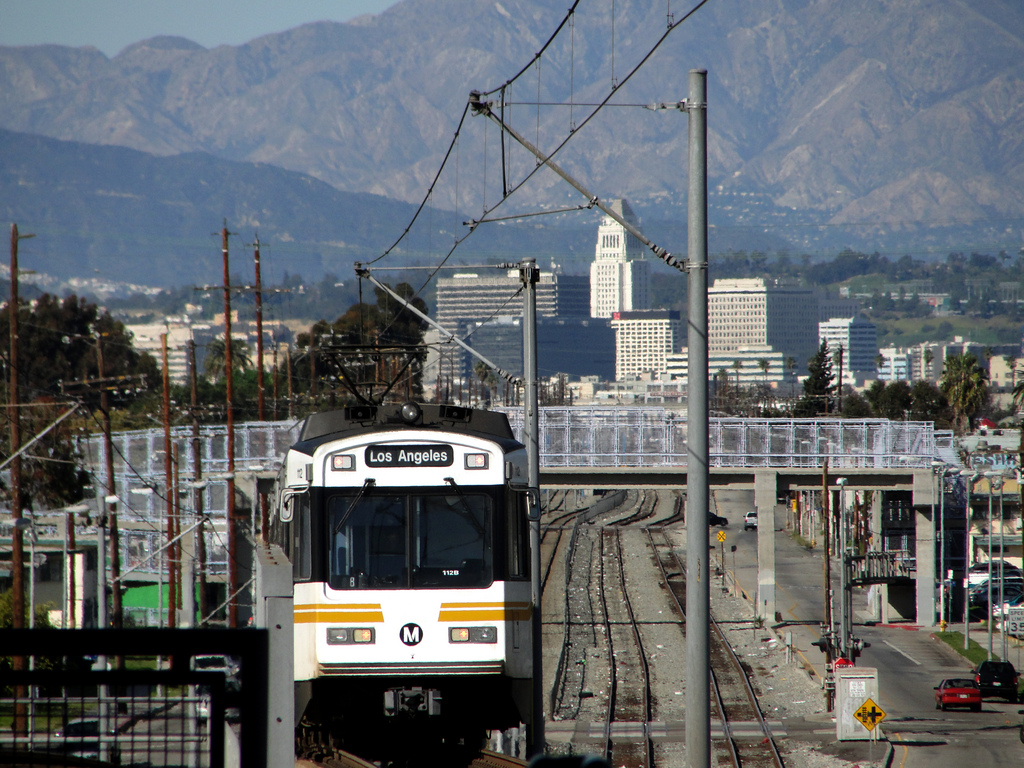
A Line train at Slauson station

In 1998, the MTA commissioned Booz Allen Hamilton, Inc. to evaluate the cause of Blue Line collisions and recommend affordable solutions. The study reported the high ridership (over 70,000 per day) was a contributor:

The MBL has one of the highest ridership counts for light rail lines in the Country. This factor is perhaps the most important contributor to the grade-crossing accident rate. The high ridership results in increased pedestrian traffic near stations compared to other light rail systems. In addition, although MTA Operations does not allow high passenger loads to dictate safe operations, there is pressure to maintain travel times and headway schedule requirements (e.g., a passenger trip from Los Angeles to Long Beach in less than one hour).

Other contributing factors identified were the high population density leading to more pedestrian and vehicular traffic around the tracks, the diverse, varied socio-economic community around the line that creates literacy and language difficulties for public education campaigns, driver frustration due to the slow traffic speeds around the line that leads to more risk-taking behavior, and the shared right of way with freight traffic in the fastest running section from Washington station to Willow station, where trains operate at a maximum of 55 mph (89 km/h) between stations.

Due to this, Metro started in the early 2000s to install four-quadrant gates at crossings where the A Line shares the right of way with freight rail between Willowbrook station and Artesia station. The gates prevent drivers from going around lowered gates. Metro also improved the safety of the A Line's pedestrian crossings by 2018.

== Operations ==
On Metro Rail's internal timetables, the A Line is called line 801.

Because of the length of the line, operators do not take trains from end to end, swapping out at Union Station. Trains are operated between Pomona and Union Station by employees based at Division 24 in Monrovia. Between Long Beach and Union Station, operators are based out of Division 11 in Rancho Dominguez.

=== Maintenance facilities ===
The A Line is operated out of two divisions, Metro's term for train maintenance and storage facilities.

Division 11 is located at 4350 East 208th Street in Cota, North Long Beach between Del Amo and Wardlow stations. The facility can house and maintain 86 light rail vehicles and can perform heavy maintenance including repainting. Trains get to this yard via a wye junction on the southbound tracks. Northbound trains can enter and exit the yard via the cross tracks on the north and south sides of the junction.

Division 24 is located south of the I-210 freeway in Monrovia between Monrovia and Duarte/City of Hope stations. Just like Division 11, trains access the yard via the westbound/southbound tracks from either direction of its wye junction. Crossovers from the eastbound track to the yard junction are located near the California Avenue and Mountain Avenue railroad crossings.

=== Rolling stock ===
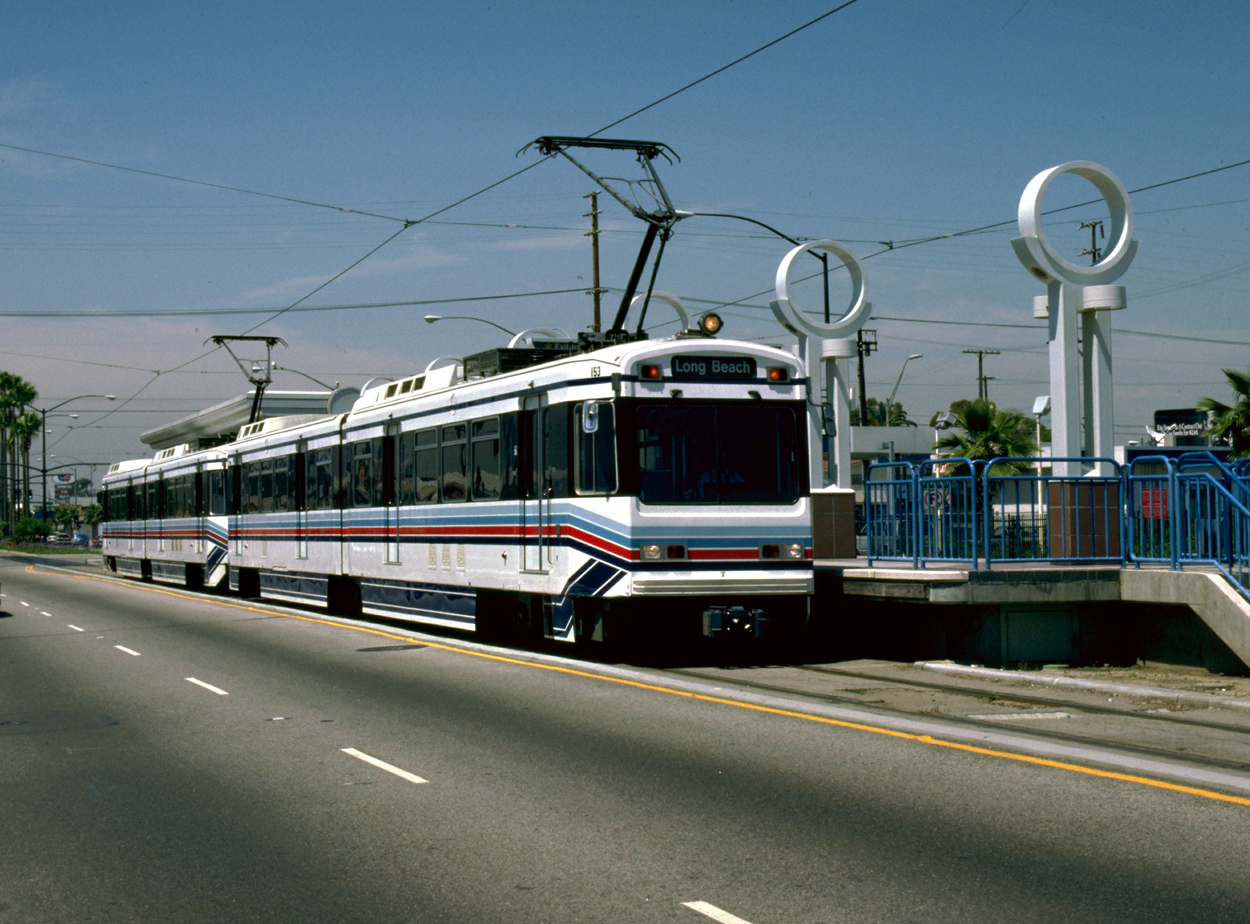
Blue Line train in the 1990s

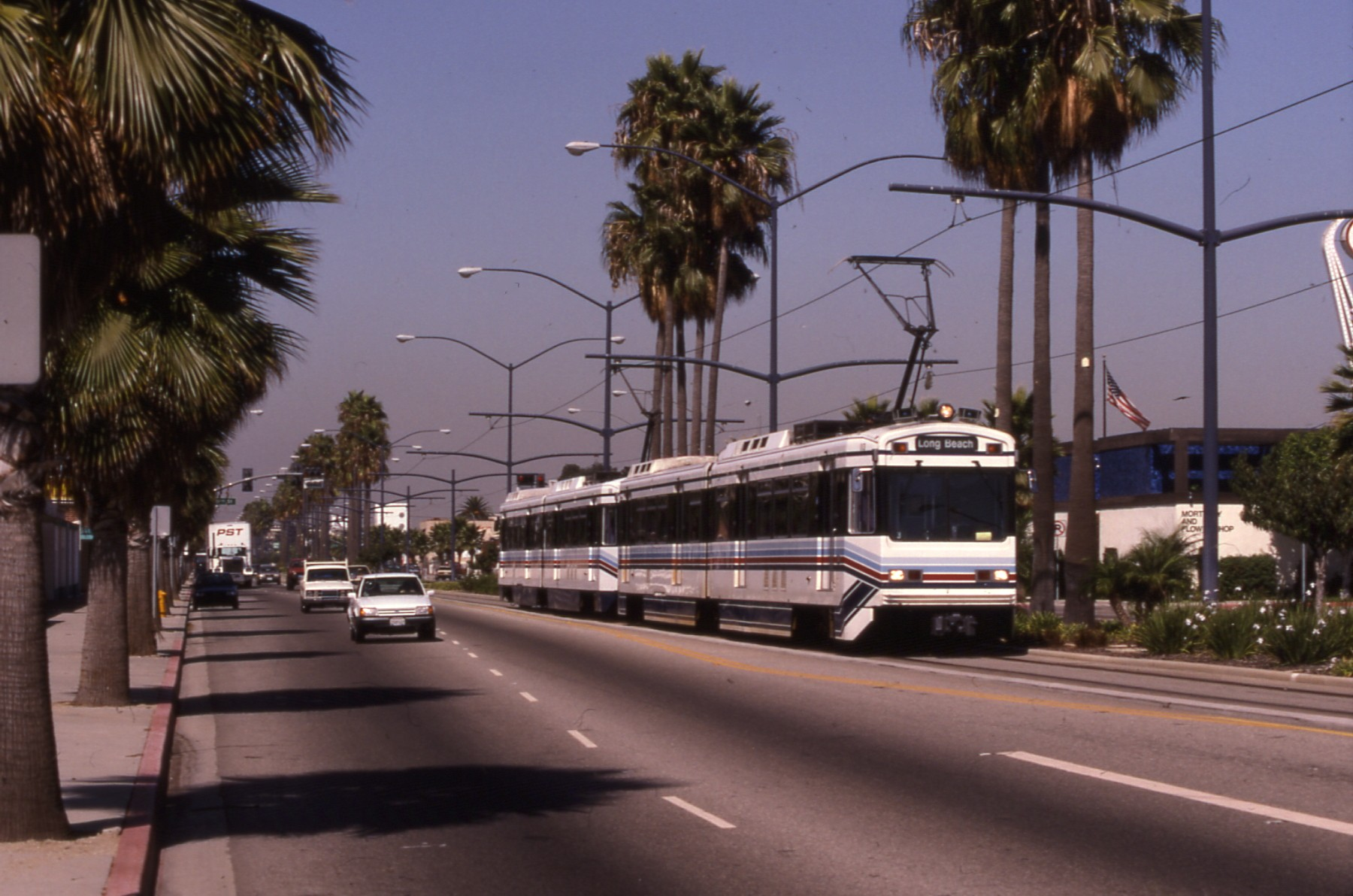
Blue Line train at Long Beach Blvd. and 20th St., 1995

The A Line operates trains with three light rail vehicles on weekdays and two on weekends. The line currently uses three different types of light rail vehicles: the Kinki Sharyo P3010, the Siemens P2000, and the AnsaldoBreda P2550, but has seen every type of light rail rolling stock on Metro's roster throughout its history of operation.

When the A Line, then known as the Blue Line, first opened in 1990, the line had 54 Nippon Sharyo P865 light rail vehicles, numbered 100–153. These cars wore a unique livery of several blue stripes and a single red stripe, reflecting the Blue Line's color designation and its Pacific Electric Red Car heritage.

In 2000, Metro transferred all 15 Nippon Sharyo P2020 (numbered 154-168) light rail vehicles from the Green Line (now the C Line) to the Blue Line fleet. These light rail vehicles were nearly identical to the older P865 model but were about five years newer and originally had equipment for automatic train operation.

In 2012, Metro transferred some Siemens P2000 light rail vehicles from the Gold Line to the A (then Blue) Line fleet. These vehicles were used before their refurbishment. As of 2023, some are currently being tested on the A Line, and they made a rocky return to the A Line in late 2024.

In 2017, the Blue Line received 78 Kinki Sharyo P3010 light rail vehicles, the first new cars for the line since it opened in 1990. As the P3010 fleet was introduced, Metro gradually retired all of the remaining P865 light rail vehicles, followed by the P2020 fleet.

In 2023, the AnsaldoBreda P2550 light rail vehicles began service on the A Line. The P2550 trains were tested on the Blue Line in 2009, but were instead assigned to the Gold Line due to weight restrictions.
