= Northeast Los Angeles =

District in Los Angeles, California, United States

Coordinates: 34.1178°N 118.2160°W

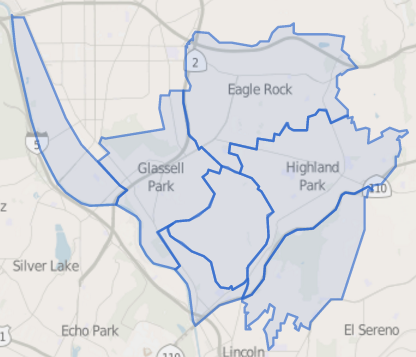
Northeast Los Angeles as mapped by the Los Angeles Times.

Northeast Los Angeles (abbreviated NELA) is a 17.18 mi^{2} (44.5 km^{2}) region of Los Angeles County, comprising seven neighborhoods within Los Angeles. The area is home to Occidental College located in Eagle Rock.

== History ==
The bulk of the area closer to Pueblo de Los Angeles-Downtown Los Angeles was part of the original Spanish and Mexican land grants of Rancho San Rafael and Rancho San Pascual when the city incorporated in 1850. One of the first annexations of the city was Highland Park in 1895. Other nearby communities attached to Los Angeles were Garvanza (1899), Arroyo Seco (1912) and Eagle Rock (1923). Development in the Northeast was fostered by service of the Los Angeles Railway "Yellow Cars."

Traditionally a heavily Latino and working-class part of the city, Northeast Los Angeles has undergone gentrification starting in the 2000s. With the influx of young professionals, Northeast Los Angeles has gained attention for its hipster culture and a new wave of commercial development; however, increasing housing prices have caused tensions with long-time residents.

== Geography ==
According to the Mapping L.A. survey of the Los Angeles Times, Northeast Los Angeles consists of a 17.18 mi^{2} (44.5 km^{2}) region bounded on the south and west by the Interstate 5, the north by the cities of Glendale and Pasadena, and bounded on the east by the Arroyo Seco Parkway. Much of Northeast Los Angeles is located on or around the San Rafael Hills.

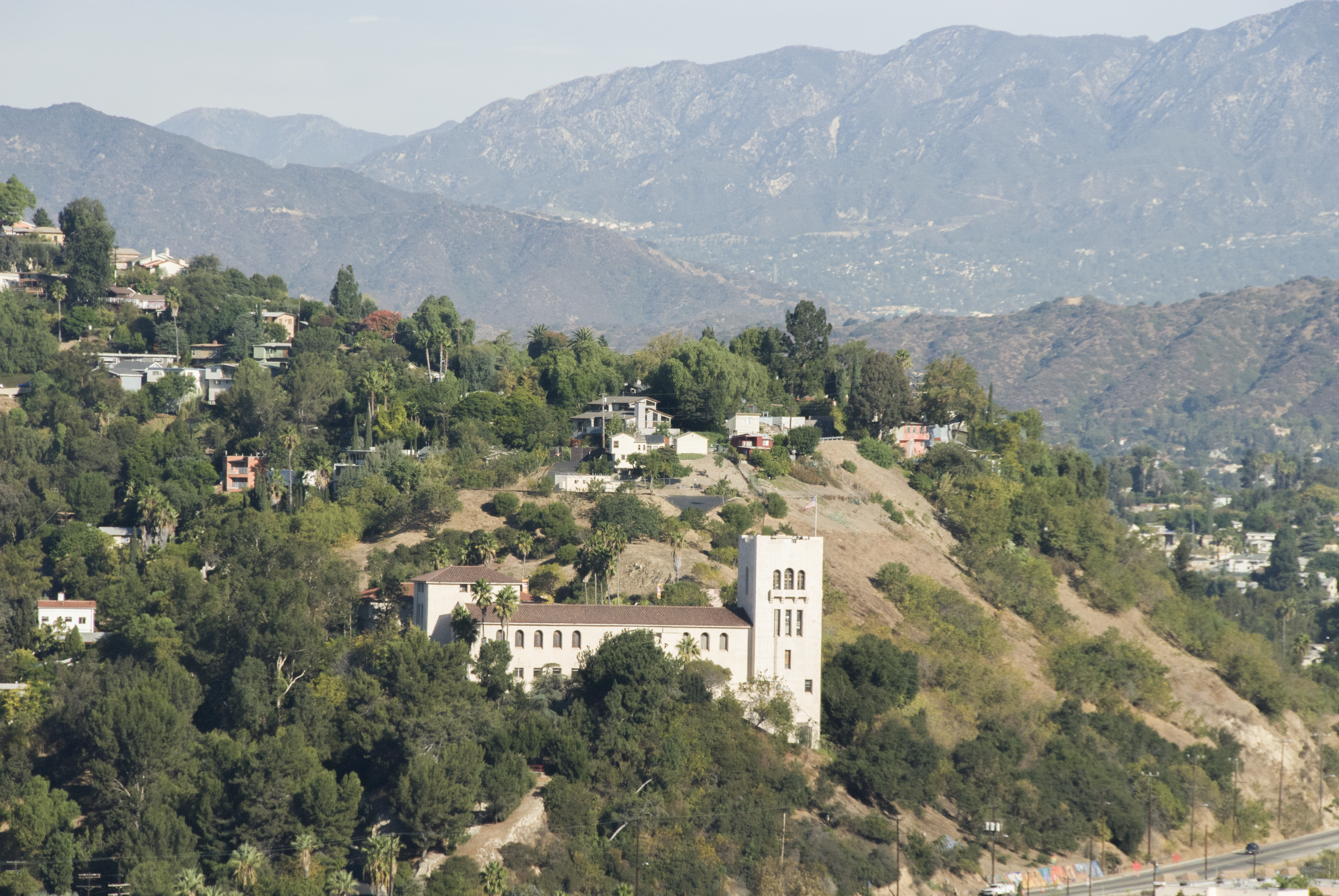
Southwest Museum of the American Indian.

The same survey identifies the following seven neighborhoods as comprising Northeast Los Angeles:

- Atwater Village
- Cypress Park
- Eagle Rock
- Montecito Heights
- Glassell Park
- Highland Park
- Mount Washington

Other neighborhoods within the region are:

- Arroyo Seco
- Elysian Valley
- Garvanza
- Heritage Square
- Hermon
- Monterey Hills

== Population ==
=== 2017 City of Los Angeles data ===
According to the 2013-2017 American Community Survey and the City of Los Angeles Department of City Planning, Northeast Los Angeles had 243,925 residents. The racial and ethnic breakdown was Latino, 64%, White, 16.7%, Asian, 16.5%; Black, 1.8%, Native American 0.5%, Pacific Islander 0.4%, and Other, 0.8%.

The area has a relatively large immigrant community, with approximately 38% of the population being foreign-born.

=== 2000 census ===
In the 2000 census, Northeast Los Angeles had 167,674 residents in its 17.18 square miles, which amounted to 9,757 people per square mile. The densest neighborhood was Highland Park, and the least dense was Mount Washington.

About 54% of the area's population lived in rental units, while 46% lived in owner-occupied housing. Highland Park was the neighborhood with the highest rental occupancy, and Eagle Rock had the lowest. The latter district also had the oldest population, and Cypress Park had the youngest. Eagle Rock also was the wealthiest neighborhood and Cypress Park the poorest. Eagle Rock was the neighborhood with the largest percentage of residents holding a four-year academic degree and Cypress Park had the lowest percentage.

The ethnic breakdown in 2000 was Latino, 62.5%, White, 16.6%, Asian, 16.0%; Black, 2.0%, and Other, 2.9%. Eagle Rock was the most ethnically diverse neighborhood and Cypress Park the least.

== Transportation ==
The area is well-served by freeways and public transportation. California's first freeway, the 1940 Arroyo Seco Parkway (SR 110), connects the area with Downtown and Pasadena. Interstate 5 (the Golden State Freeway) and Interstate 10 (the San Bernardino Freeway) lie directly to the south of the district.

The Metro A Line light rail's four stations (Lincoln/Cypress, Heritage Square, Southwest Museum, and Highland Park) connect Northeast Los Angeles with Downtown and Pasadena.

Metro's North Hollywood to Pasadena Bus Rapid Transit Project line will serve Eagle Rock, with stations planned at Eagle Rock Plaza, Colorado/Eagle Rock and Colorado/Townsend.

== See also ==
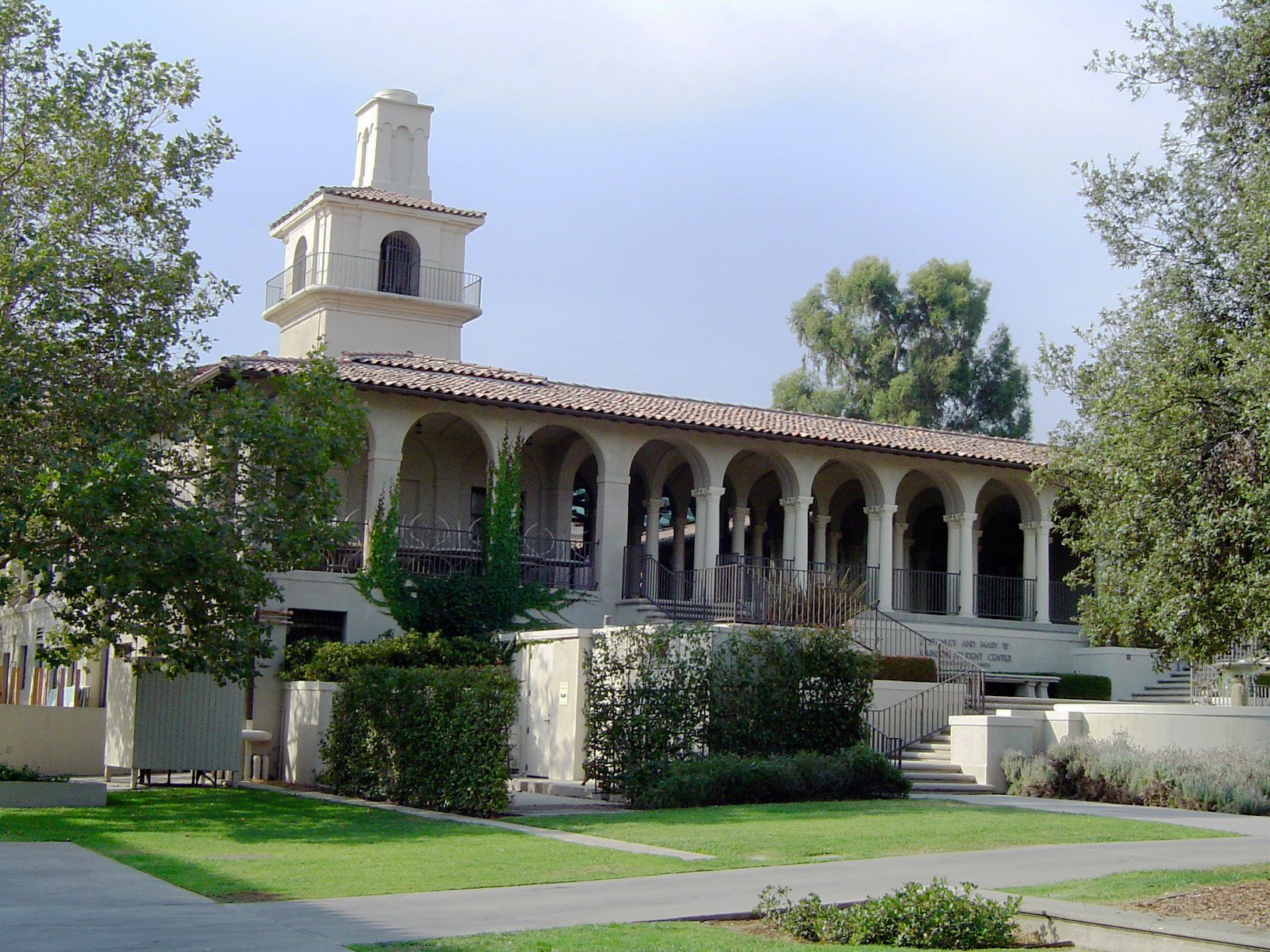
Johnson Student Center and Freeman College Union at Occidental College.

=== Notable places ===
- Arroyo Seco River
- California Cycleway
- Occidental College
- Southwest Museum of the American Indian
- Heritage Square Museum
- List of Los Angeles Historic-Cultural Monuments on the East and Northeast Sides

=== Notable people ===
- John C. Holland, Los Angeles City Council member, 1943–67, businessman in Northeast Los Angeles
- Jackson Browne, singer, songwriter, and musician who wrote and recorded songs such as "These Days", "The Pretender", "Running on Empty".
- Skrillex (Sonny Moore), electronic music/songwriter, 1988–present
- Beck (Beck Hansen), alternative singer/musician
- Billie Eilish, Academy Award & Grammy Award winning singer/songwriter.
- Edward Furlong actor, "Terminator 2: Judgment Day"

=== Other regions of Los Angeles County ===
- Angeles National Forest
- Antelope Valley
- Central Los Angeles
- Eastside
- Harbor
- Northwest County
- Pomona Valley
- San Fernando Valley
- San Gabriel Valley
- South Bay
- Santa Monica Mountains
- South Los Angeles
- Southeast County
- Verdugos
- Westside
