= Figueroa Street =

Street in Los Angeles County, California

- Figueroa Street sign in Los Angeles
- Namesake: José Figueroa
- Maintained by: Los Angeles County Department of Public Works and local city jurisdictions
- Length: 22.2 mi (35.7 km)
- Location: Los Angeles County, California, United States
- Nearest metro station: : Pacific Coast Hwy; Carson; Rosecrans; Harbor Freeway; Manchester; Slauson; 37th Street/USC; Expo Park/USC; Jefferson/USC; LATTC/Ortho Institute; Grand/LATTC; Pico; 7th St/Metro Center; Grand Ave Arts/Bunker Hill; Lincoln/Cypress; Southwest Museum; Highland Park
- South end: Harry Bridges Boulevard in San Pedro
- Major junctions: SR 1 in Wilmington; SR 110 in Chinatown; Gap in route; San Fernando Road / Riverside Drive in Cypress Park; SR 110 in Cypress Park; SR 134 in Eagle Rock; Gap in route; Marengo Drive in Glendale
- North end: Chevy Chase Drive in La Cañada Flintridge

Figueroa Street is a major north–south street in Los Angeles County, California, spanning from the Los Angeles neighborhood of Wilmington north to Eagle Rock. A short, unconnected continuation of Figueroa Street runs just south of Marengo Drive in Glendale to Chevy Chase Drive in La Cañada Flintridge.

== Route description ==
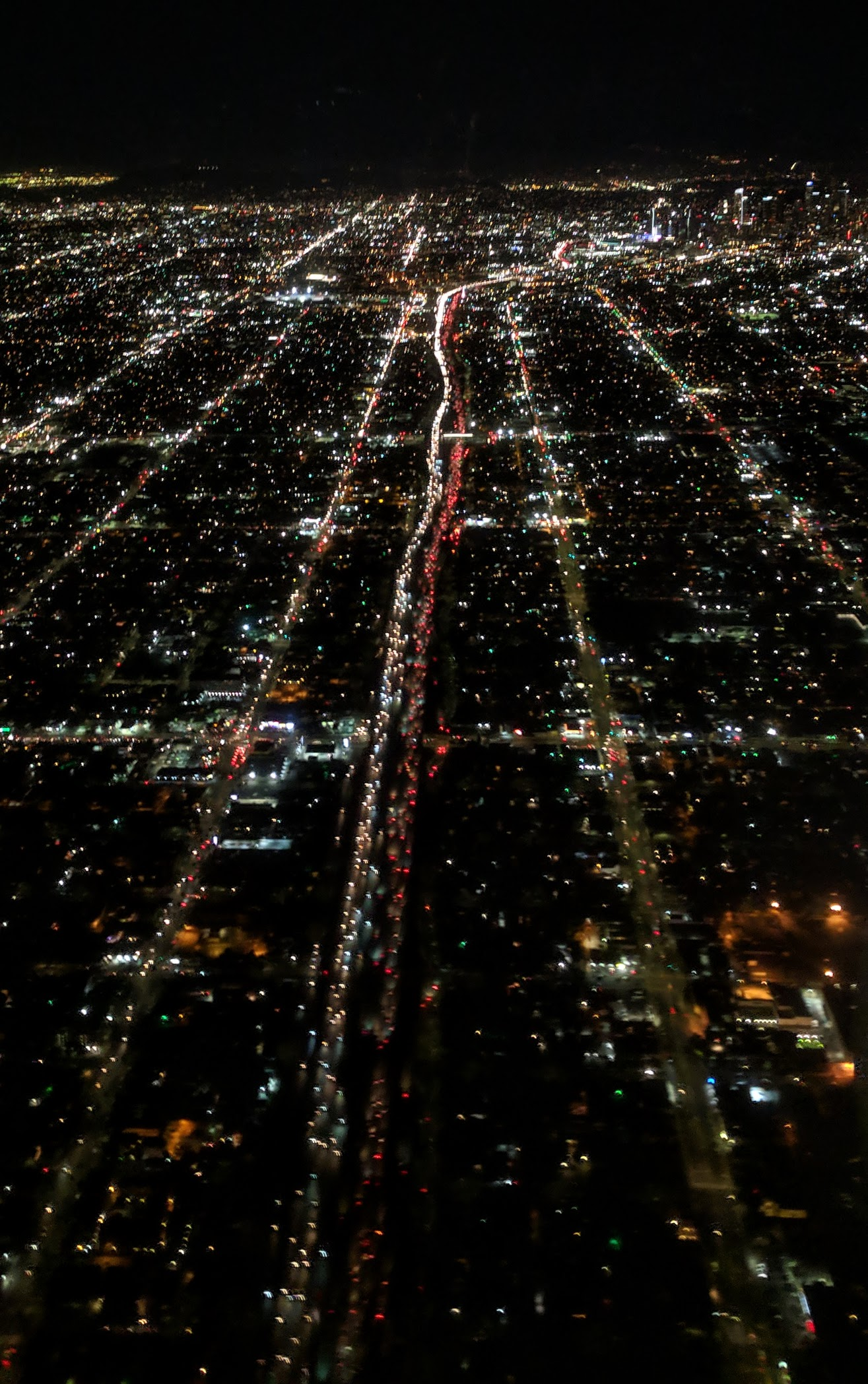
Figueroa Street (left), Harbor Freeway (center), and Broadway (right). Night aerial view, looking north, with downtown Los Angeles in the distance. Figueroa Street turns and become less visible at the University of Southern California.

One of the longer streets in the city, it runs in a north–south direction for more than 30 miles (48 km) from its southern terminus at Harry Bridges Boulevard in the Wilmington neighborhood to Chevy Chase Drive in the city of La Cañada Flintridge at the north end.

From its south end at Harry Bridges Boulevard to downtown Los Angeles, Figueroa Street runs north parallel to the Harbor Freeway (Interstate 110) in South Los Angeles. The only portion of this segment of Figueroa Street that lies outside Los Angeles city limits is in the city of Carson. South of the Los Angeles Financial District, Figueroa Street passes well-known locations including the University of Southern California, the Los Angeles Convention Center, and Crypto.com Arena/L.A. Live.

Between Olympic Boulevard and 3rd Street in downtown Los Angeles, Figueroa Street forms a one-way pair with Flower Street, with northbound traffic staying on Figueroa and southbound traffic diverting to Flower.

After passing through downtown near Bunker Hill and South Park, the southern portion of Figueroa Street ends near the overcrossing of Sunset Boulevard over the Arroyo Seco Parkway (SR 110) in Chinatown. The northern portion of the street resumes at San Fernando Road in Cypress Park. An early routing of Figueroa Street in this area was originally part of U.S. Route 66, today a part of the Arroyo Seco Parkway (State Route 110). The noted Figueroa Street Tunnels were once a part of that same stretch of roadway.

After resuming at San Fernando Road, Figueroa continues to run roughly parallel to the Arroyo Seco Parkway until it reaches York Boulevard in Highland Park. Afterwards, it heads north to its terminus near the Scholl Canyon Landfill just past its junction with the Ventura Freeway (State Route 134) in Eagle Rock. A short, unconnected continuation of Figueroa Street runs from a residential area just south of Marengo Drive in Glendale to end at Chevy Chase Drive just over the city limit line in La Cañada Flintridge.

Early maps produced by the Automobile Club of Southern California measured distances to Los Angeles from the club's headquarters at the intersection of Figueroa Street with Adams Boulevard.

== History ==
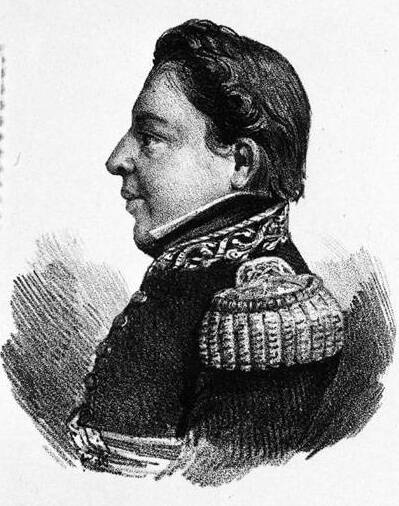
Governor José Figueroa, namesake of the street.

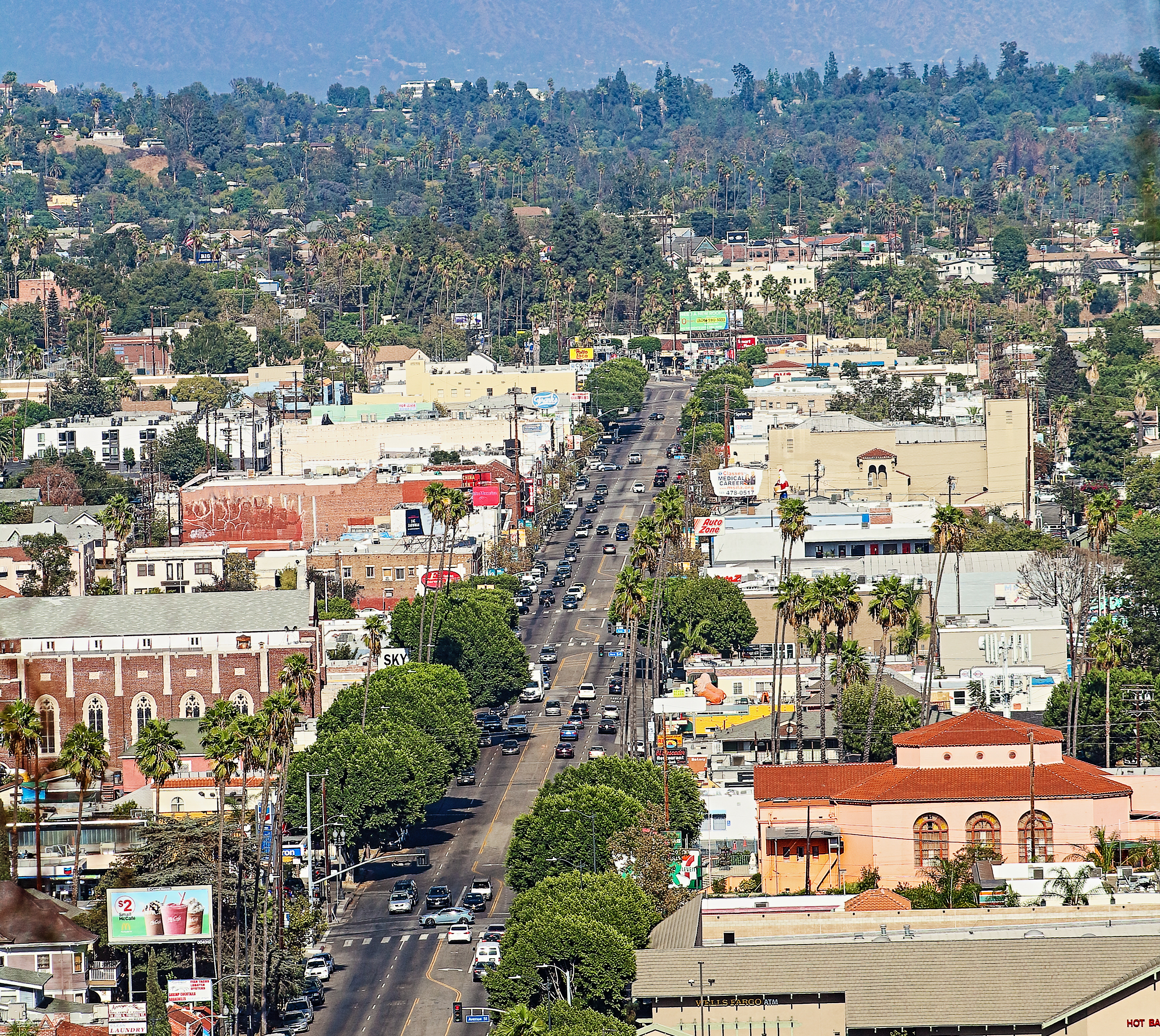
Figueroa Street in Highland Park, Los Angeles

The street is named for General José Figueroa (1792 – September 29, 1835), the Mexican governor of Alta California from 1833 to 1835, who oversaw the secularization of the Spanish missions in California.

Figueroa Street was originally called Calle de los Chapules, which translates to "Street of the Grasshoppers". Chapules is the plural of "chapul", which is not the standard Spanish word for grasshopper (that being "saltamonte"), but rather a word from the Nahuatl of Durango and Nayarit (also known as Mexicanero).

Later in the 1880s it became known as "Pearl Street". Figueroa Street originally was a few blocks west of Pearl but joined Pearl Street further south. Pearl Street was changed to Figueroa and the northern portion of the old Figueroa Street was renamed Boylston. The section of what is now Figueroa in Highland Park above Avenue 39 was known as "Pasadena Avenue" until Figueroa was extended through Elysian Park. The portion of what is now Figueroa between the Los Angeles River and Avenue 39 was originally known as Dayton Avenue until the Arroyo Parkway went through.

Prior to construction of the Harbor Freeway, Figueroa St. carried U.S. Route 6 to Pacific Coast Highway south from the Four-Level Interchange.

Until 1977, the Guinness Book of Records deemed Figueroa to be the longest street in the world. At the request of writer Jay Myers, it was supplanted by Yonge Street in Toronto.

On April 2, 2011, a portion of Figueroa Street at Jefferson Boulevard was blocked off for the "Orange Carpet" and the grandstand for the broadcasting of the 2011 Kids' Choice Awards.

In South Los Angeles, Figueroa Street has the highest number of prostitution-related arrests in Los Angeles.

The Los Angeles Lakers, the Los Angeles Kings and Los Angeles Rams have used Figueroa as the parade route for their respective championships in 2000, 2001, 2002, 2009 and 2010 for the Lakers, 2012 and 2014 for the Kings and in 2022 for the Rams.

== Future ==
=== Kobe Bryant Boulevard ===
On "Mamba Day", August 24, 2020, then-Los Angeles City Council President Herb Wesson and then council member Curren Price announced plans to rename the 3-mile (4.8 km) segment of Figueroa Street between Olympic Boulevard and Martin Luther King Jr. Boulevard as Kobe Bryant Boulevard. It would be renamed in honor of professional basketball player Kobe Bryant. On October 21, 2020, the vote to consider the proposal was delayed by the council, Wesson is now retired and Price is being investigated by the FBI for corruption. No new voting date has been scheduled by the city council as of January 2025.

=== "My Figueroa" and 2028 Summer Olympics ===
The Figueroa Corridor Streetscape project was a city led effort to beautify and improve the boulevard by adding pedestrian friendly amenities. The beautification project began on 7th street in Downtown Los Angeles, by Crypto.com Arena and extended into Exposition Park by USC. The project began in 2017 and was completed by the end of 2018. It aimed to improve transit and pedestrian access, it added protected bike lanes with physical barriers, a more organized and efficient street by adding better signalization and safety signage, high-visibility crosswalks, transit platforms, more trees, public art and wider sidewalks. The $20 million Figueroa Corridor Streetscape project was funded by a Proposition 1C grant. After delays, work commence in the summer of 2016 and was expected to be completed by March 2017, when the prop 1C grant expired. The Los Angeles 2028 organizing committee plan to use this corridor as a planned "Live Site", an area dedicated as a central pedestrian corridor, linking all of the Downtown LA venues together during the 2028 Olympic & Paralympic Games.

== Major intersections ==
Location	mi	km	Destinations	Notes
Los Angeles			John S. Gibson Boulevard	Continuation beyond Harry Bridges Boulevard
Los Angeles			Harry Bridges Boulevard to I-110	Southern end of Figueroa Street
Los Angeles			SR 1 (Pacific Coast Highway)	
Carson			Sepulveda Boulevard	
Carson			To Main Street / I-405 south	Frontage road; no access to I-405 north
Los Angeles			Rosecrans Avenue	
Los Angeles			El Segundo Boulevard	
Los Angeles			Imperial Highway	
Los Angeles			Century Boulevard	
Los Angeles			Manchester Avenue	Former SR 42
Los Angeles			Florence Avenue	
Los Angeles			Slauson Avenue	
Los Angeles			Martin Luther King Jr. Boulevard	South end of proposed Kobe Bryant Boulevard
Los Angeles			Washington Boulevard	
Los Angeles			Pico Boulevard	
Los Angeles			Olympic Boulevard	North end of proposed Kobe Bryant Boulevard; south end of one-way pair where northbound traffic stays on Figueroa Street, and southbound traffic joins from Flower Street then Olympic Blvd.
Los Angeles			Wilshire Boulevard	
Los Angeles			5th Street to SR 110 (Arroyo Seco Parkway)	
Los Angeles			3rd Street to SR 110 (Arroyo Seco Parkway)	North end of one-way pair where northbound traffic stays on Figueroa St. and southbound traffic diverts to 3rd Street then Flower Street
Los Angeles			Sunset Boulevard / Cesar Chavez Avenue	
Los Angeles			SR 110 north / Alpine Street	
Gap in route
Los Angeles			San Fernando Road / Riverside Drive to I-5 south (Golden State Freeway)	
Los Angeles			SR 110 south (Arroyo Seco Parkway)	
Los Angeles			Avenue 26 to I-5 south (Golden State Freeway) / SR 110 north (Arroyo Seco Parkway)	
Los Angeles			Colorado Boulevard	
Los Angeles			SR 134 (Ventura Freeway)	
Los Angeles			Scholl Canyon Road	Continuation beyond SR 134
Gap in route
Glendale			Marengo Drive	
La Cañada Flintridge			Chevy Chase Drive	North end of Figueroa Street
1.000 mi = 1.609 km; 1.000 km = 0.621 mi

== Transportation ==
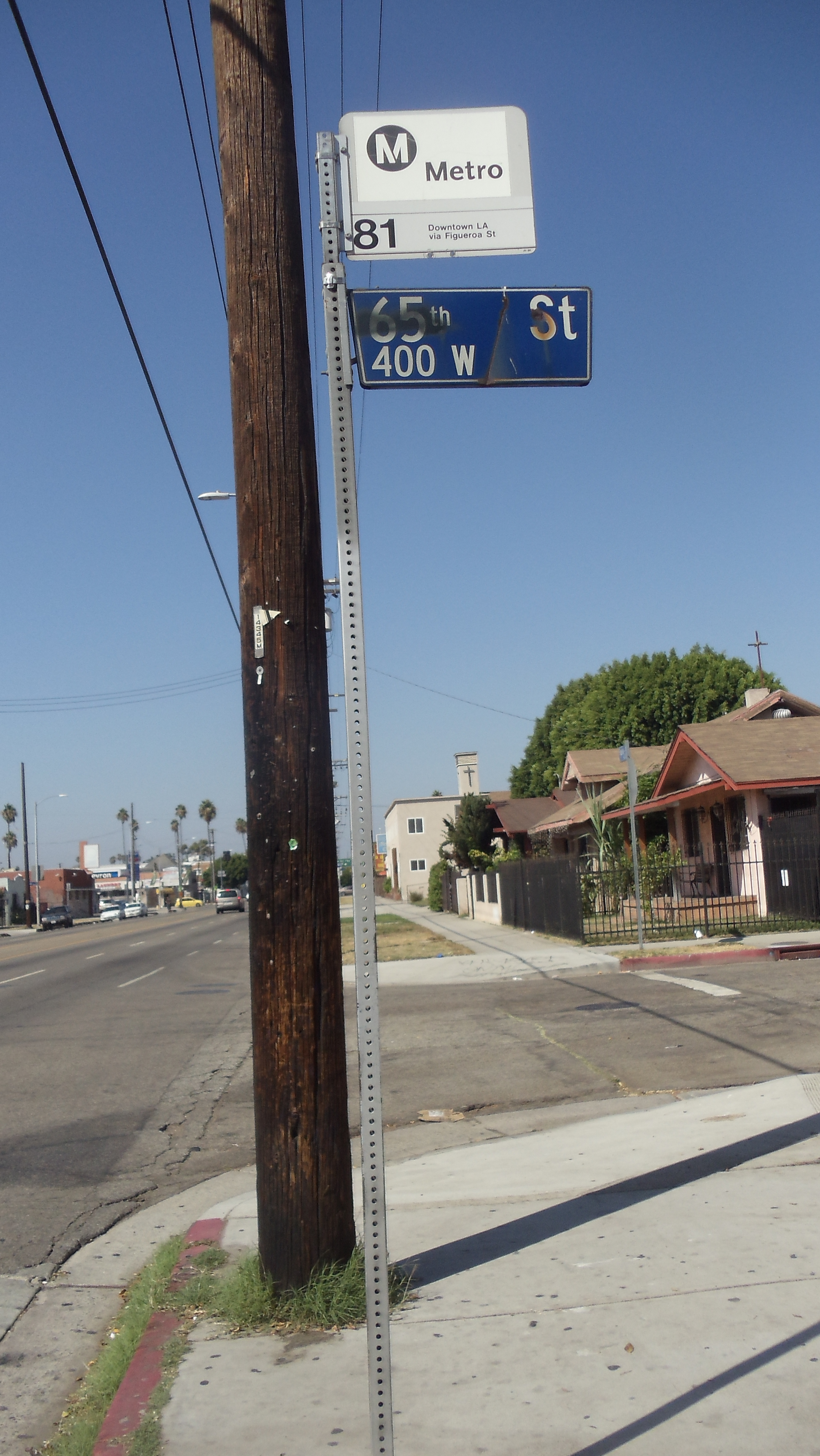
Metro Local Line 81 bus stop at Figueroa and 65th Streets, Los Angeles, California. Metro Local Line 81 runs on Figueroa Street.

The Metro C and J lines operate a station underneath Interstate 105 at Figueroa Street. Metro Local Line 81 operates on Figueroa Street between Colorado Boulevard and Interstate 105 and Torrance Transit Line 1 between Interstate 105 and the Harbor Gateway Transit Center. The Metro E Line has 5 stations nearby. Two of which are shared with the Metro A Line, one being a major hub connecting to the Metro B and D lines. The Metro J Line runs on Figueroa Street in Gardena and between 23rd and 6th Streets in Downtown: Northbound J line trips to El Monte station continue north on Figueroa Street to serve the 7th Street/Metro Center station and finally turn right on 6th street, leaving Figueroa Street. Southbound J Line trips to the Harbor Gateway Transit Center or San Pedro run south on Flower Street from 5th Street to the Harbor Transitway. There are 6 J Line street stops located on Figueroa Street: Figueroa/190th/Victoria; Northbound only: Figueroa/23rd, Figueroa/Washington, Figueroa/Pico, Figueroa/Olympic, and Figueroa/7th . In addition, there are 7 Metro J Line Stations served on the Harbor Transitway and Harbor Freeway close to Figueroa Street: 37th Street/USC, Slauson, Manchester, Harbor Freeway (with C Line connection), Rosecrans, Carson, and Pacific Coast Highway. The Harbor Transitway is located on the I-110 freeway, between Figueroa Street and Broadway. There are also three other Metro A Line stations near Figueroa Street: Lincoln/Cypress (at Avenue 26), Southwest Museum, and Highland Park (at Avenue 57).

== Notable landmarks ==
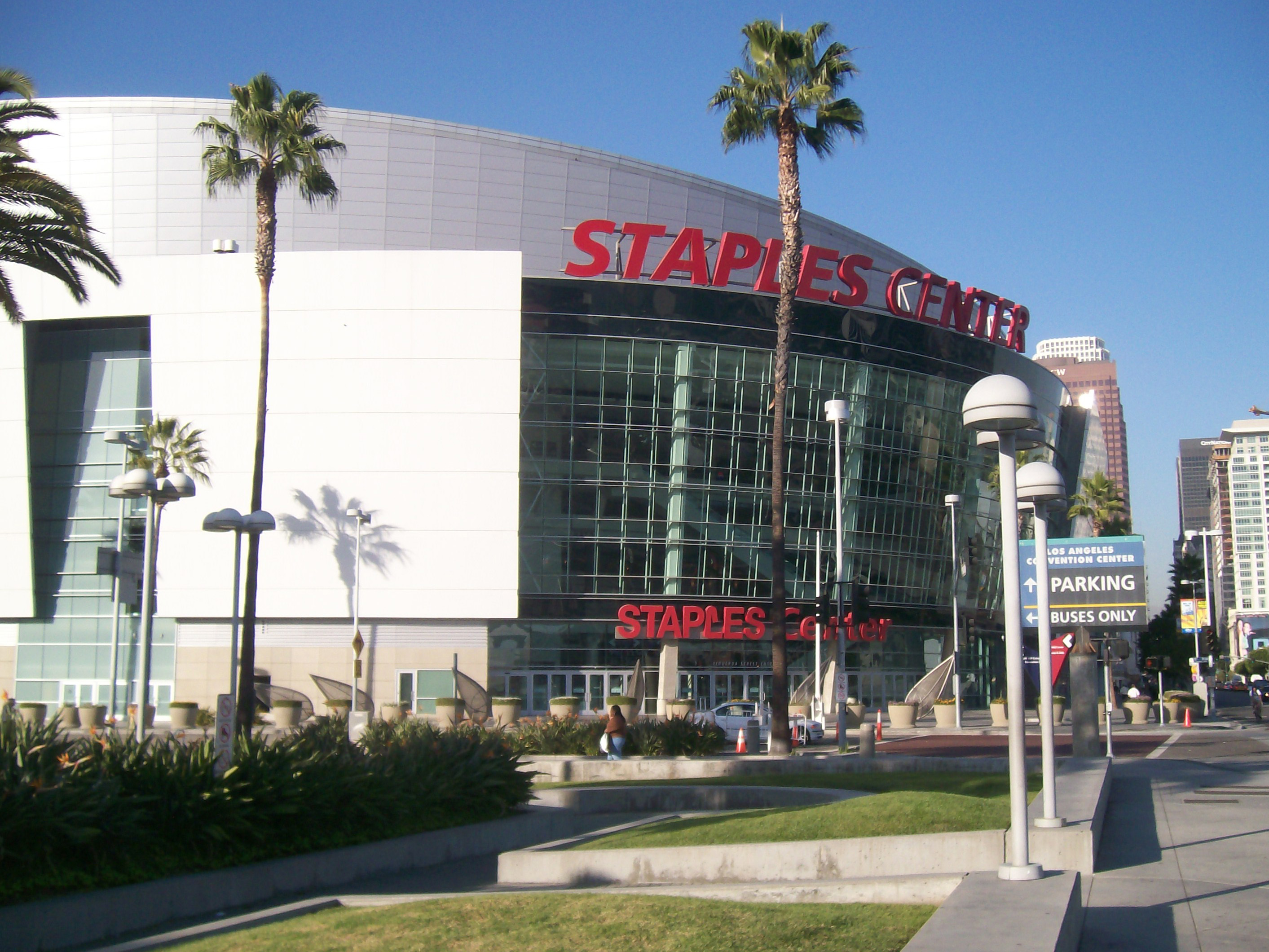
Crypto.com Arena at 12th Street, then known as "Staples Center"

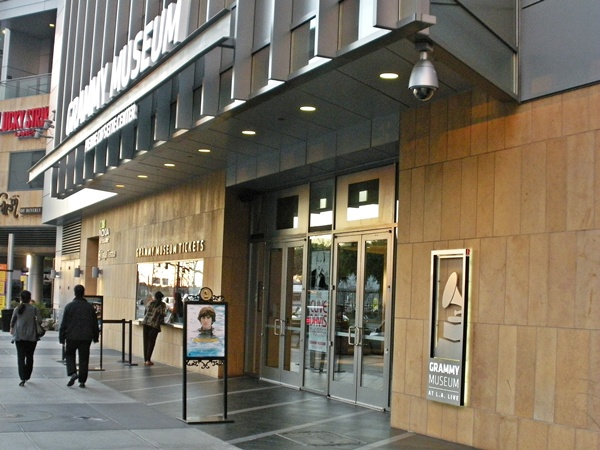
Entrance of Grammy Museum at L.A. Live

- Automobile Club of Southern California
- BMO Stadium
- Bob Hope Patriotic Hall
- Bonaventure Hotel
- Crypto.com Arena
- Eagle Rock Historical Landmark
- Engine Co. 28 (1912 fire station)
- Exposition Park, including an historic palm tree moved there in 1914
- Hotel Figueroa (opened 1926, originally for women only)
- Flower Drive Historic District
- Galen Center
- The Grammy Museum
- Highland Park Adult Senior Citizen Center
- Highland Theatre
- Jonathan Club
- L.A. Live
- Los Angeles Convention Center
- Los Angeles County Health Department
- Los Angeles Memorial Coliseum
- Original Pantry Cafe
- St. Vincent de Paul Church
- Stimson House
- State Bar of California
- University of Southern California
- Variety Arts Center Building
- Wilshire Grand Tower

=== Education ===
- Luther Burbank Middle School
- Florence Nightingale Middle School
- Optimist High School
- Sycamore Grove School
- University of Southern California

== Buildings ==
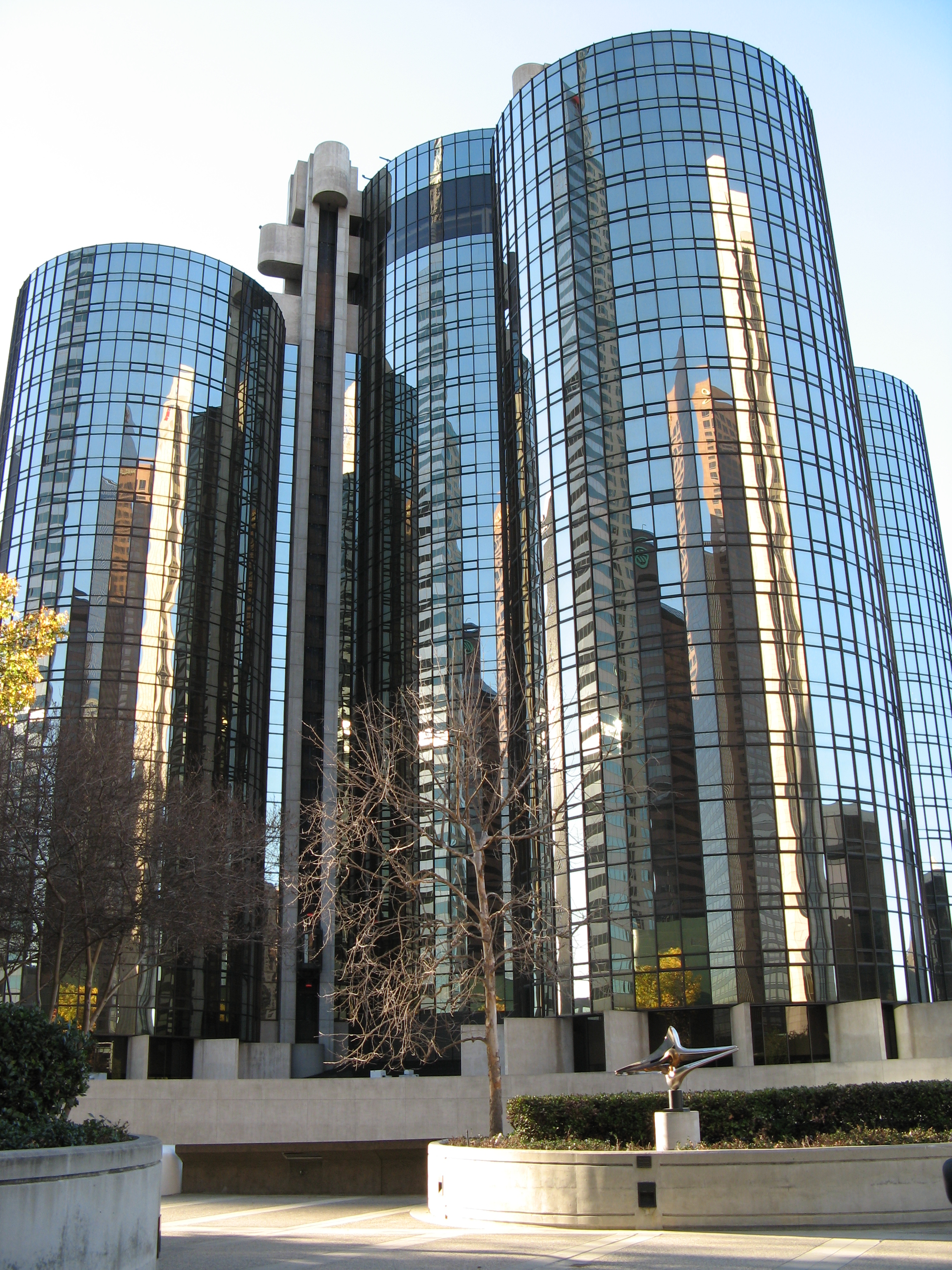
Bonaventure Hotel, 404 South Figueroa

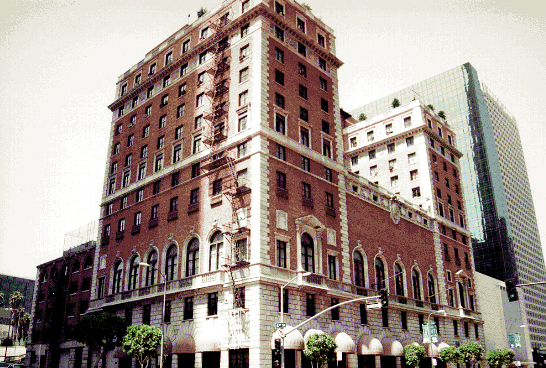
Jonathan Club, 545 South Figueroa

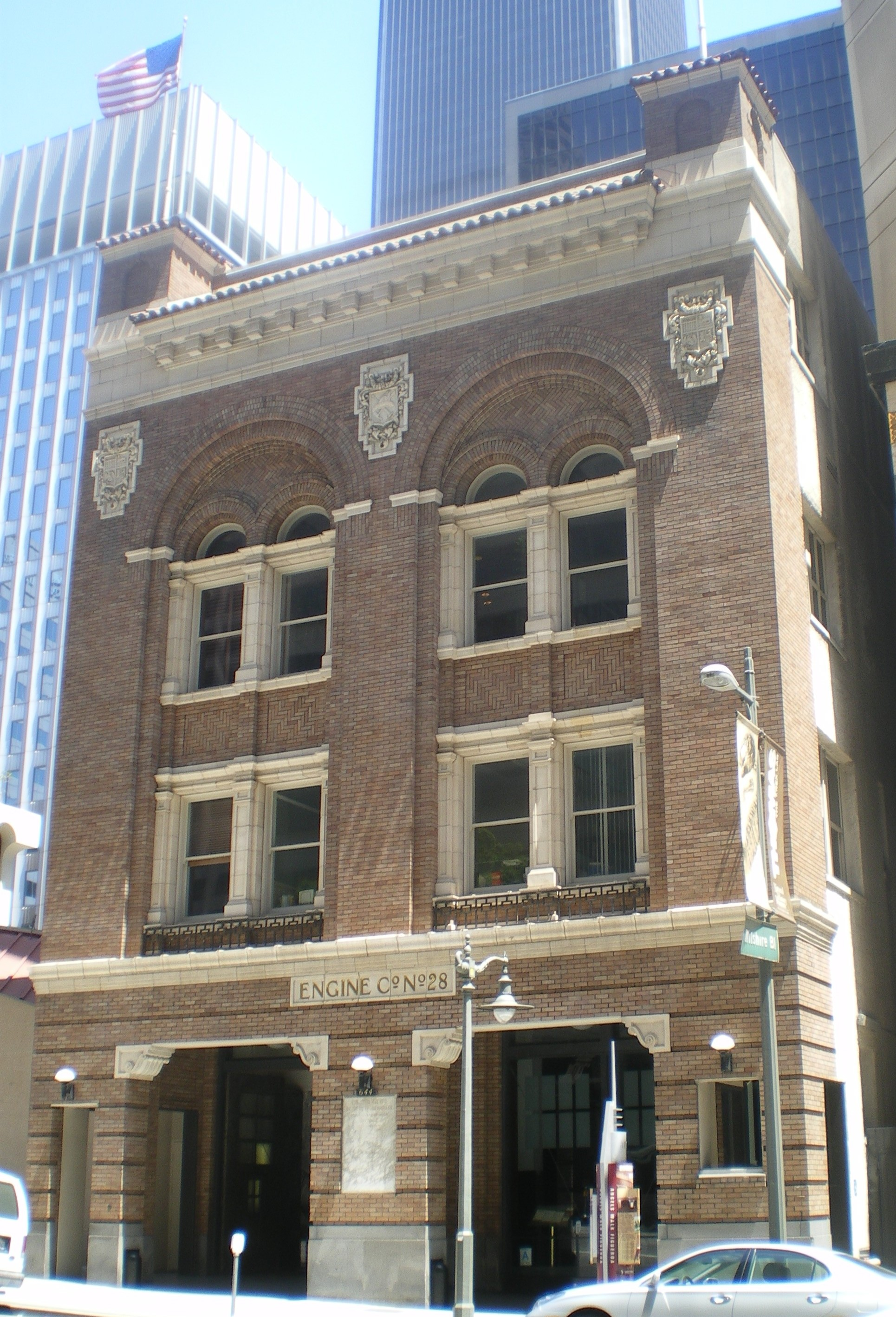
Engine Co. 28, 644 South Figueroa (1912 fire station)

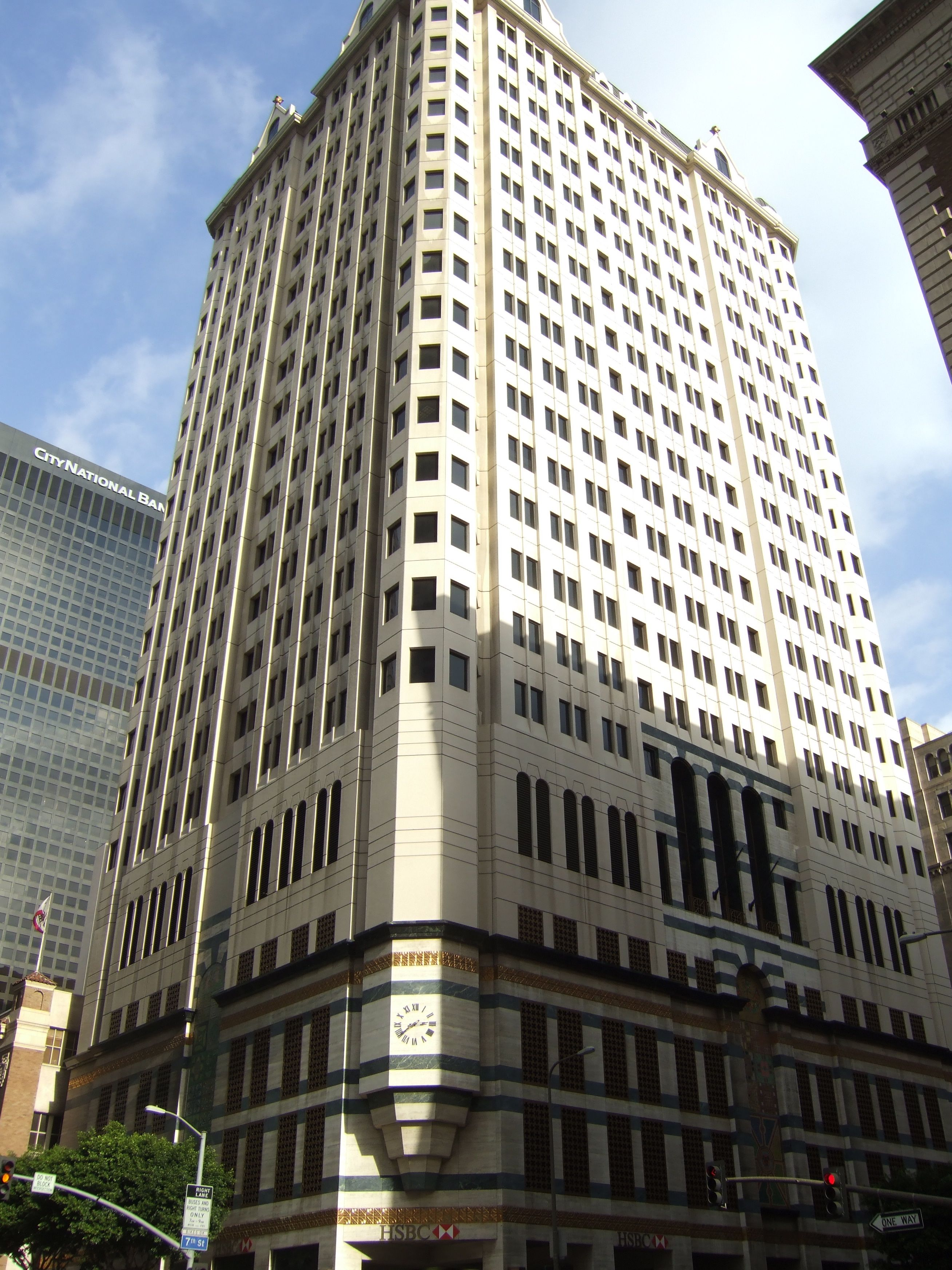
HSBC Building at Seventh Street, 2012

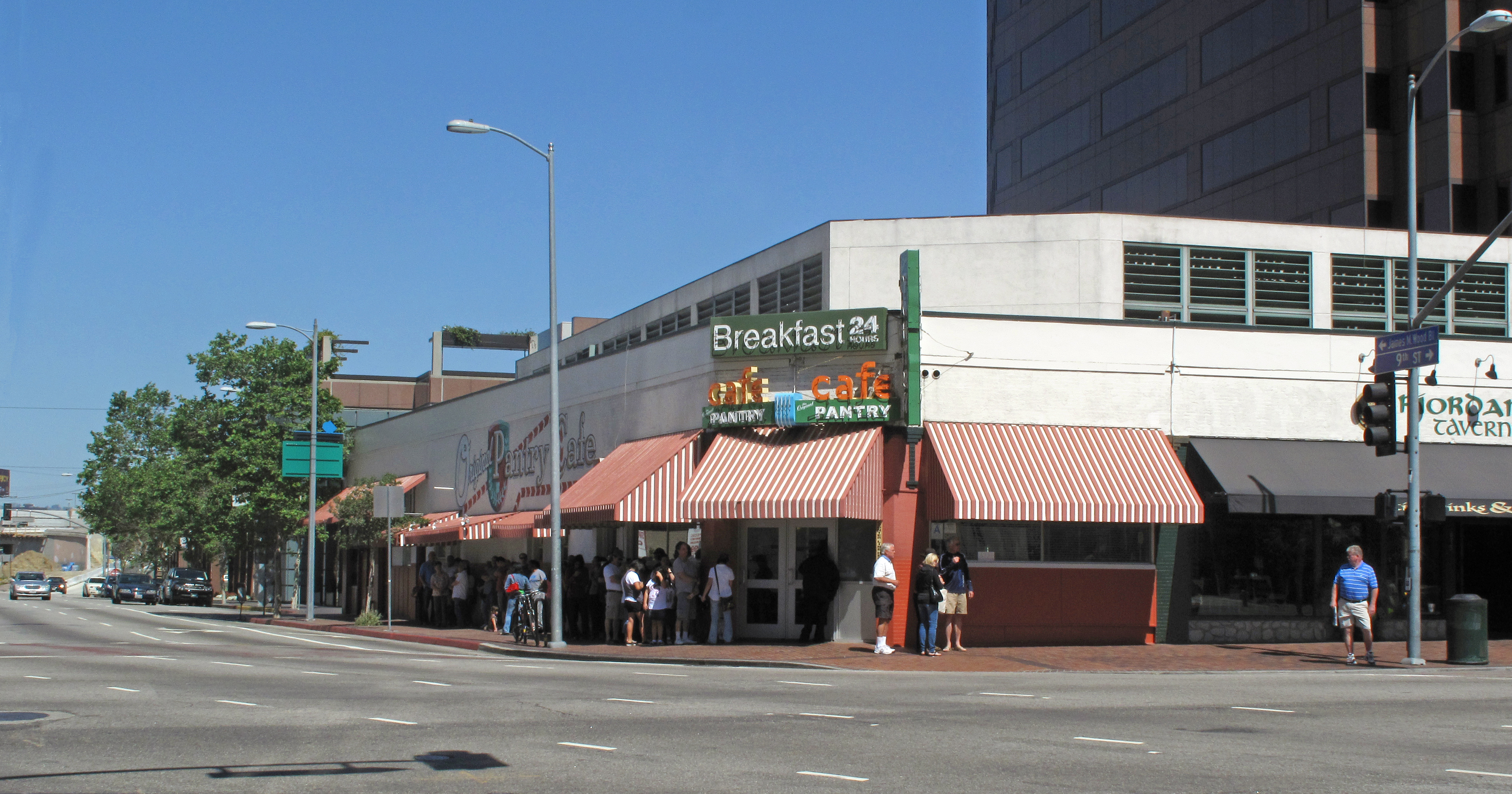
Original Pantry Cafe, 9th Street and Figueroa

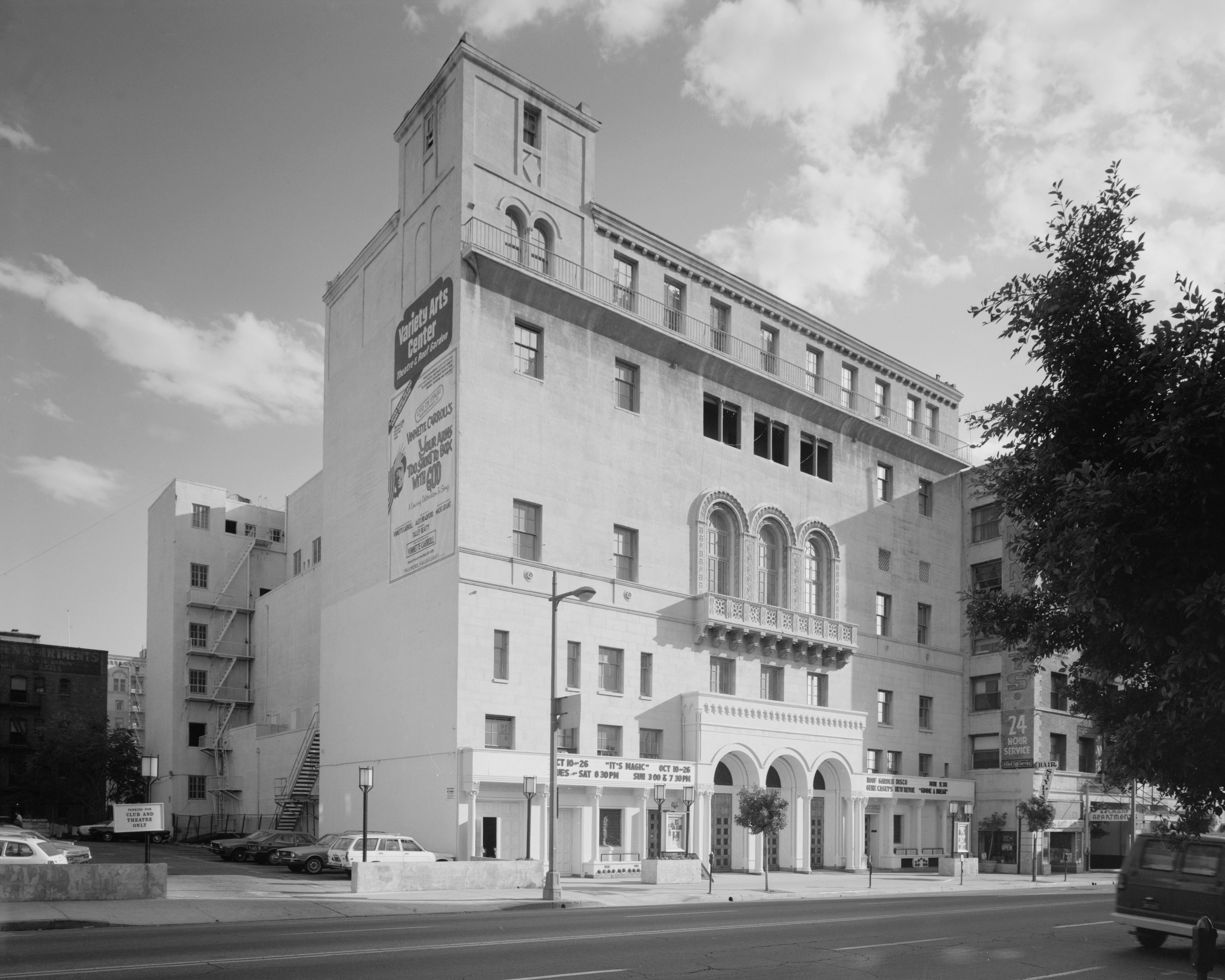
Variety Arts Center Building, 938-940 South Figueroa, 1980, Julius Shulman photo

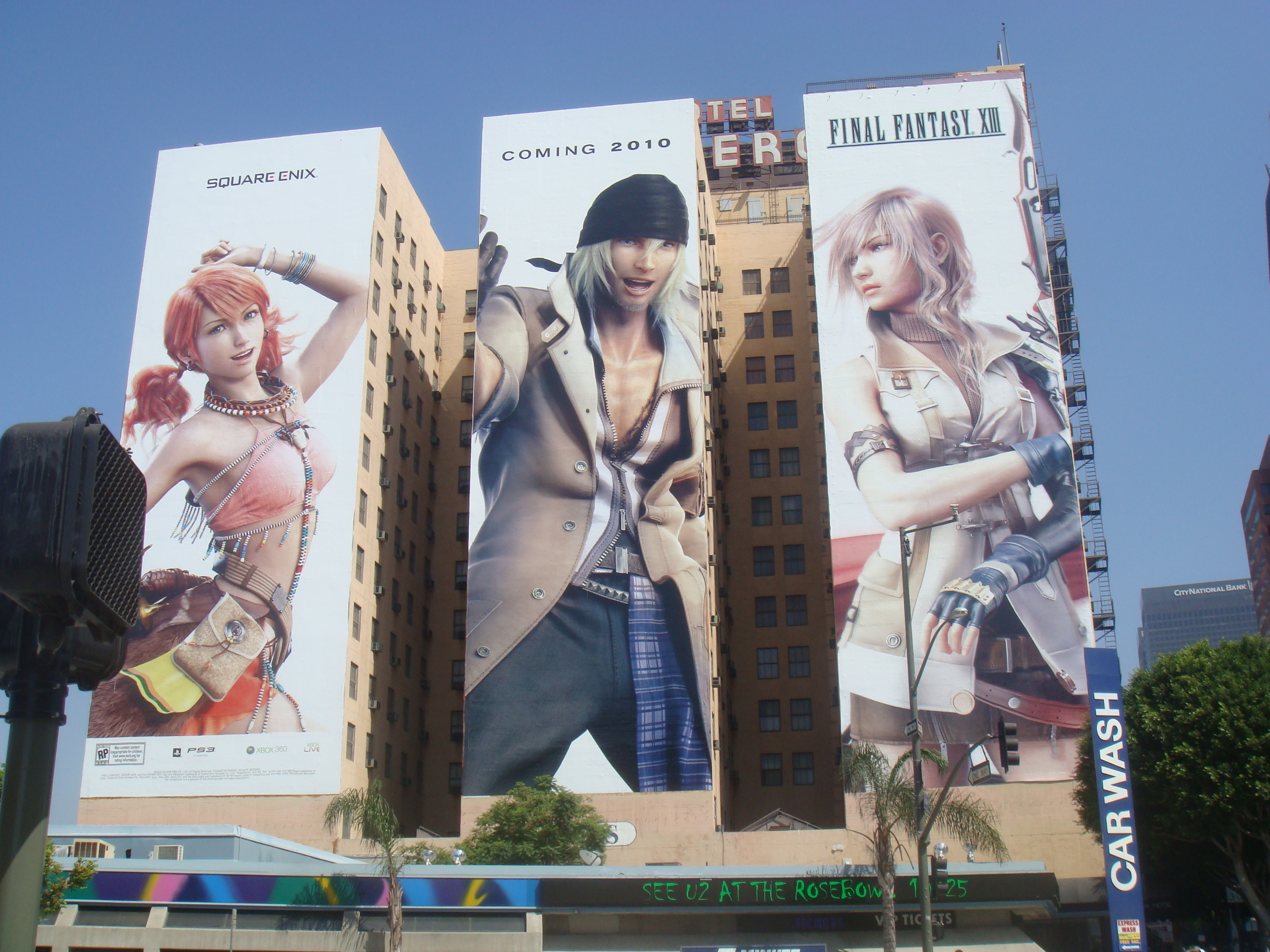
Hotel Figueroa, 939 South Figueroa (photo 2009)

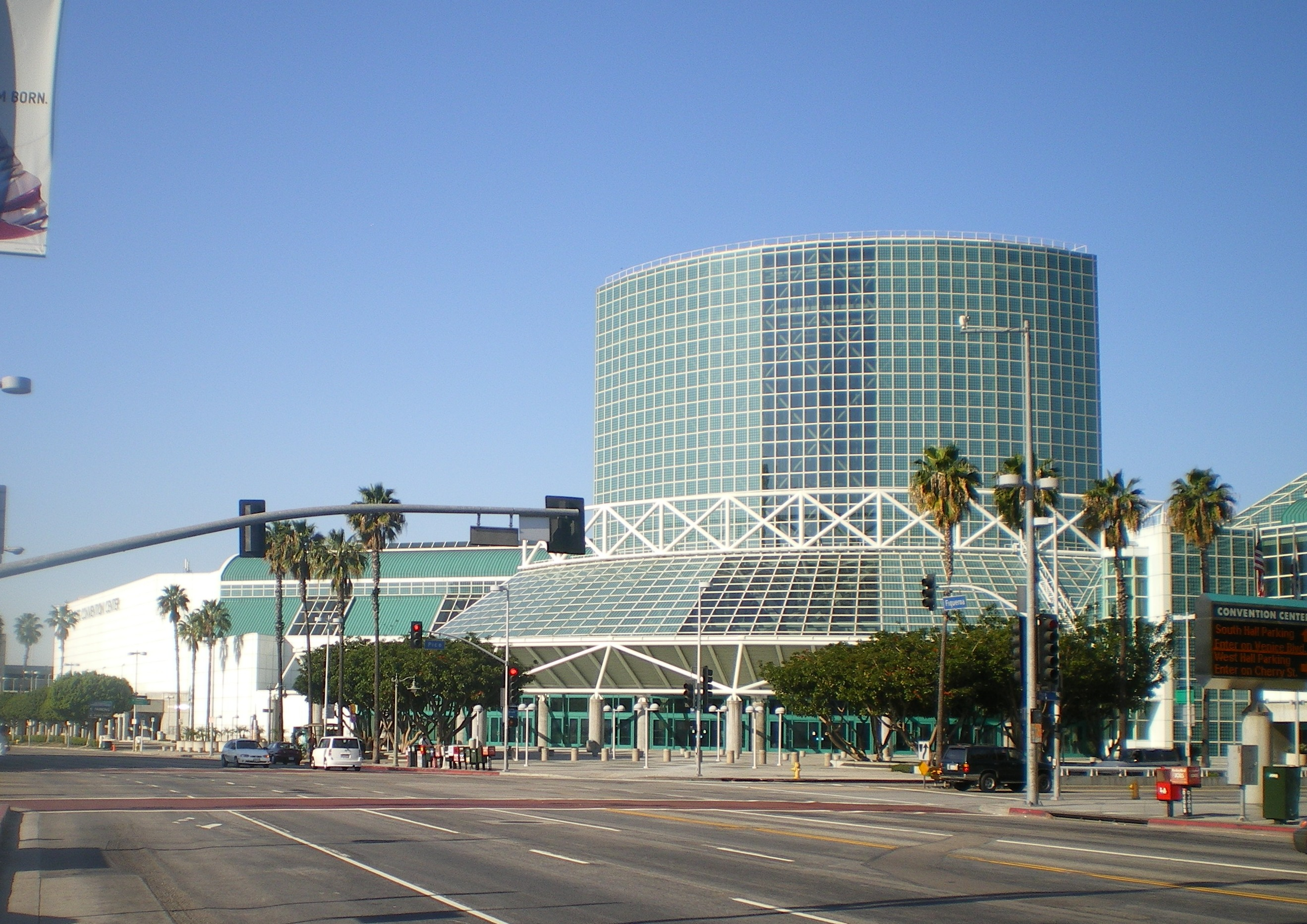
Los Angeles Convention Center at Pico Boulevard and Figueroa

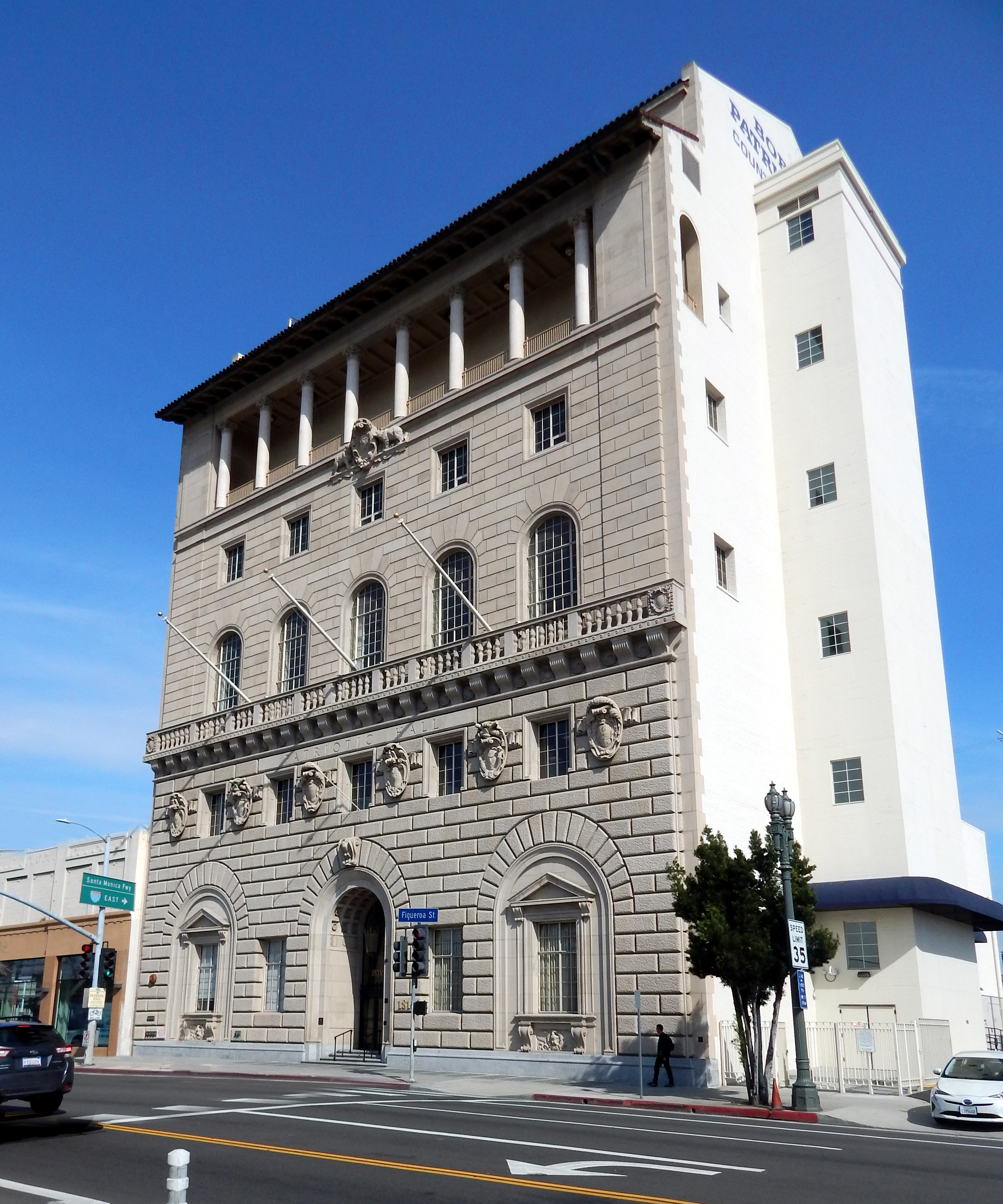
Bob Hope Patriotic Hall, 1816 South Figueroa

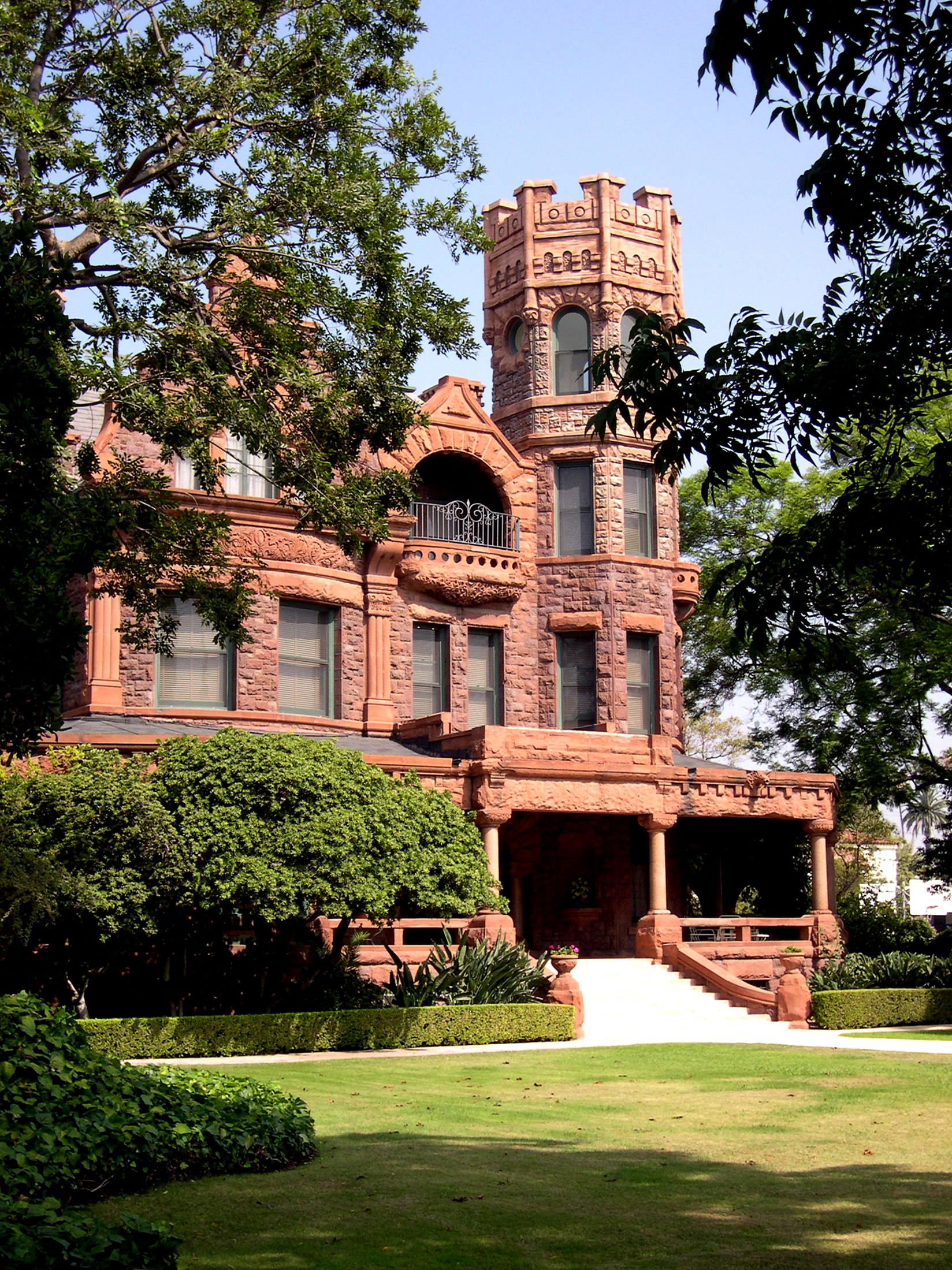
Stimson House (1891), 2421 South Figueroa

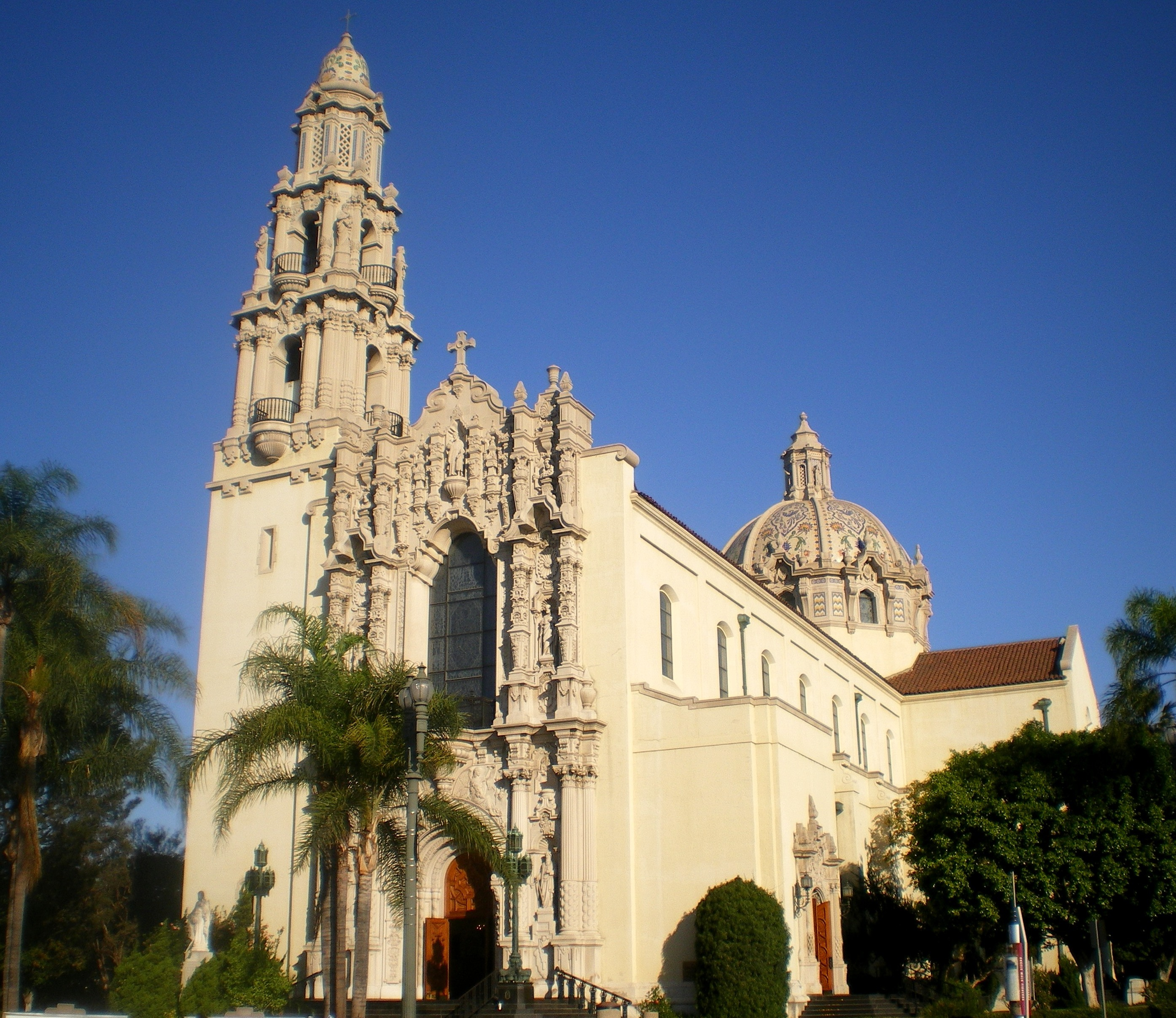
St Vincent de Paul Catholic Church, Figueroa at Adams Boulevard (NorthWest corner)

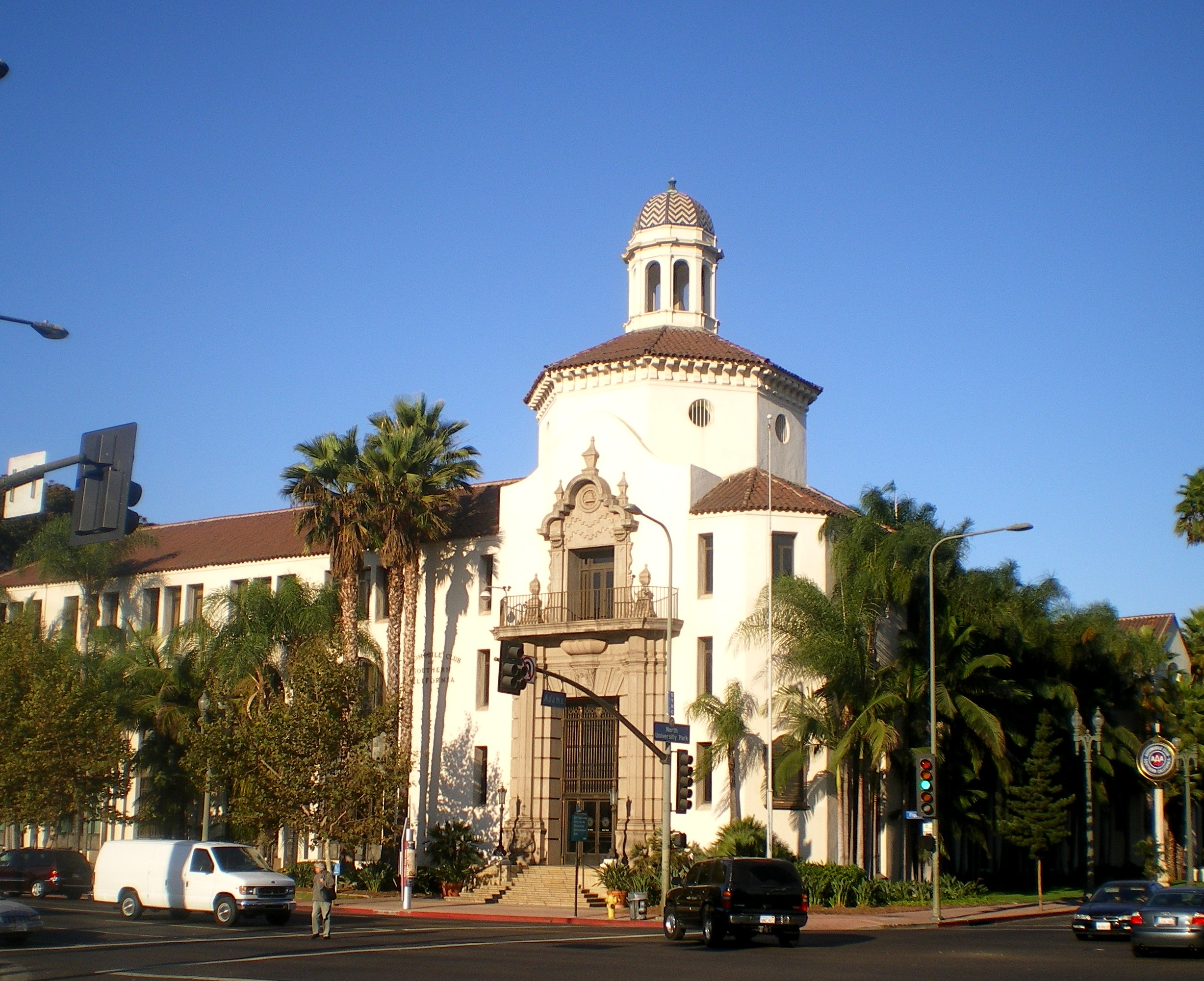
Automobile Club of Southern California, Figueroa at Adams Boulevard (SouthWest corner)

Felix Chevrolet (iconic neon sign), Figueroa at Jefferson Boulevard (photo: John Margolies, 1977)

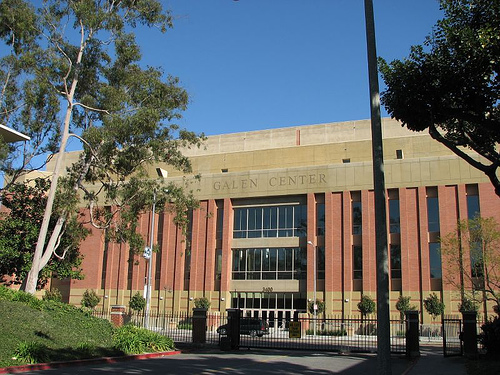
Galen Center on the USC campus at Jefferson Boulevard, 2007

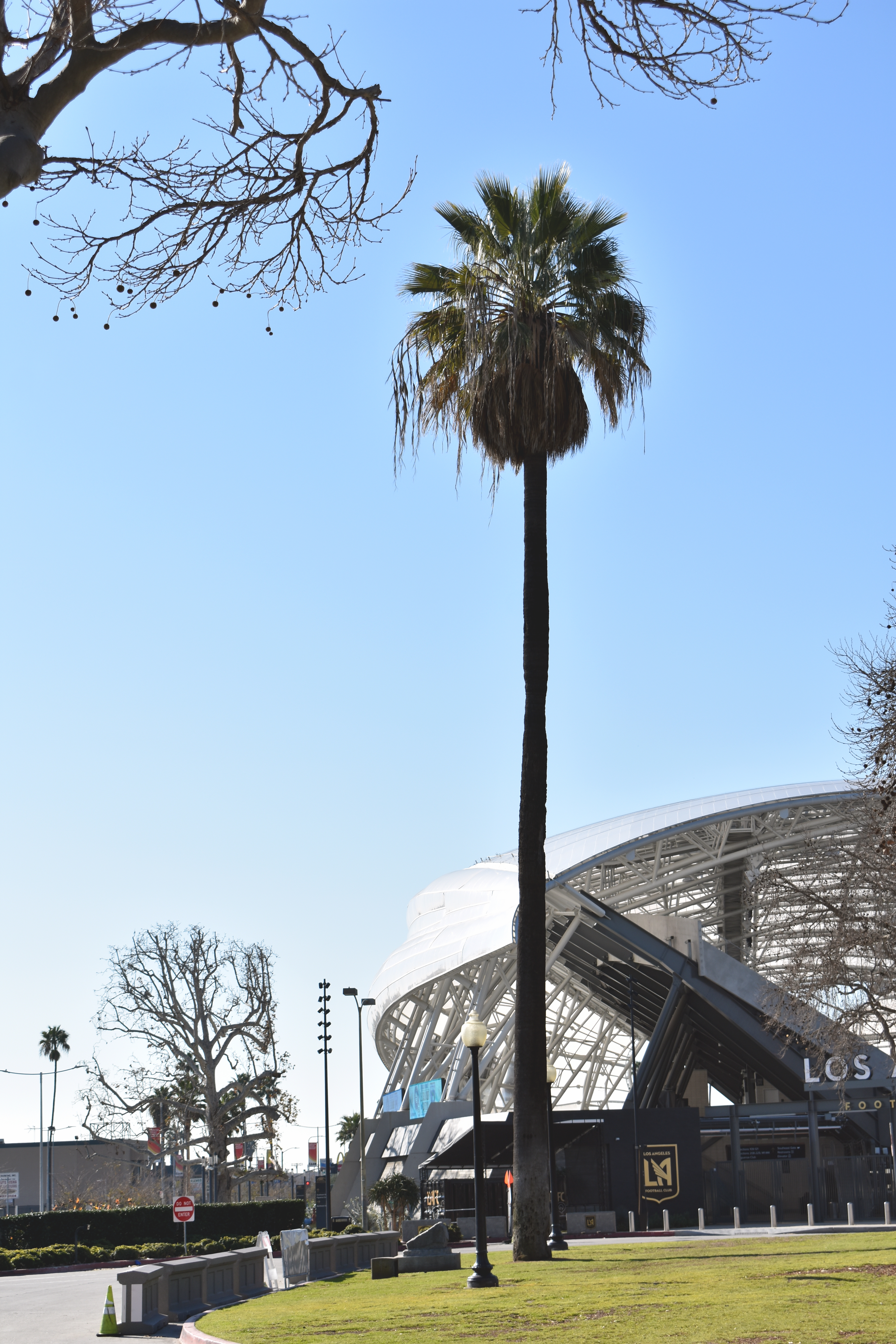
BMO Stadium, Exposition Park, and historic palm tree

== See also ==
- Red-light district
