= Mission station (disambiguation) =

A mission station is a base for a Christian mission.

Mission station may also refer to:

- Mission station (Los Angeles Metro), now known as South Pasadena station, California, United States
- Mission City station, British Columbia, Canada
- Mission Harbour station, British Columbia, Canada
