= Kobe Bryant Day =

Holiday honoring Kobe Bryant

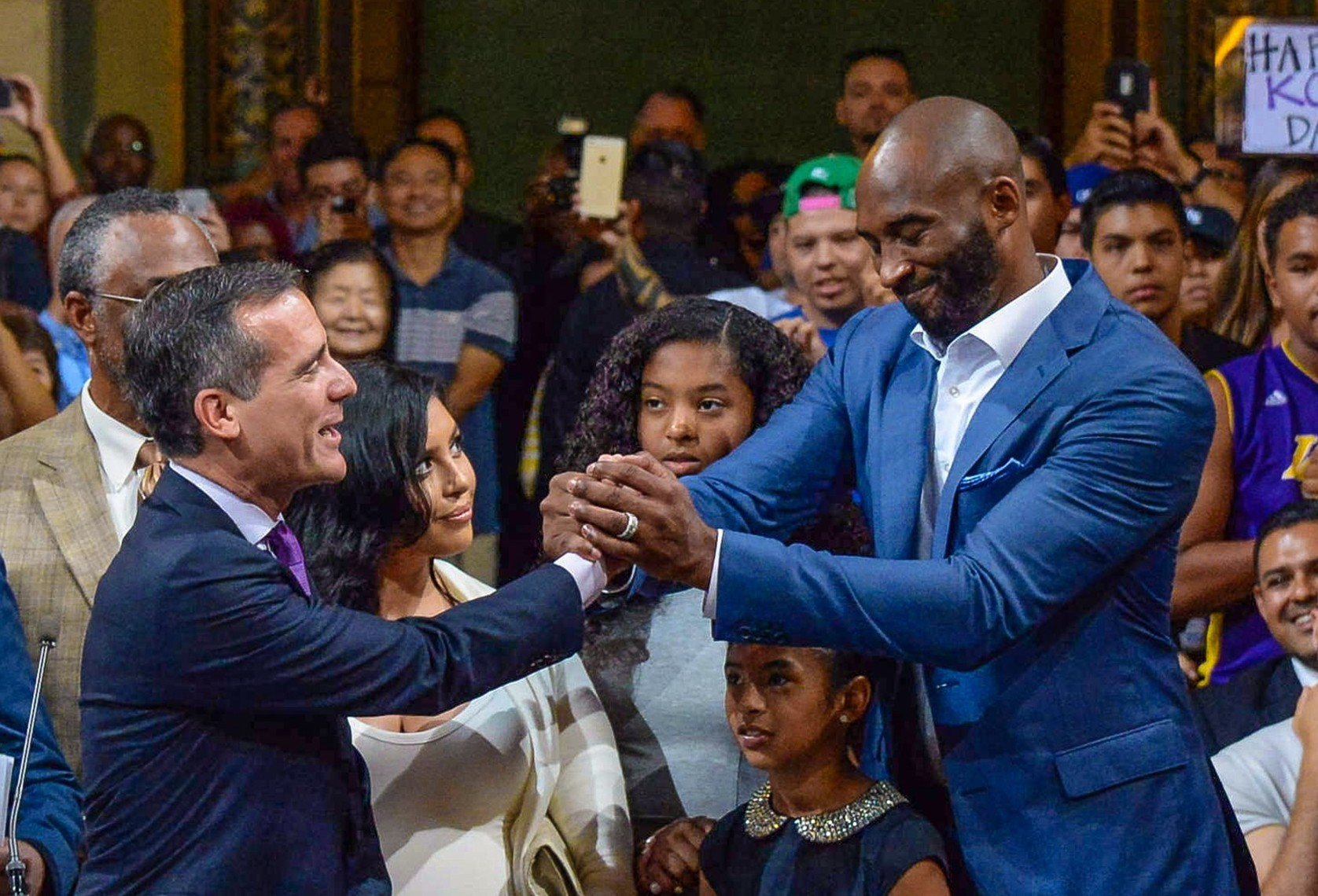
- Mayor Eric Garcetti with Kobe Bryant after declaring "Kobe Bryant Day" in 2016.
- Also called: Black Mamba Day; Mamba Day
- Observed by: Los Angeles (since 2016); Orange County (since 2020); NBA (since 2020); United States (since 2021)
- Significance: Numbers worn on Bryant's jerseys; Day after Bryant's birthday
- Date: August 24
- Frequency: Annual
- First time: 2016

Kobe Bryant Day (also called Mamba Day (Note: Not to be confused with the "Mamba Day" celebrated by Nike on April 13, 2016.)) is a day that is celebrated on August 24 in Los Angeles and Orange County commemorating the life of basketball player Kobe Bryant. The date was chosen as the holiday because of Bryant's numbers on his jerseys (8 and 24), as well as it being the day after his birthday, August 23. On July 27, 2021, California congresswoman Michelle Steel introduced a resolution that would recognize the day nationally.

== History ==
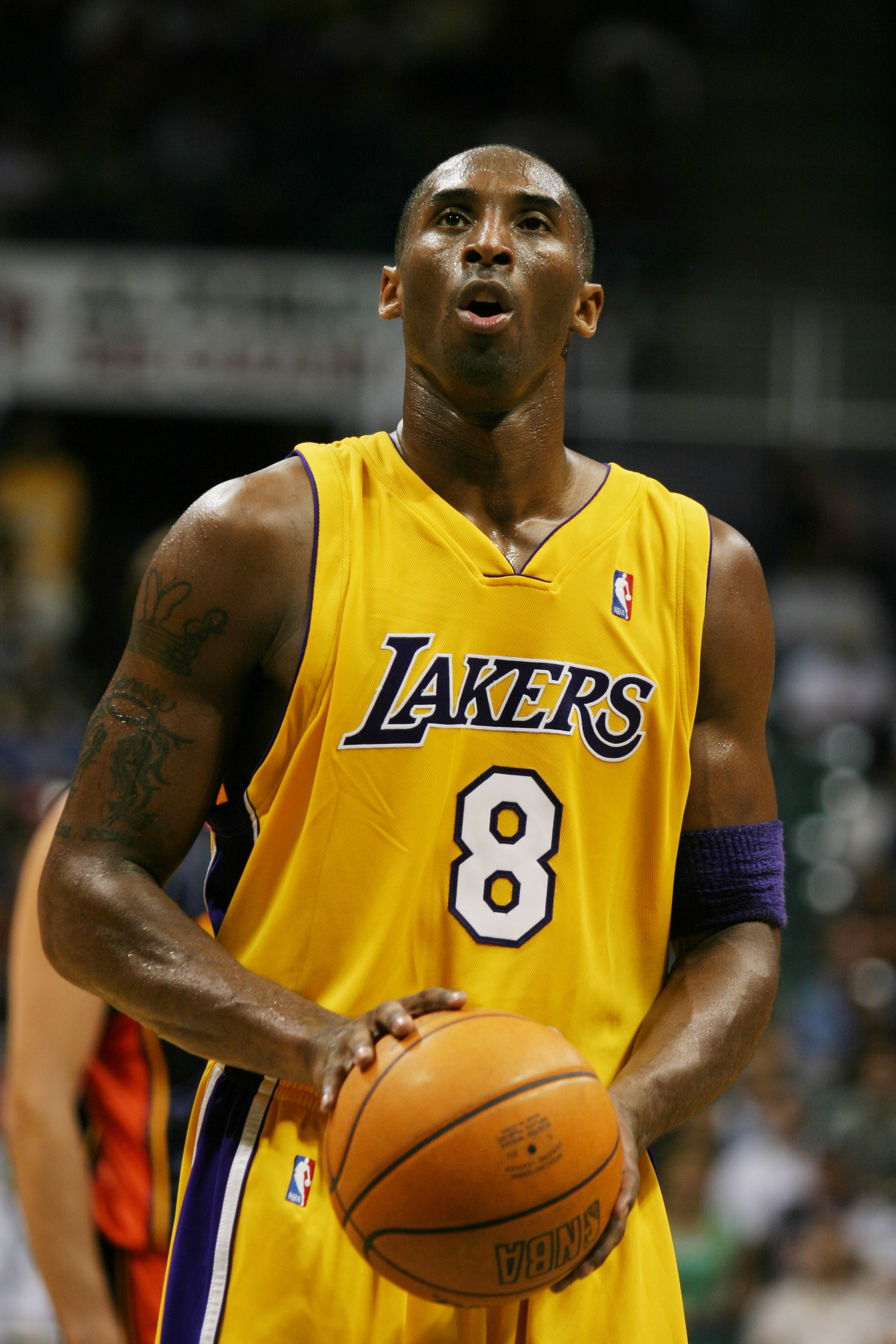
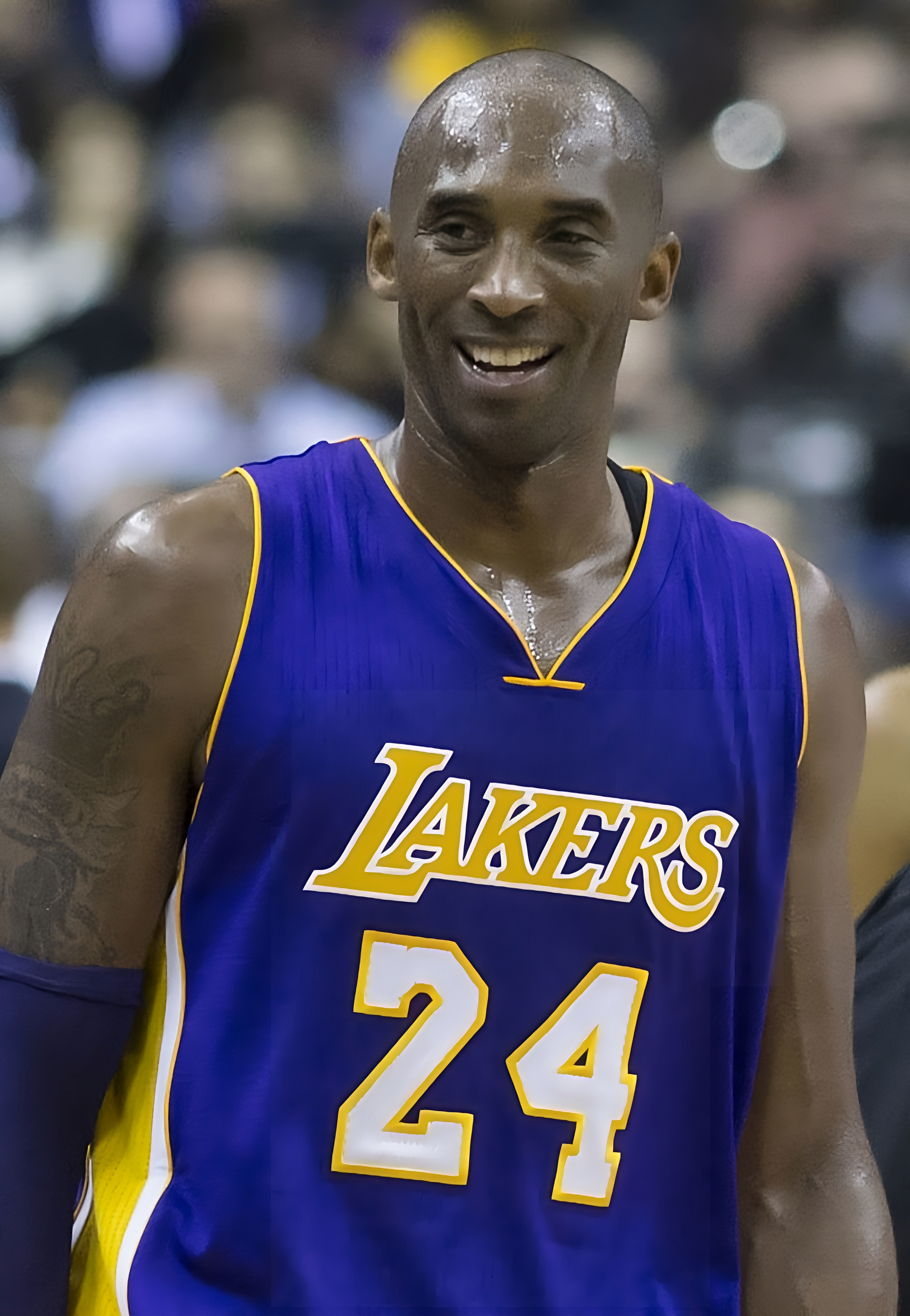
Kobe Bryant in 2005 and 2015, with the jersey numbers 8 and 24, used for the date 8/24.

In 2016, following Bryant's retirement from basketball, the City of Los Angeles declared August 24 as Kobe Bryant Day, recognizing his philanthropy with the Kobe and Vanessa Bryant Family Foundation, which "dedicated to improving the lives of youth and families in need and encouraging young people to stay active through sports". He was further acknowledged for United Way of Greater Los Angeles's annual HomeWalk, while also working with Make-A-Wish, NBA Cares, The Boys and Girls Clubs of America and After-School All-Stars.

On January 26, 2020, Kobe and his daughter Gianna, along with other seven passengers, died in a helicopter crash in Calabasas, California. After seven months, on August 12, 2020, the Orange County Board of Supervisors voted unanimously to declare August 24 as Kobe Bryant Day. It was proposed by Board of Supervisors Chairwoman Michelle Steel.

On August 23, the day before, Nike, Inc. launched "Mamba Week", which included product launches and programming honoring Bryant. Some of the products included sneakers and black jerseys with the two numbers. Nike also donated $1 million to the Mamba and Mambacita Foundation. The event was criticized for being limited and for being sold out in minutes.

The next day, Los Angeles City Council president Herb Wesson announced on his Twitter that a portion of Figueroa Street from Olympic to MLK Blvd would become "Kobe Bryant Boulevard". Also that day, during Game 4 of the first round of the 2020 NBA playoffs, Los Angeles Lakers players wore the "Black Mamba" jersey with "8" and "24" in honor of Bryant, with Damian Lillard wearing customized shoes with the numbers on the back. The Lakers notably led by a score of 24–8 during the first quarter and won over the Trail Blazers, leading by 38 points in the third quarter. In response to the win, LeBron James said that "[Bryant]'s here in the building" and that "the stars aligned".
