= Fillmore station =

Los Angeles Metro Rail station

Fillmore
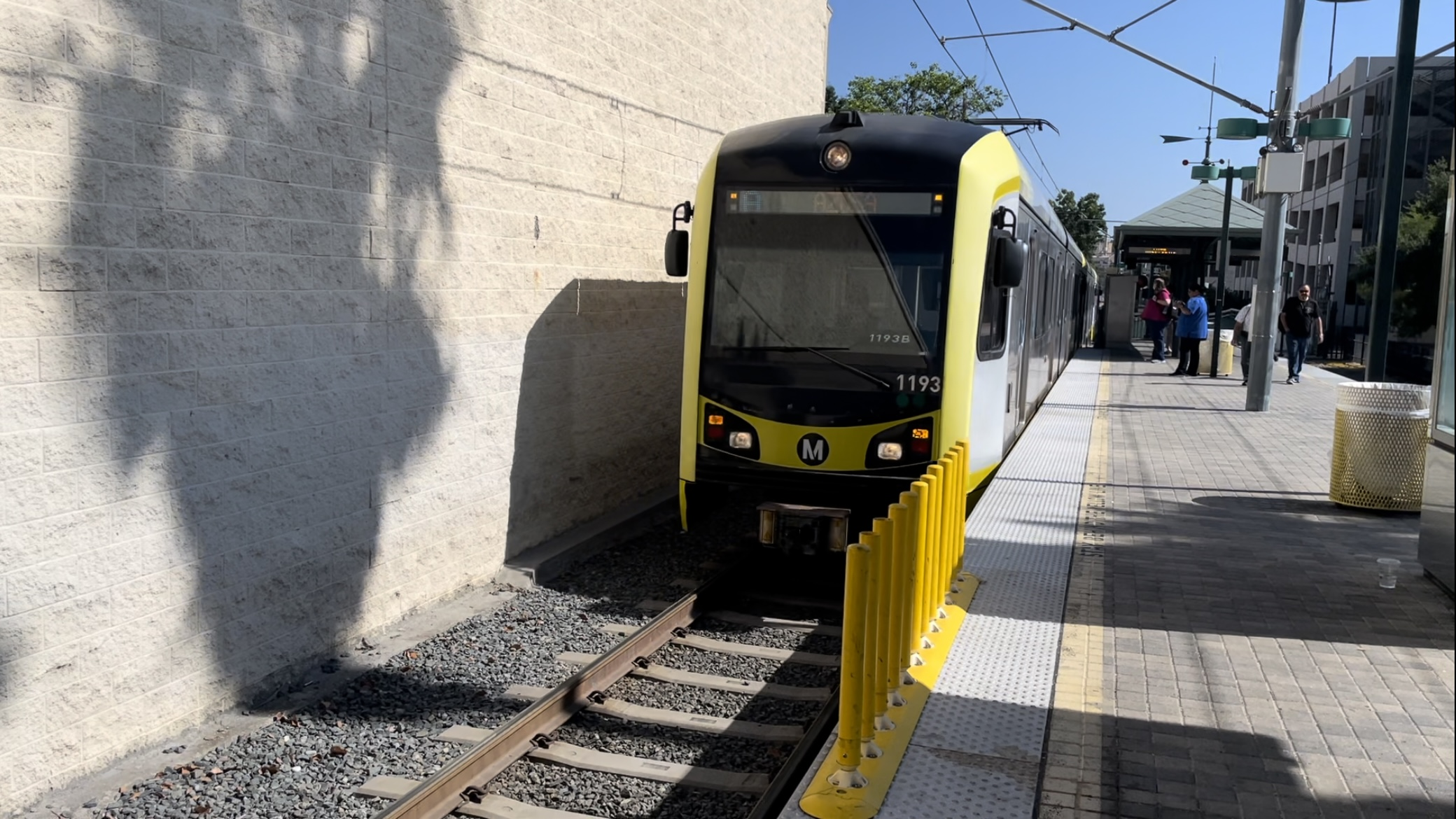
- Northbound A Line train approaching the platform in August 2023

General information
- Location: 95 Fillmore Street; Pasadena, California
- Coordinates: 34.1331°N 118.1482°W
- Owner: Los Angeles County Metropolitan Transportation Authority
- Platforms: 1 island platform
- Tracks: 2
- Connections: ArtCenter College of Design Shuttle; Los Angeles Metro Bus; Pasadena Transit

Construction
- Structure type: At-grade
- Parking: 155 spaces
- Cycle facilities: Racks
- Accessible: Yes

History
- Opened: July 26, 2003

Passengers
- FY 2025: 952 (avg. wkdy boardings)

Services
Preceding station	Metro Rail	Following station
South Pasadena toward Long Beach	A Line	Del Mar toward Pomona
Former services
Preceding station	Metro Rail	Following station
South Pasadena toward East Los Angeles	L Line	Del Mar toward Azusa
Location

Fillmore station is an at-grade light rail station on the A Line of the Los Angeles Metro Rail system. It is located on Fillmore Street, after which the station is named, between Raymond Avenue and Arroyo Parkway in Pasadena, California. The station opened on July 26, 2003, as part of the original Gold Line, then known as the "Pasadena Metro Blue Line" project.

This station features station art called Geologica 42, created by artist Michael C. McMillen. Platform seating was designed in the form of steamer trunks. The station has a parking lot with both free (first-come, first-served) and reserved paid parking.

== Service ==
=== Hours and frequency ===
A Line service hours are from approximately 4:30 a.m. and 11:45 p.m. daily. Trains operate every 8 minutes during peak hours, Monday to Friday. Trains run every 10 minutes, during midday on weekdays and weekends, from 9:00 a.m. to 7:00 p.m. Night and early morning service is approximately every 20 minutes every day.

=== Connections ===
As of December 15, 2024, the following connections are available:

- ArtCenter College of Design Shuttle (students/staff only)
- Los Angeles Metro Bus: 260
- Pasadena Transit: 20, 51, 52

== Notable places nearby ==
The station is within walking distance of the following notable places:

- Art Center College of Design South Campus
- Huntington Hospital
- Rose Palace
