= Scholl Canyon Landfill =

Coordinates: 34.156608°N 118.192799°W

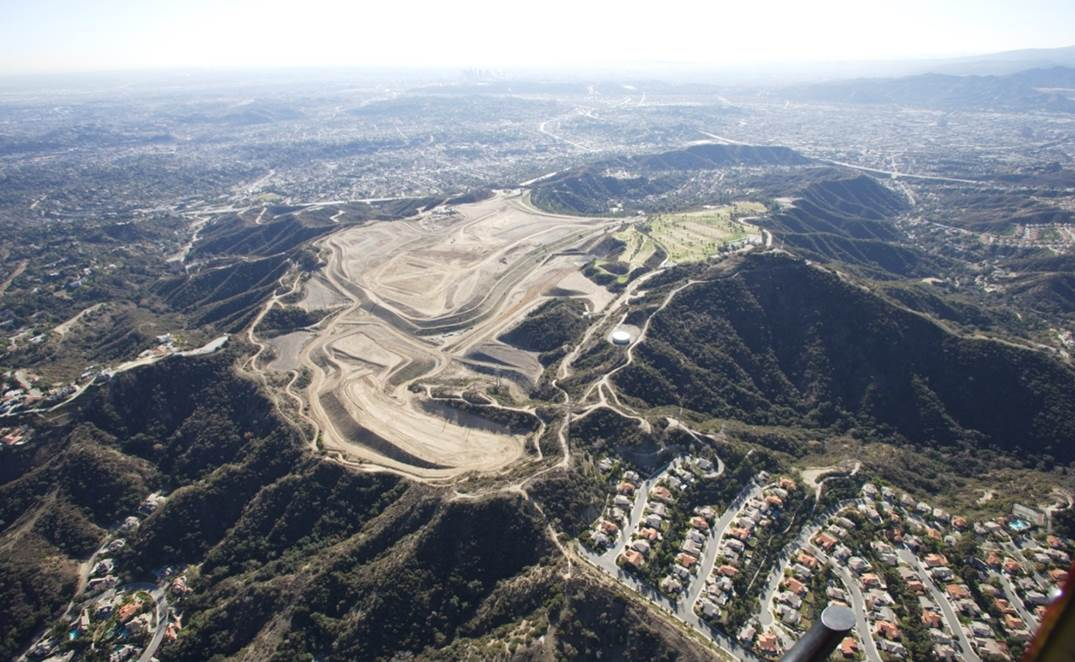
Southwest view of Glendale's Scholl Canyon Landfill in the San Rafael Hills. Active landfill predominates, small golf course to right.

The Scholl Canyon Landfill is a municipal solid waste disposal facility and landfill located in the central San Rafael Hills, within eastern Glendale in Los Angeles County, southern California. The 314 acres (127 ha) of land is located at 3001 Scholl Canyon Road, north of the Ventura Freeway (State Route 134), east of the Glendale Freeway (State Route 2), north of Eagle Rock, and west of the Arroyo Seco. It is owned by the City of Glendale. The landfill opened in 1961.

The site accepts such waste as segregated asphalt, municipal solid and inert waste, clean dirt, manure, segregated uncontaminated green waste, scrap tires, and construction/demolition and industrial material.

Regional access to the landfill is from the Ventura Freeway (State Route 134) at the Figueroa Street exit. Public access is only from Scholl Canyon Road.

== Capacity ==
As of December 2011, the site contained 314 acres (127 ha) of waste out of a total permitted 440 acres. This landfill is allowed to receive 3,400 tons per day.

It has a remaining capacity of 9,900,000 cubic yards (7,600,000 m^{3}). Its estimated closure date is 2030.

== Power generation ==
In 1994, a 5 mi (8.0 km) pipeline was completed that transports methane gas produced at Scholl Canyon Landfill to the steam boilers at the city's Grayson Power Plant. Since 1994, three Grayson Units have generated power using this methane blended with natural gas. During 2012, the Plant generated approximately 80,000 MWh from Scholl Canyon landfill gas, providing 7% of Glendale’s energy needs.

== Projects ==
Bidding took place in July 2015 for geotechnical slope repair at the landfill, with Los Angeles Engineering, Inc. awarded the contract.

=== Proposed expansion ===
The City of Glendale established its Zero Waste Policy in 2010, including to operating a clean, high-tech, and integrated waste management system, needing expansion of the landfill. In 2014, The City of Glendale issued a Draft Environmental Impact Report (EIR) to address potential impacts from implementation of the proposed Scholl Canyon Landfill Expansion project. The Draft EIR (DEIR) was circulated for a 60-day review/comment period from April to July 2014. It is for the landfill to transition to a conversion technology facility. Technologies such as gasification, pyrolysis, and plasma arc are being considered.

At an October 2015 public meeting on the proposed expansion project and DEIR, the city stated it "has no immediate plans to proceed with any expansion and possibly may not for quite some time, if ever, depending on the success of the City’s aggressive waste management alternatives."

== Golf course and tennis courts ==
The Scholl Canyon Golf and Tennis Club was built in 1993, by the American Golf Corp. based in Santa Monica. The 56 acres (23 ha) project was constructed on top of the northwest part of the landfill in the San Rafael Hills. This layout replaced a golf facility that was closed in 1989 after dangerous levels of methane were released from under the golf course.

== See also ==
- Environmental issues in California
- Landfills in the United States
- San Rafael Hills topics
