= Southwest Museum station =

Los Angeles Metro Rail station

Southwest Museum
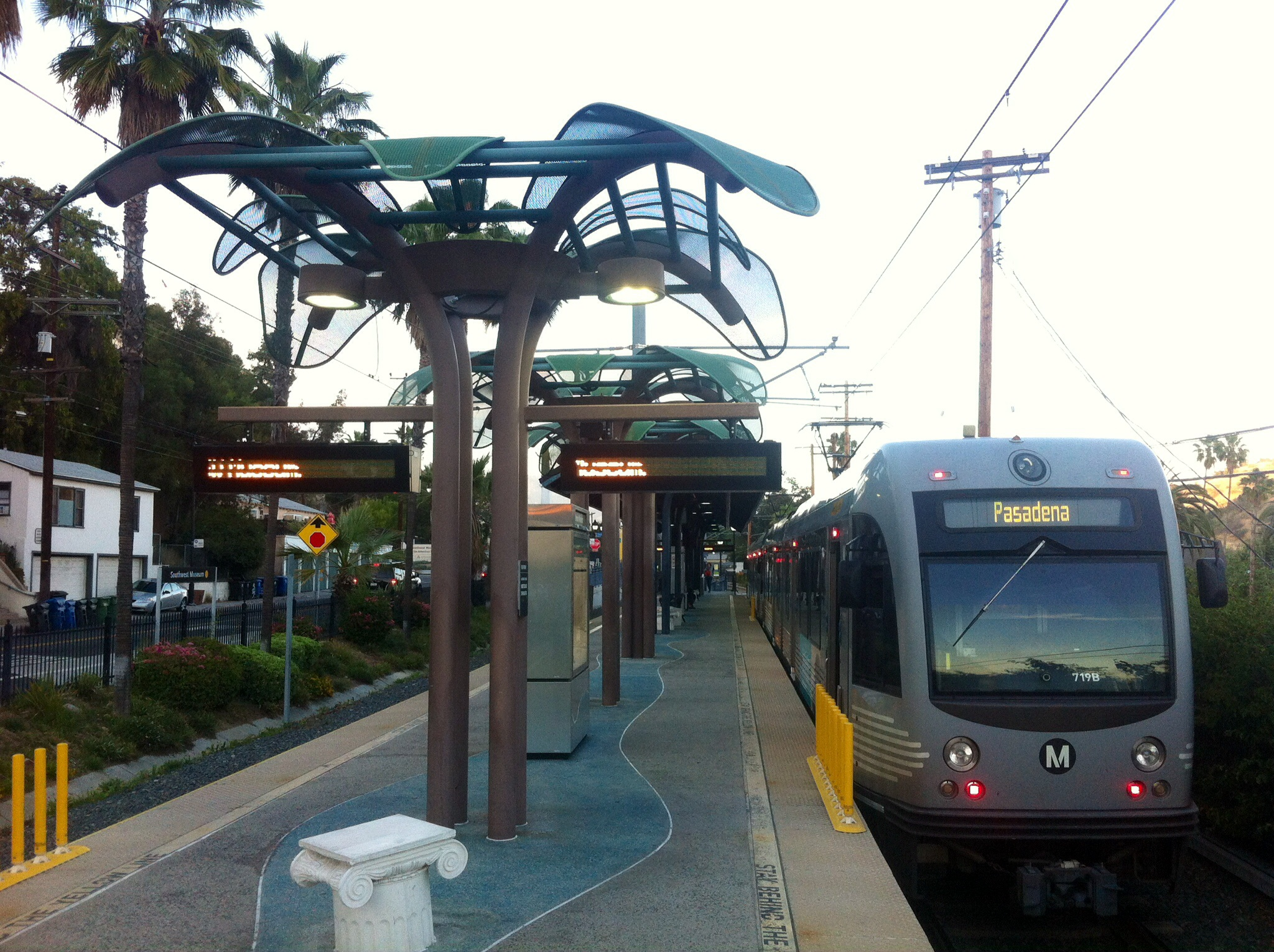
- Southwest Museum station platform in 2015

General information
- Location: 4600 Marmion Way; Los Angeles, California
- Coordinates: 34.0983°N 118.2067°W
- Owner: Los Angeles County Metropolitan Transportation Authority
- Platforms: 1 island platform
- Tracks: 2
- Connections: Los Angeles Metro Bus

Construction
- Structure type: At-grade
- Cycle facilities: Racks
- Accessible: Yes

History
- Opened: July 26, 2003

Passengers
- FY 2026: 453 (avg. wkdy boardings)

Services
Preceding station	Metro Rail	Following station
Heritage Square toward Long Beach	A Line	Highland Park toward Pomona
Former services
Preceding station	Metro Rail	Following station
Heritage Square toward East Los Angeles	L Line	Highland Park toward Azusa
Location

Southwest Museum station is an at-grade light rail station on the A Line of the Los Angeles Metro Rail system. It is located near the intersection of Marmion Way at Museum Drive in the Mount Washington neighborhood of Los Angeles. The station opened on July 26, 2003, as part of the original Gold Line, then known as the "Pasadena Metro Blue Line" project.

The station is named after the nearby Southwest Museum of the American Indian, which closed in 2022. The station features an enhanced architectural design, called Highland Park Gateway, created by artists Teddy Sandoval and Paul Polubinskas.

== Service ==
=== Hours and frequency ===
A Line service hours are from approximately 4:30 a.m. and 11:45 p.m. daily. Trains operate every 8 minutes during peak hours, Monday to Friday. Trains run every 10 minutes, during midday on weekdays and weekends, from 9:00 a.m. to 7:00 p.m. Night and early morning service is approximately every 20 minutes every day.

=== Connections ===
As of December 15, 2024, the following connections are available:

- Los Angeles Metro Bus: 81, 182

== Notable places nearby ==
The station is within walking distance of the following notable places:

- Southwest Museum of the American Indian (built 1914, closed in 2022) — museum, library, and archive, Autry National Center property.
- Audubon Center in Ernest E. Debs Regional Park, east side of Arroyo Seco Parkway in the San Rafael Hills.
- Carlin G. Smith Recreation Center — West Avenue 46 off Figueroa Street.
- Casa de Adobe Museum (built 1916) — on North Figueroa Street, California Historical Landmark, Autry National Center property (closed)
- Lummis House (built 1897–1907) — West Avenues 42 & 43 at Arroyo Seco Parkway, historic house museum and gardens.
- Ramona Hall Community Center — 4580 Figueroa Street.
- Sycamore Grove Park — along Figueroa Street & the Arroyo Seco and Arroyo Seco Parkway.
