= South Pasadena station =

Los Angeles Metro Rail station

South Pasadena
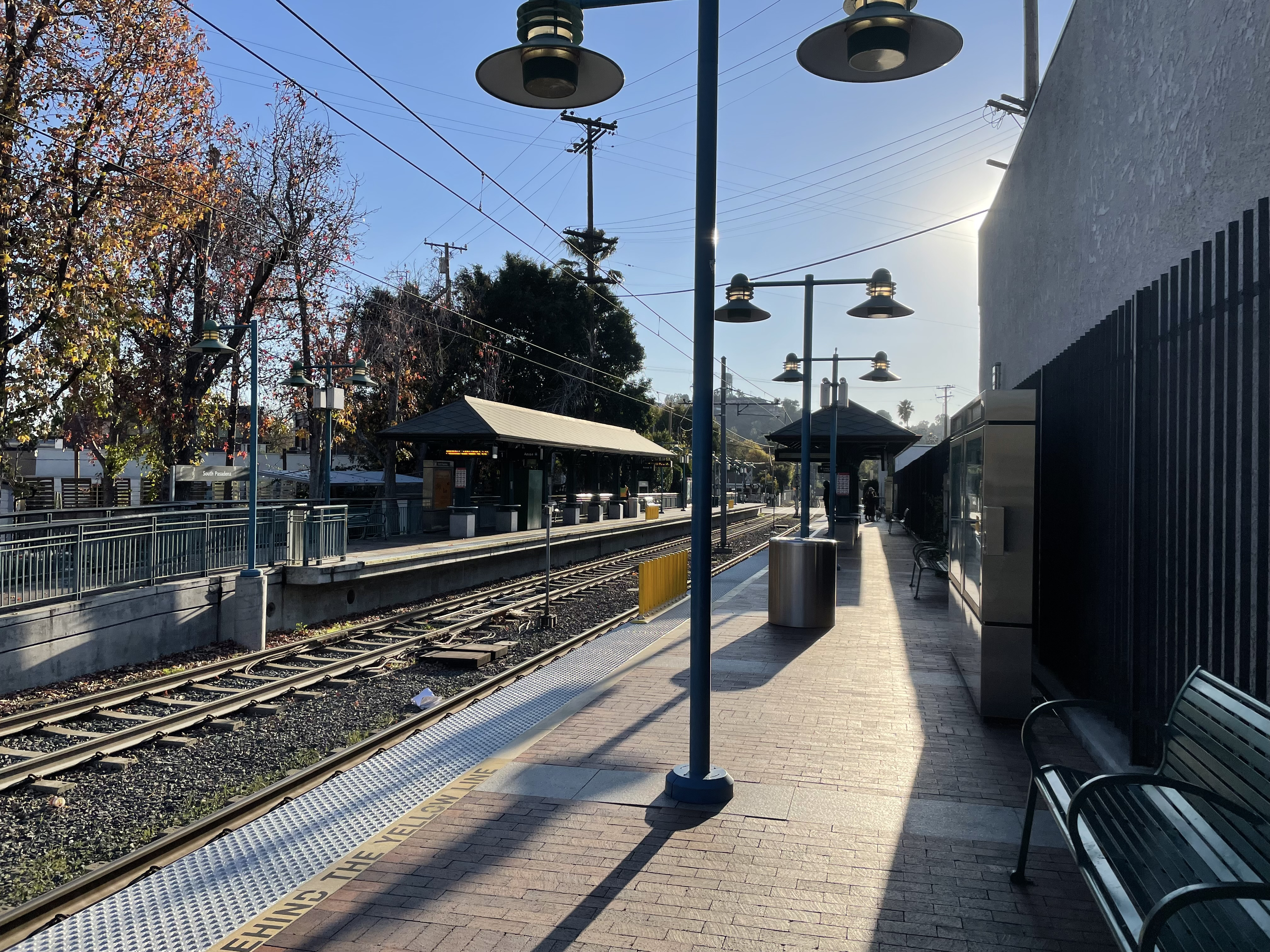
- South Pasadena station platforms in 2024

General information
- Location: 905 Meridian Avenue; South Pasadena, California
- Coordinates: 34.1157°N 118.1573°W
- Owner: Los Angeles County Metropolitan Transportation Authority
- Platforms: 2 side platforms
- Tracks: 2
- Connections: Los Angeles Metro Bus

Construction
- Structure type: At-grade
- Parking: 142 spaces
- Cycle facilities: Racks
- Accessible: Yes

History
- Opened: c. 1911; 115 years ago
- Rebuilt: July 26, 2003
- Former names: Mission (2003–2012)

Passengers
- FY 2025: 885 (avg. wkdy boardings)

Services
Preceding station	Metro Rail	Following station
Highland Park toward Long Beach	A Line	Fillmore toward Pomona
Former services
Preceding station	Metro Rail	Following station
Highland Park toward East Los Angeles	L Line	Fillmore toward Azusa
Preceding station	Atchison, Topeka and Santa Fe Railway	Following station
at AT&SF station
Lincoln Park toward Los Angeles	Main Line Via Pasadena, Pomona	Raymond Hill toward Chicago
Location

South Pasadena station (formerly Mission station) is an at-grade light rail station on the A Line of the Los Angeles Metro Rail system. It is located at the intersection of Mission Street and Meridian Avenue in South Pasadena, California, after which the station is named. The station opened on July 26, 2003, as part of the original Gold Line, then known as the "Pasadena Metro Blue Line" project.

This station features the adjacent station art sculpture "Astride-Aside" (2003) by artist Michael Stutz. The station has a 122-space park and ride lot, and there is a fee to park.

The original South Pasadena station and freight depot, for the Atchison, Topeka and Santa Fe Railway, was demolished in 1954.

== Service ==
=== Hours and frequency ===
A Line service hours are from approximately 4:30 a.m. and 11:45 p.m. daily. Trains operate every 8 minutes during peak hours, Monday to Friday. Trains run every 10 minutes, during midday on weekdays and weekends, from 9:00 a.m. to 7:00 p.m. Night and early morning service is approximately every 20 minutes every day.

=== Connections ===
As of December 15, 2024, the following connections are available:

- Los Angeles Metro Bus: 258

== Notable places nearby ==
The station is within walking distance of the following notable places:

- South Pasadena Public Library (a Carnegie Library)
- Meridian Ironworks Museum
- Mission West Business District
- Farmers Market (Thursdays from 4 pm to 8 pm)
