= Highland Park station (Los Angeles Metro) =

Los Angeles Metro Rail station

Highland Park
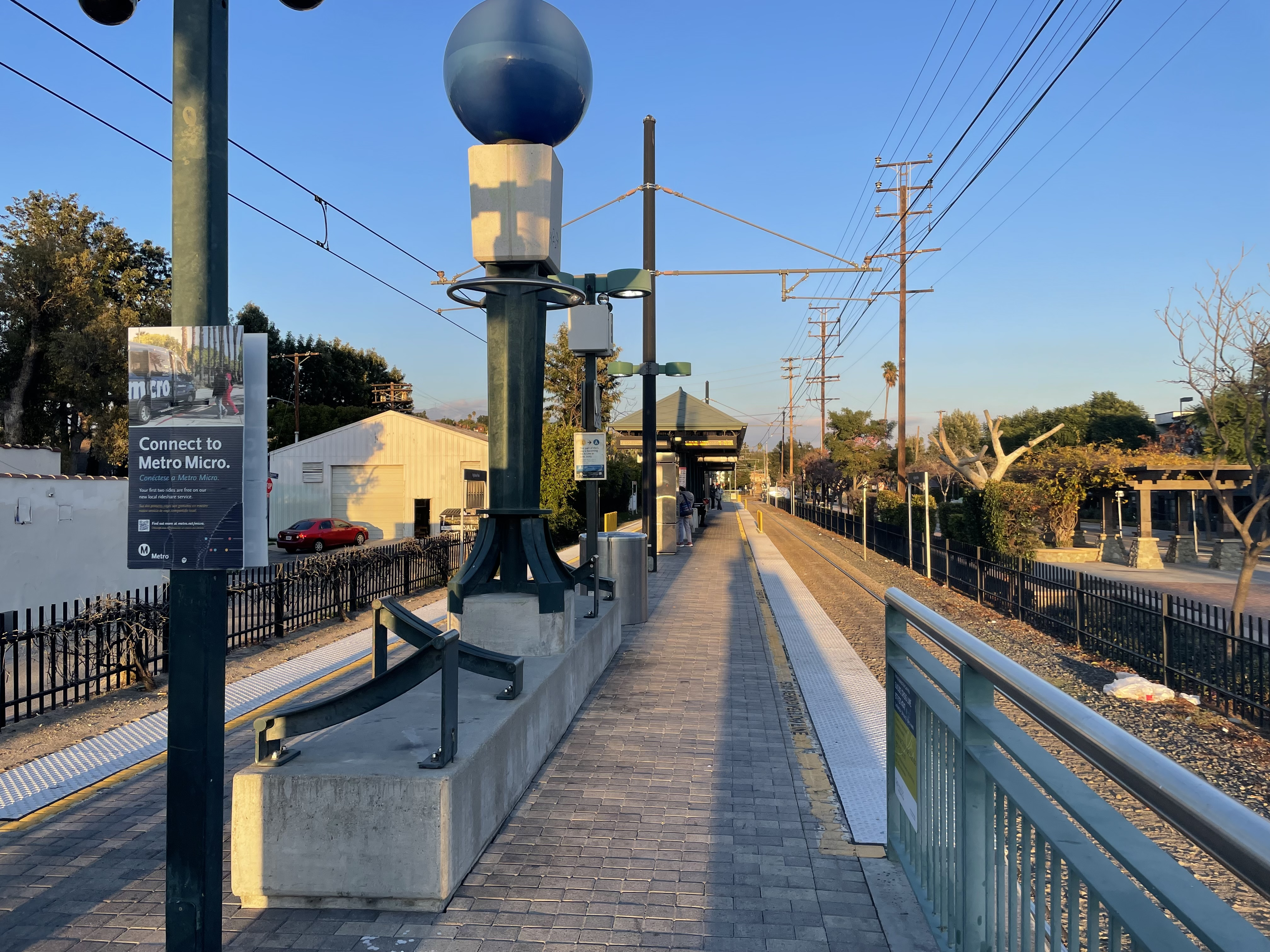
- Highland Park station platform in 2024

General information
- Location: 151 North Avenue 57; Los Angeles, California
- Coordinates: 34.1112°N 118.1926°W
- Owner: Los Angeles County Metropolitan Transportation Authority
- Platforms: 1 island platform
- Tracks: 2
- Connections: Los Angeles Metro Bus; LADOT DASH; Pasadena Transit

Construction
- Structure type: At-grade
- Cycle facilities: Racks and lockers
- Accessible: Yes

History
- Opened: c. 1911
- Closed: 1965
- Rebuilt: 2003
- Former names: Avenue 57

Passengers
- FY 2026: 1,501 (avg. wkdy boardings)

Services
Preceding station	Metro Rail	Following station
Southwest Museum toward Long Beach	A Line	South Pasadena toward Pomona
Former services
Preceding station	Metro Rail	Following station
Southwest Museum toward East Los Angeles	L Line	South Pasadena toward Azusa
Preceding station	Atchison, Topeka and Santa Fe Railway	Following station
at AT&SF station
Sycamore Grove toward Los Angeles	Main Line Via Pasadena, Pomona	Garvanza toward Chicago
Location

Highland Park station is an at-grade light rail station on the A Line of the Los Angeles Metro Rail system. It is located at the intersection of North Avenue 57 at Marmion Way (one block north of North Figueroa Street) in the Highland Park neighborhood of Los Angeles, after which the station is named. The station opened on July 26, 2003, as part of the original Gold Line, then known as the "Pasadena Metro Blue Line" project.

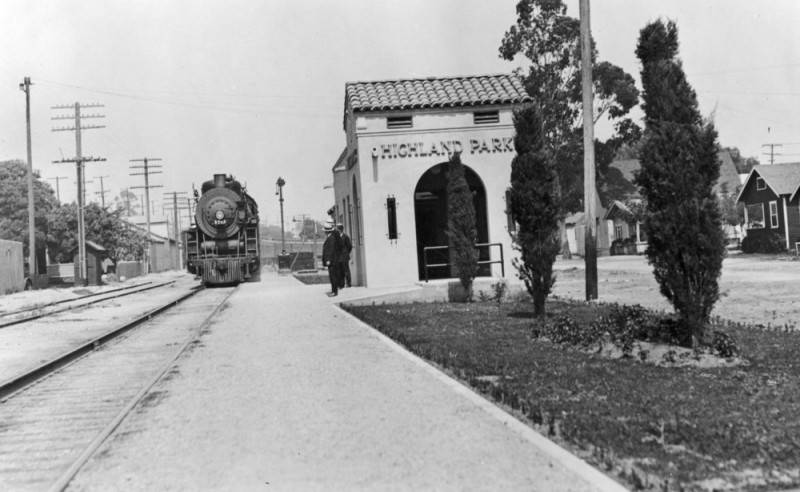
Original Highland Park train station

The original Highland Park station and freight depot, for the Atchison, Topeka and Santa Fe Railway, was demolished in 1965.

During the construction and planning stages, Highland Park station was originally planned to be named Avenue 57 station, named for nearby Avenue 57. It was one of three stations to be renamed shortly before the line's opening.

The station features an architectural sculpture, called 'Stone Tree Inverted Post (Bound Water Light),' created by artist Jud Fine.

== Service ==
=== Hours and frequency ===
A Line service hours are from approximately 4:30 a.m. and 11:45 p.m. daily. Trains operate every 8 minutes during peak hours, Monday to Friday. Trains run every 10 minutes, during midday on weekdays and weekends, from 9:00 a.m. to 7:00 p.m. Night and early morning service is approximately every 20 minutes every day.

=== Connections ===
As of December 15, 2024, the following connections are available:

- LADOT DASH: Highland Park/Eagle Rock
- Los Angeles Metro Bus: 81, 182
- Pasadena Transit: 33

== Notable places nearby ==
The station is within walking distance of the following notable places:

- Abbey San Encino
- Arroyo Seco Regional Library
- Highland Park Recreation Center
- Highland Theater
- L.A. Police Historical Museum
- Occidental College (in neighboring Eagle Rock)
