= Heritage Square station =

Los Angeles Metro Rail station

Heritage Square
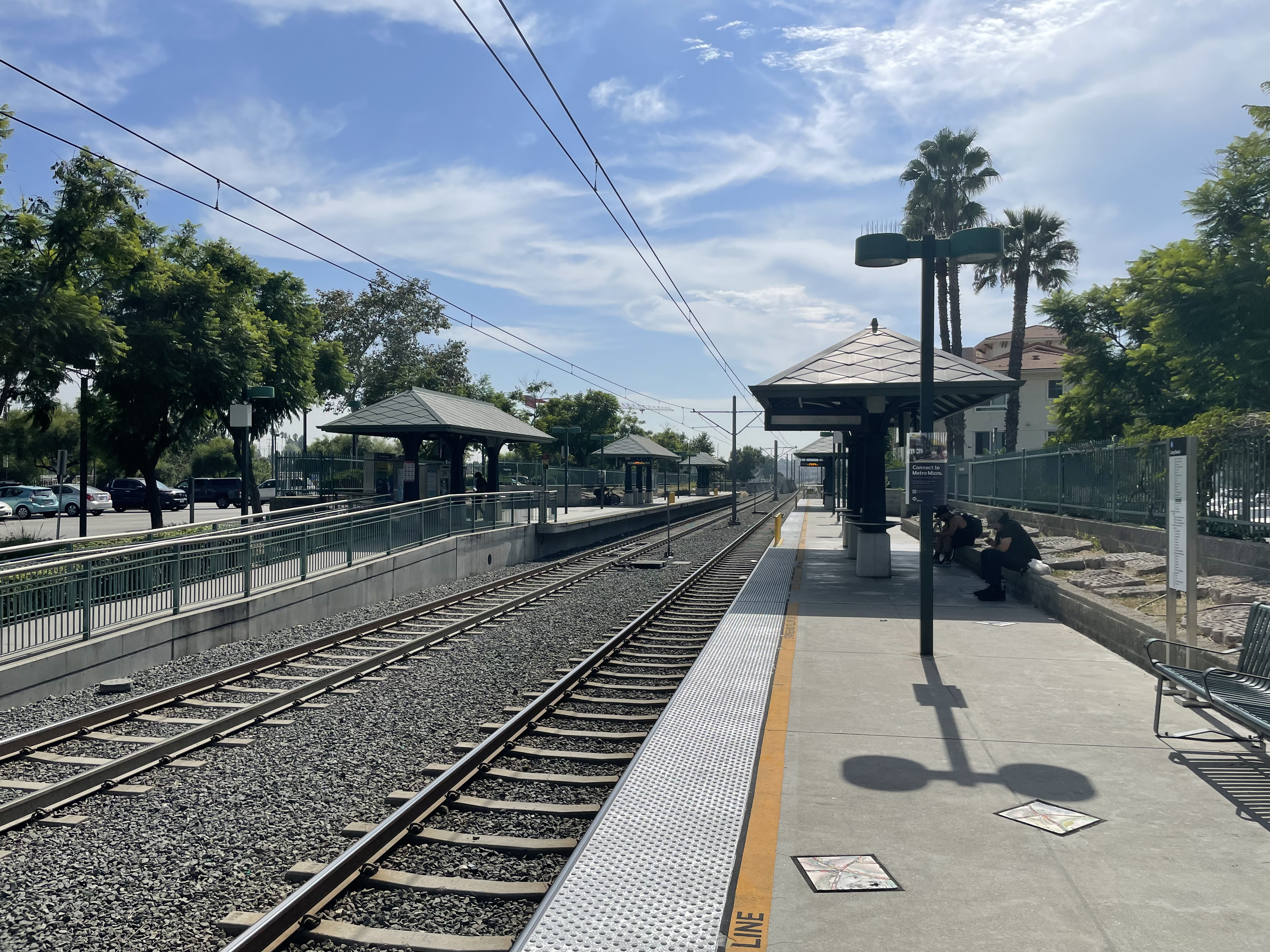
- Heritage Square station platforms

General information
- Location: 3545 Pasadena Avenue; Los Angeles, California
- Coordinates: 34.0871°N 118.2126°W
- Owner: Los Angeles County Metropolitan Transportation Authority
- Platforms: 2 side platforms
- Tracks: 2
- Connections: Los Angeles Metro Bus

Construction
- Structure type: At-grade
- Parking: 129 spaces
- Cycle facilities: Racks
- Accessible: Yes

History
- Opened: July 26, 2003
- Former names: French; Heritage Square/Arroyo; Heritage Square/The Arroyo

Passengers
- FY 2025: 446 (avg. wkdy boardings)

Services
Preceding station	Metro Rail	Following station
Lincoln/Cypress toward Long Beach	A Line	Southwest Museum toward Pomona
Former services
Preceding station	Metro Rail	Following station
Lincoln/Cypress toward East Los Angeles	L Line	Southwest Museum toward Azusa
Preceding station	Atchison, Topeka and Santa Fe Railway	Following station
at AT&SF station
Lincoln Heights toward Los Angeles	Main Line via Pasadena, Pomona	Sycamore Grove toward Chicago
Location

Heritage Square station is an at-grade light rail station on the A Line of the Los Angeles Metro Rail system. It is located at the intersection of French Avenue and Pasadena Avenue in the western Montecito Heights neighborhood of Los Angeles.

The station is named after the nearby Heritage Square Museum and is located in the lower Arroyo Seco valley between the San Rafael Hills and Mount Washington. It is adjacent to the Arroyo Seco Parkway (also known as California State Route 110 and the Pasadena Freeway).

Heritage Square station opened on July 26, 2003, as part of the original Gold Line, then known as the "Pasadena Metro Blue Line" project.

== Service ==
=== Hours and frequency ===
A Line service hours are from approximately 4:30 a.m. and 11:45 p.m. daily. Trains operate every 8 minutes during peak hours, Monday to Friday. Trains run every 10 minutes, during midday on weekdays and weekends, from 9:00 a.m. to 7:00 p.m. Night and early morning service is approximately every 20 minutes every day.

=== Connections ===
As of December 15, 2024, the following connections are available:

- Los Angeles Metro Bus: 81

== Former station names ==
During the construction and planning stages, Heritage Square station was originally planned to be named French station, after nearby French Avenue. It was one of three stations to be renamed shortly before the line's opening. It was then renamed to Heritage Square/Arroyo (also signed as Heritage Square/The Arroyo) for the nearby Heritage Square Museum complex and the Arroyo Seco creek and canyon. Metro now refers to the station by the shorter Heritage Square.
