= Lincoln/Cypress station =

Los Angeles Metro Rail station

Lincoln/Cypress
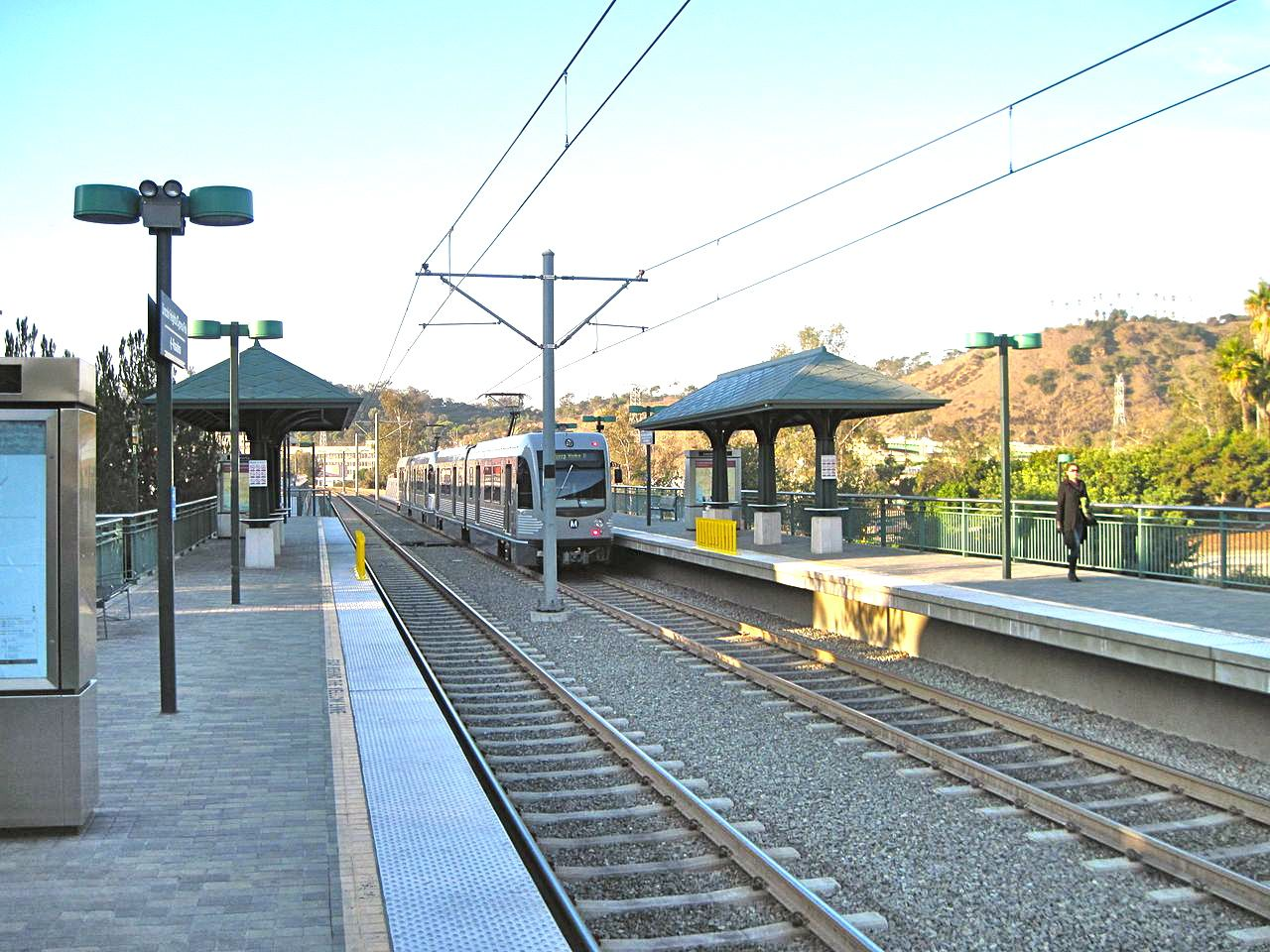
- Lincoln/Cypress station platform

General information
- Location: 370 West Avenue 26; Los Angeles, California
- Coordinates: 34.0813°N 118.2199°W
- Owner: Los Angeles County Metropolitan Transportation Authority
- Platforms: 2 side platforms
- Tracks: 2
- Connections: Los Angeles Metro Bus

Construction
- Structure type: Elevated
- Parking: 94 spaces
- Cycle facilities: Racks
- Accessible: Yes

History
- Opened: July 26, 2003
- Former names: Avenue 26; Lincoln Heights/Cypress Park

Passengers
- FY 2025: 950 (avg. wkdy boardings)

Services
| Preceding station | Metro Rail | Following station |
|---|---|---|
| Chinatown toward Long Beach | A Line | Heritage Square toward Pomona |
Former services
| Preceding station | Metro Rail | Following station |
|---|---|---|
| Chinatown toward East Los Angeles | L Line | Heritage Square toward Azusa |
| Preceding station | Atchison, Topeka and Santa Fe Railway | Following station |
at AT&SF station
| Los Angeles Terminus | Main Line via Pasadena, Pomona | Heritage Square toward Chicago |
Location

Lincoln/Cypress station is an elevated light rail station on the A Line of the Los Angeles Metro Rail system. It is located above Avenue 26 between Artesian Street and Lacy Street in the Lincoln Heights and Cypress Park neighborhoods of Los Angeles, and next to the line's crossing of Interstate 5 This station opened on July 26, 2003, as part of the original Gold Line, then known as the "Pasadena Metro Blue Line" project.

== Service ==
=== Hours and frequency ===
A Line service hours are from approximately 4:30 a.m. and 11:45 p.m. daily. Trains operate every 8 minutes during peak hours, Monday to Friday. Trains run every 10 minutes, during midday on weekdays and weekends, from 9:00 a.m. to 7:00 p.m. Night and early morning service is approximately every 20 minutes every day.

=== Connections ===
As of December 15, 2024, the following connections are available:

- Los Angeles Metro Bus: 251, 296

== Station artwork ==
A site-specific installation artwork, titled "Water Street: River of Dreams" by artist Cheri Gaulke, has visual references to metaphorically connect the Tongva people (Gabrieliño Indians) who once inhabited the area with a contemporary flowing landscape. A life-size bronze sculpture is of a Tongva woman drawing water from the imaginary river and pouring it into a tightly woven bronze basket. A 35 feet (11 m) long triptych “story fence” is located on the platform level, with cutout text related to the Tongva Indians and the life-enhancing Los Angeles River.

== Previous station names ==
During the construction and planning stages, Lincoln/Cypress station was originally planned to be named Avenue 26 station, named for nearby Avenue 26. It was one of three stations to be renamed shortly before the line's opening. It was then renamed Lincoln Heights/Cypress Park to reflect the neighborhoods that are served by the station. Metro now refers to the station using the shorter "Lincoln/Cypress".
