= Inglewood station =

Train station in southern California

Inglewood
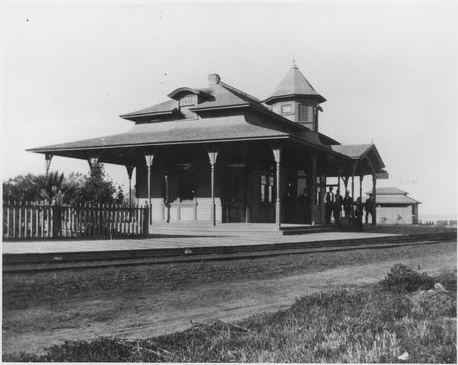
- Inglewood Depot, photographed by Atchison, Topeka, and Santa Fe Railway Company, late 1800s

General information
- Location: United States
- Coordinates: 33.9662°N 118.3589°W

History
- Opened: September 15, 1887
- Closed: 1928 (passengers) c. 1972–1974
- Original company: California Central Railway

Services
| Preceding station | Pacific Electric | Following station |
|---|---|---|
| Mesmer toward Ocean Park | Venice–Inglewood | Terminus |
| Preceding station | Atchison, Topeka and Santa Fe Railway | Following station |
| Wiseburn toward Redondo Beach | Redondo Beach Branch | Centinela toward La Grande Station |
| Mesmer toward Santa Monica | Santa Monica Branch | Terminus |
Location

The Inglewood depot in Inglewood, California, was built by Atchison, Topeka and Santa Fe Railway in September 1887. From 1902 to 1928 it was used for the Venice–Inglewood Line of the Los Angeles Railroad Pacific Electric Railway Depot, and then for Southern Pacific freight cars until the 1970s when the line was abandoned. The depot appeared in a 1920 Buster Keaton short called One Week, in Harold Lloyd's Safety Last! (1923), and it remained a popular filming location for decades.

According to a long-time station agent, before World War II, freight cars left the Inglewood depot carrying beans, bean straw and “loads of stoves, chemicals and fertilizers.”

During World War II, the depot handled war matériel and enabled transportation of personnel. A 1943 Associated Press story noted that rail transport was used so extensively during the war that it was affecting the local film industry: "In spite of wartime obstacles, all studios are making train scenes whenever it is necessary to the film plot. Now, it’s no longer possible to take a troupe over to Glendale, Pasadena, Inglewood or Alhambra for that purpose. Station platforms and trains are full. Once quiet spots along the main line are now seeing a train pass every 15 minutes, whether a film director likes it or not."

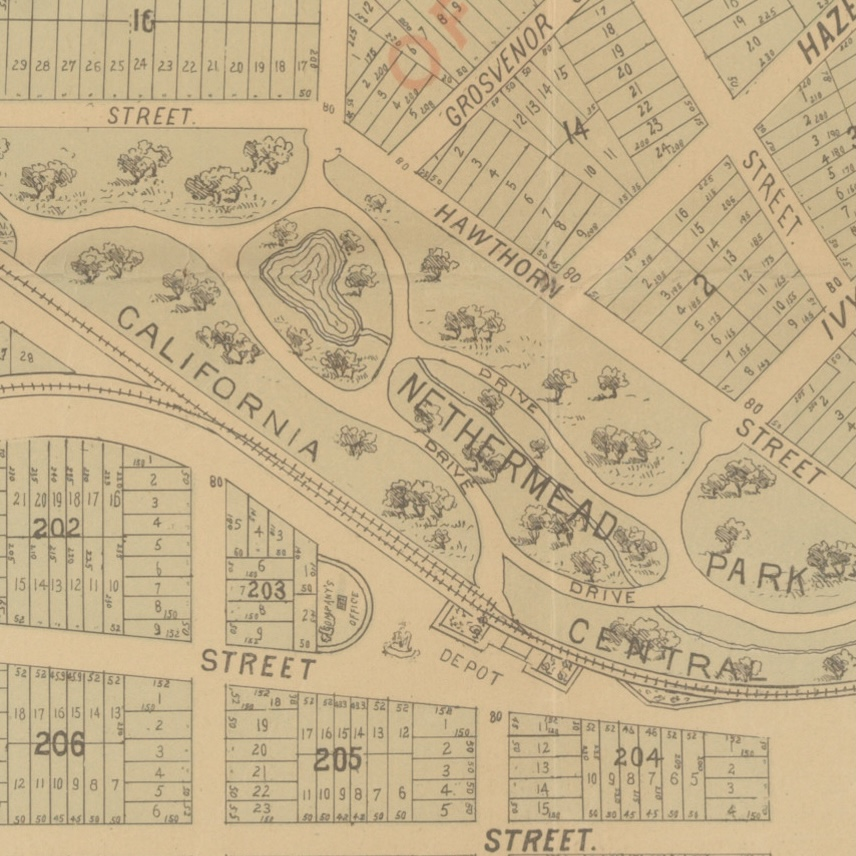
Centinela Creek, Centinela Springs pond, Centinela Park, and Inglewood Depot, with rail lines to Port Ballona and Redondo Beach via Redondo Junction, 1888

Post-war, the station handled household goods, missile parts, toys, furniture and “tank car products.”

The depot survived until the 1970s when it was irreparably damaged in an arson fire and demolished in 1972. (Another source says the fire was in 1972 and the demolition was 1974.)

== See also ==
- La Grande Station
- Redondo Junction, California
- Downtown Inglewood station (K Line), opened on October 7, 2022
