= Redondo Beach pier =

Pier in Redondo Beach, California, US

Coordinates: 33.839688°N 118.392654°W

The Redondo Beach pier is located in Redondo Beach, California, and stretches into the Pacific Ocean. The pier has been rebuilt and altered by storms and redevelopments. Its official name is "Municipal Pier," and it has also been called the "Endless Pier".

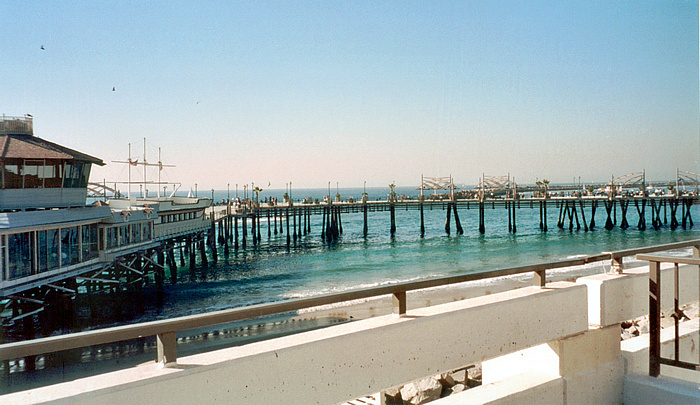
The unusually shaped pier looking northwest

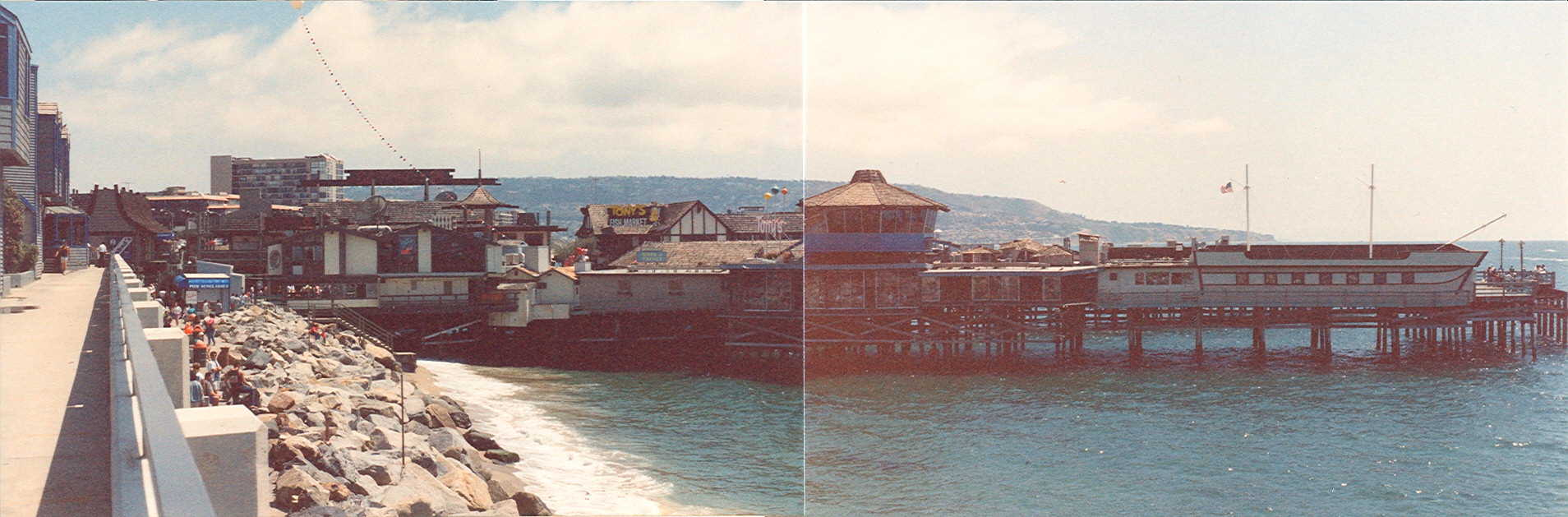
Redondo Beach pier looking south

The pier started out as a disjointed group of wharves near the end of the 19th century but evolved into an interconnected structure after a series of storms and demolitions throughout the 20th century. The pier area used to be heavily crowded with tourists and locals during the 1970s, but began to decline after the nearby Seaport Village project failed and went into bankruptcy in 1982.

In 1988, the pier was severely battered by two winter storms, and on May 27 it burned to the waterline due to an electrical short circuit (the fire was so large that a SigAlert was announced for the San Diego Freeway several miles away). The pier's modern reinforced concrete version was completed in 1995 and has brought back the appeal to Redondo Beach's business district ever since.

== History ==
=== 1800s ===
- 1889–1915, iron and wood "Wharf No. 1" built approximately where the current pier stands near Emerald Street to facilitate timber delivery from ships to trains; destroyed by a storm
- 1895–1920, Y-shaped wooden pier called "Wharf No. 2" with railroad tracks on one prong, the other for fishermen and tourists; built south of Wharf #1 near Ainsworth Court in front of the Hotel Redondo; severely damaged by a storm in 1919, subsequently open only to fishermen, but demolished for safety reasons

=== Early 1900s ===
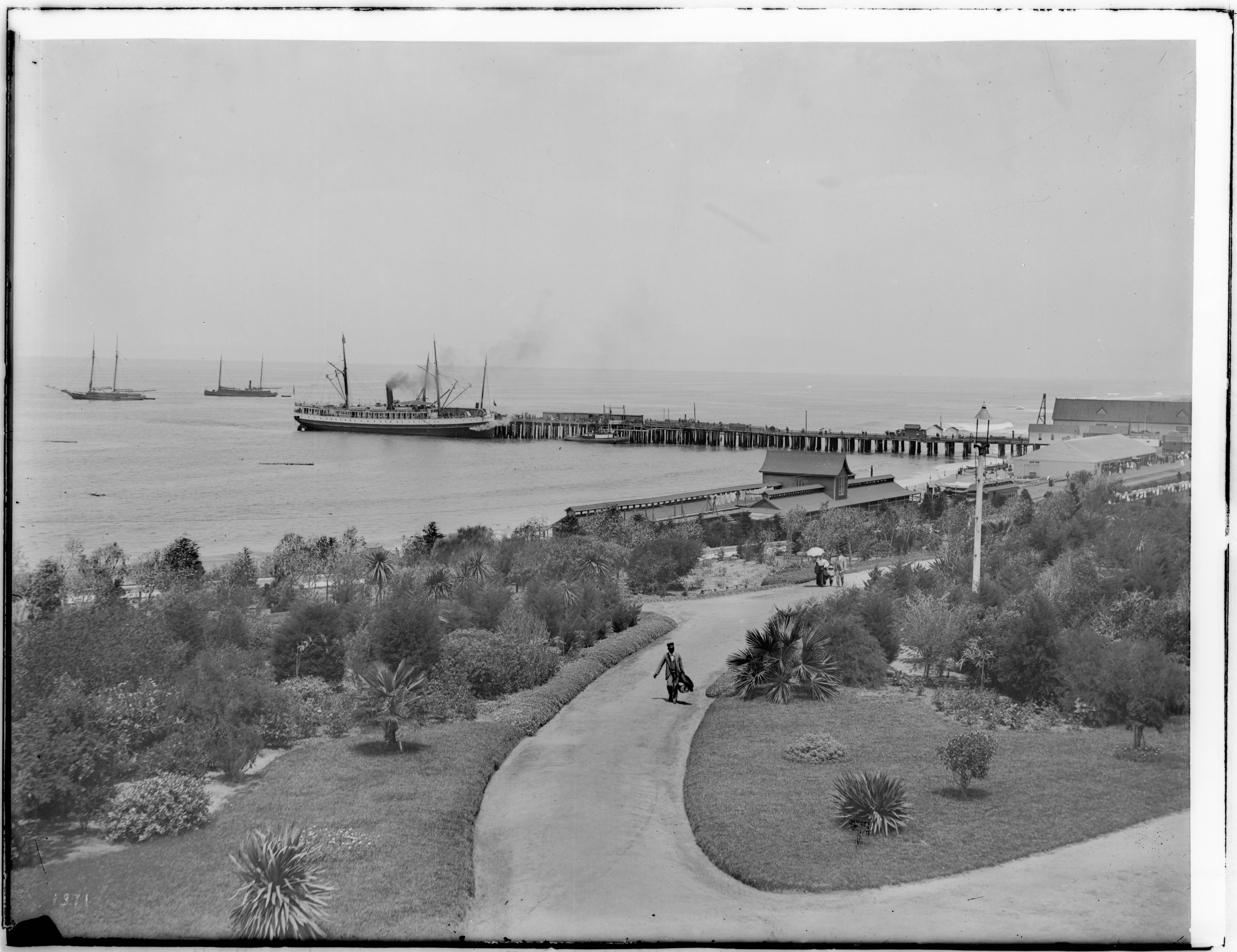
View of Redondo Beach Pier and railroad station from the Redondo Hotel, ca.1900

- 1903–1926, wooden "Wharf No. 3" built south of Wharf #2 near Sapphire and Topaz Streets; actively used by lumber industry until 1923 when Pacific Electric's lease expired, which was not renewed, and the pier was manually demolished after a few years as the lumber industry phased out
- 1916–1928, reinforced concrete "Endless/Pleasure Pier" built by George W. Harding; its 450-foot (140 m) long northern leg stood in the spot previously occupied by Wharf #1, with a 160x200-foot platform at its western terminus, with another 450-foot (140 m) southern leg returning to the shore to form an overall V-shape; damaged by a 1919 storm; condemned for safety reasons in 1928
- 1925–today, wooden "Monstad Pier" built by Captain Hans C. Monstad for fishing/pleasure boat landings; originally 300 feet (91 m) long, extended to 400 feet (120 m) in 1937, and 50 feet (15 m) wide in 1938
- 1929–1988, wooden "Horseshoe Pier" built after demolition of the Endless/Pleasure Pier; destroyed by a fire

=== Late 1900s ===
In 1983, the western end of the Monstad Pier was connected to the central platform of the Horseshoe Pier.

From 1988–1995, the southern Y-shaped remnant of the Horseshoe pier that survived the fire remained open to the public. A smaller portion of the northern end remained closed to the public for safety reasons, and was eventually removed completely when the new, concrete version was built.

The City of Redondo Beach hosted a formal "Launching" ceremony to announce the pier's reconstruction on July 29, 1993. The 1993 plans initially allowed for a carousel, wax museum, aquarium, and at least three new restaurants; however, only one new restaurant was added to the deck, and the rest has remained open to pedestrian traffic.

A formal City of Redondo Beach ceremony opened the new-restored Redondo Beach Pier, on February 11, 1995. Dogs are not allowed on the pier.

== 1995 description ==
1993 municipal pier reconstruction perspective drawing by the City of Redondo Beach, California Engineering Department

The following "Pier Facts" were listed in the February 11, 1995, souvenir brochures distributed at the Redondo Beach ceremony opened the new-restored Redondo Beach Pier:

- The Redondo Beach Pier is 70,000 square feet (6,500 m^{2}) in size
- Sits 25 feet (7.6 m) above the water
- Has over 3,000 cubic yards (2,300 m^{3}) of 6,000 P.S.I. concrete decking
- Has 202 concrete piles, the longest being 120 feet (37 m) in length
- Required 5 years to commence construction and 18 months to complete
- Required over 150,000 man-hours of labor
- Is the largest "endless" pier on the California Coast
- Is the seventh Municipal Pier to be constructed on the shores of Redondo Beach

== Filming location ==
The Redondo Beach Pier was used as a primary filming location for the popular TV series, The O.C..

The Redondo Beach Pier was also used as a filming location for the popular TV series, Riptide from 1984–1986.

The Redondo Beach Pier was also used as a filming location in Big Momma's House 2.

The Redondo Beach Pier was also used as a filming location in the remake of the show 90210 with Trevor Donovan.
