= Redondo Junction, California =

Major Amtrak maintenance facility, Los Angeles

Coordinates: 34°1′13″N 118°13′29″W

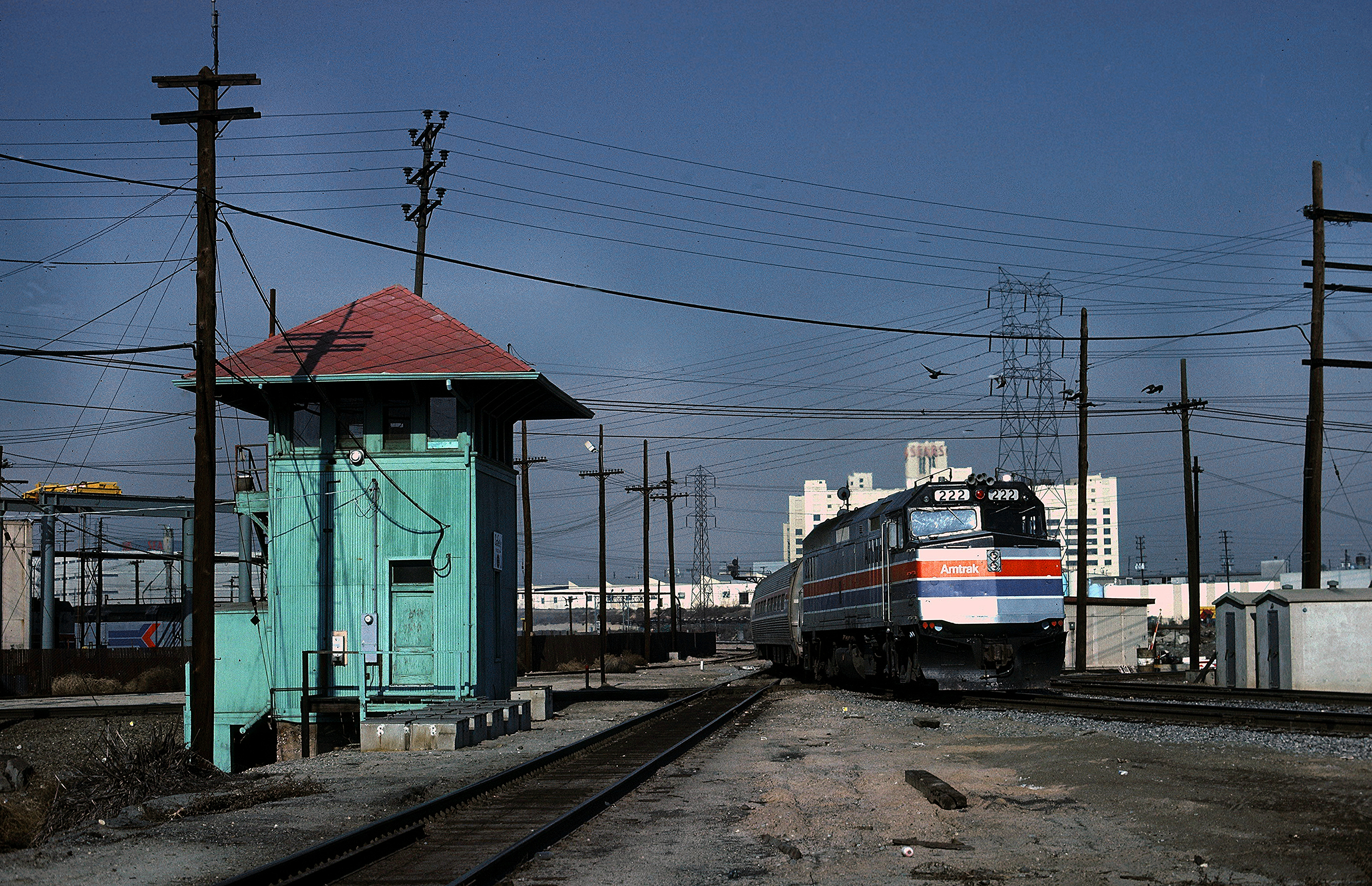
Amtrak 222 southbound at Redondo Junction in 1978

Redondo Junction, California is the site of an Amtrak maintenance facility. It is located 3.5 miles (5.6 km) south of Los Angeles Union Station, southwest of Boyle Heights near Washington Boulevard and the Los Angeles River.

Redondo Junction services Amtrak's long distance trains: Southwest Chief, Coast Starlight, Sunset Limited and Texas Eagle, and the regional train the Pacific Surfliner.

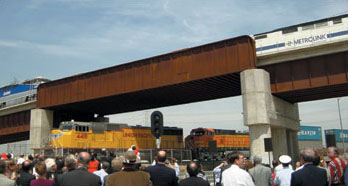
The Redondo Junction project separates passenger rail from freight rail by elevating Amtrak and Metrolink railroad lines over the Alameda Corridor in Los Angeles.

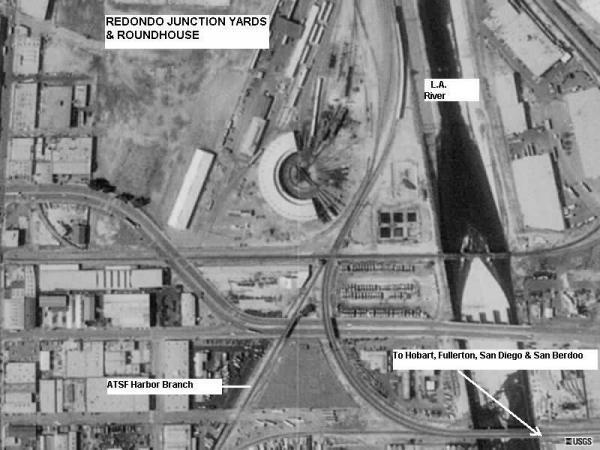
Aerial view of Redondo Junction including roundhouse

== History ==
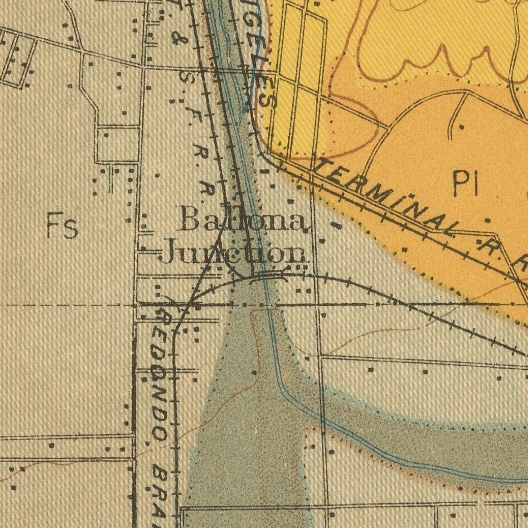
Redondo Junction was sometimes called Ballona Junction in the 19th century

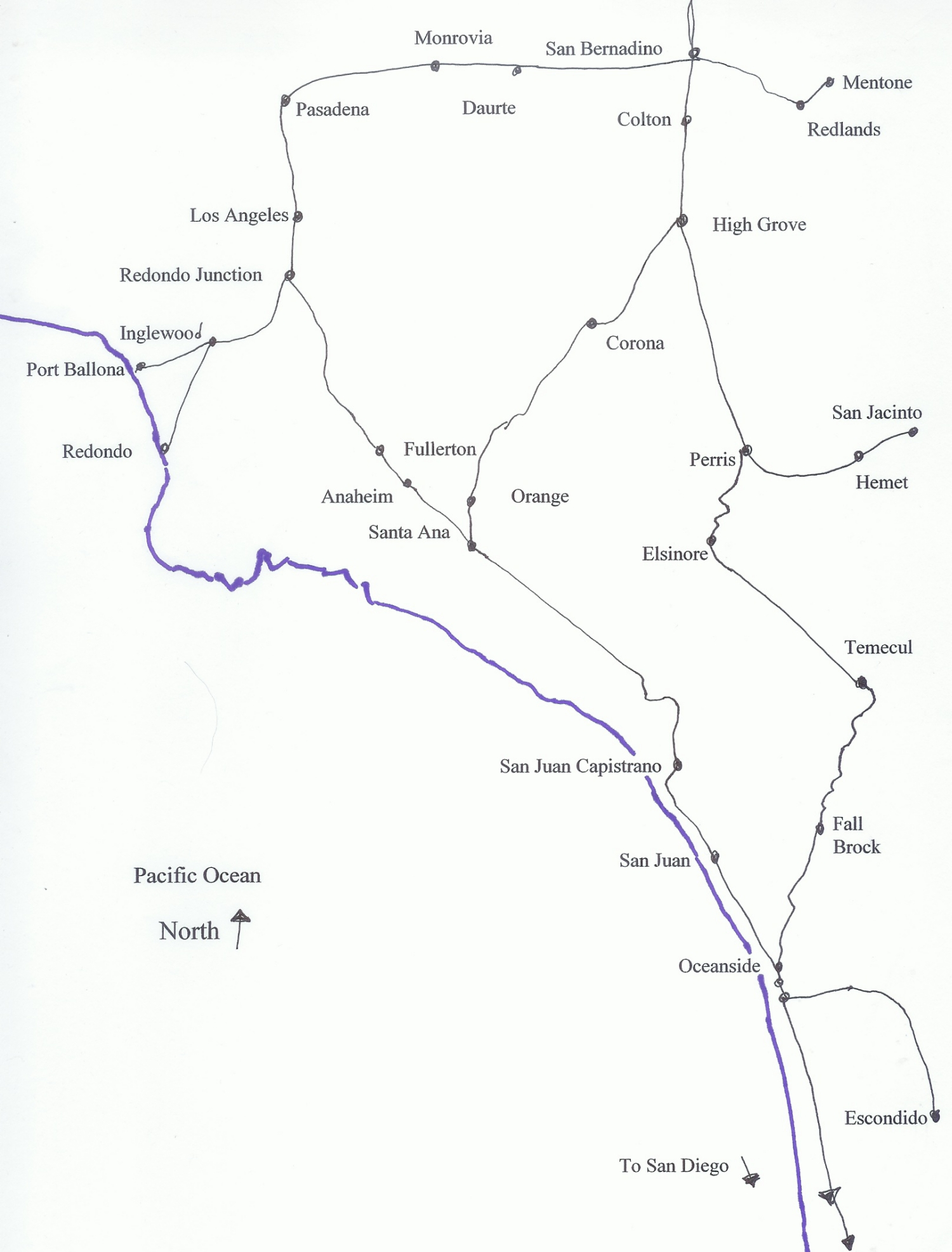
California Central Railway - Santa Fe 1888 rail map

The California Central Railway built and ran a 13-mile line from Port Ballona (what is now Playa del Rey, Los Angeles) to Redondo Junction. The line opened in September 1887. Redondo Junction became a major train maintenance facility. The California Central Railway ran a line from Redondo Junction to Los Angeles-La Grande Station.

The Redondo Beach Railway also connected to Redondo Junction. The Redondo Beach Railway was incorporated in April 1888, Henry E. Huntington controlled and owned much of the Redondo Beach Railway. The Redondo Beach Railway line started operations on September 1, 1888. The California Central Railway operated on, but did not own the Railway. This line ran 11 miles (18 km) from Redondo Beach to Inglewood, California.

In 1890, the Hotel Redondo opened. The rail line helped make Redondo "the place" for tourists. The first train ran on April 16, 1888, from Inglewood to downtown Los Angeles on California Central Railway tracks through Redondo Junction.

The California Central Railway completed a line started by the San Bernardino and San Diego Railway. The line ran from Redondo Junction to Orange and continued to Anaheim, San Juan Capistrano and then to Oceanside and San Diego. The Pacific Surfliner still runs on this line from San Diego to Santa Ana.

On November 7, 1889, California Central Railway was consolidated into the Southern California Railway Company. On June 30, 1888, it started operations as a subsidiary of the Atchison, Topeka and Santa Fe Railway. In 1914 Santa Fe built a 25-track roundhouse there to service trains. The railway turntable was a 120-foot (37 m) through plate girder design.

The Redondo Junction train wreck came on January 22, 1956. It was a deadly wreck involving the Santa Fe RDCs. It was the first major disaster in the Los Angeles area covered on live television, and the worst train wreck in the city's history. The train comprised two RDCs (Budd Rail Diesel Cars) which ran two return trips daily on the San Diegan (train numbers 80-83) between the more conventional streamliners. The RDCs overturned on a sharp curve near the tower, killing 30 and injuring 117.

Redondo Junction was sold to Amtrak in January 1977. In May 1999, Amtrak built new facilities just north of the 1914 roundhouse. The 1914 roundhouse was demolished in August 2000 to make space for a future servicing area. The railway turntable is still on the site.

== Redondo Junction project ==
In 2002 the Redondo Junction project was completed. The project separates passenger rail from freight rail by elevating Amtrak and Metrolink railroad lines over the Alameda Corridor in Los Angeles at Redondo Junction.

== See also ==
- Junction (rail)
- List of California railroads
- History of rail transportation in California
- Southern Transcon
- Pacific Electric's Red Cars that connected with the rail lines.
  - Venice–Inglewood Line
- Santa Fe 3751
- David B. Jones Special
- Beach Cities Greenway on old Redondo Branch
