= Port Los Angeles =

Port Los Angeles can refer to either:

- Port Los Angeles Long Wharf (Santa Monica) 1894 to 1933
- Port of Los Angeles at San Pedro Bay
