= Gwethalyn Jones =

American philanthropist

- Born: August 18, 1880; Chicago, Illinois, US
- Died: June 19, 1959 (age 78); Lake Forest, Illinois, US
- Occupation: Philanthropist
- Parent: David B. Jones
- Relatives: Thomas Davies Jones (uncle); Edward H. Bennett (brother-in-law)

Gwethalyn Jones (August 18, 1880 – June 19, 1959) was an American philanthropist. She made large donations to Princeton University, and to Chicago charities. She was the first president of the Three Arts Club of Chicago.

== Early life and education ==
Jones was born in Chicago, the daughter of David Benton Jones and Nora Bayley Jones. Her father was a zinc manufacturer, born in Wales. Her uncle was Thomas Davies Jones. Her sister Catherine married Chicago architect and city planner Edward H. Bennett.

== Philanthropy and clubwork ==
In 1927, Jones made several large donations to Princeton University, to establish professorships in mathematics, chemistry and physics. In 1929, she made further gifts to Princeton to build Fine Hall (now Jones Hall), a new building for the mathematics department. Also in 1929, she gave $25,000 to the Frank Billings Clinic Fund at the University of Chicago. She gave $10,000 to the Virginia Museum of Fine Arts in 1939. In the 1930s she donated $750,000 to Chicago Children's Memorial Hospital, to create a clinic named for her uncle. In 1946 she hosted a fashion show fundraiser at her Lake Forest home, to benefit the same hospital.

Jones was the first president of the Three Arts Club of Chicago, a women's arts organization that offered respectable lodging to young women artists and art students. She was a competitive amateur golfer, as a member of the Onwentsia Club. She was a governing member of the Art Institute of Chicago, and on the board of directors of the Chicago City Opera Company.

== Personal life ==
Jones had three homes, including "Pepper Hill", a home with notable gardens in Montecito, California, and a townhouse in Chicago. She died in 1959, at the age of 78, at her summer home in Lake Forest.
