= Southern California Railway =

Railway company (1889–1906)

The Southern California Railway was formed on November 7, 1889, by the consolidation of the California Southern Railroad Company, the California Central Railway Company, and the Redondo Beach Railway Company.

A second consolidation and reforming of the Southern California Railway was done on June 27, 1892, merging the existing Southern California Railway Company with the Santa Fe and Santa Monica Railway and the San Bernardino & Eastern Railway.

On May 1, 1899, the Southern California Railway took control of the Elsinore, Pomona and Los Angeles Railway.

All of the lines of the Southern California Railway Company were deeded to the Atchison, Topeka and Santa Fe Railway Company on January 17, 1906.

== San Bernardino and Eastern Railway ==
The San Bernardino and Eastern Railway was chartered on August 11, 1890, to build a rail line from the city of San Bernardino via Highland to connect with the Southern California Railway Company at or near its terminus in San Bernardino County, connecting at Mentone, with rail tracks built to that point in 1887 under the charter of the San Bernardino Valley Railway Company.

== Santa Fe and Santa Monica Railway ==
The Santa Fe and Santa Monica Railway Company was chartered to build from a point at or near Mesmer Station on the line of the Southern California Railway Company between Inglewood and Port Ballona (what is now Playa del Rey, Los Angeles), to Santa Monica. This franchise and its track were sold on March 21, 1902, to Los Angeles Pacific Railroad Company, including the rail line from Inglewood to near Mesmer Station built under charter of the Los Angeles and Santa Monica Railroad Company.

== Kite-Shaped Track ==
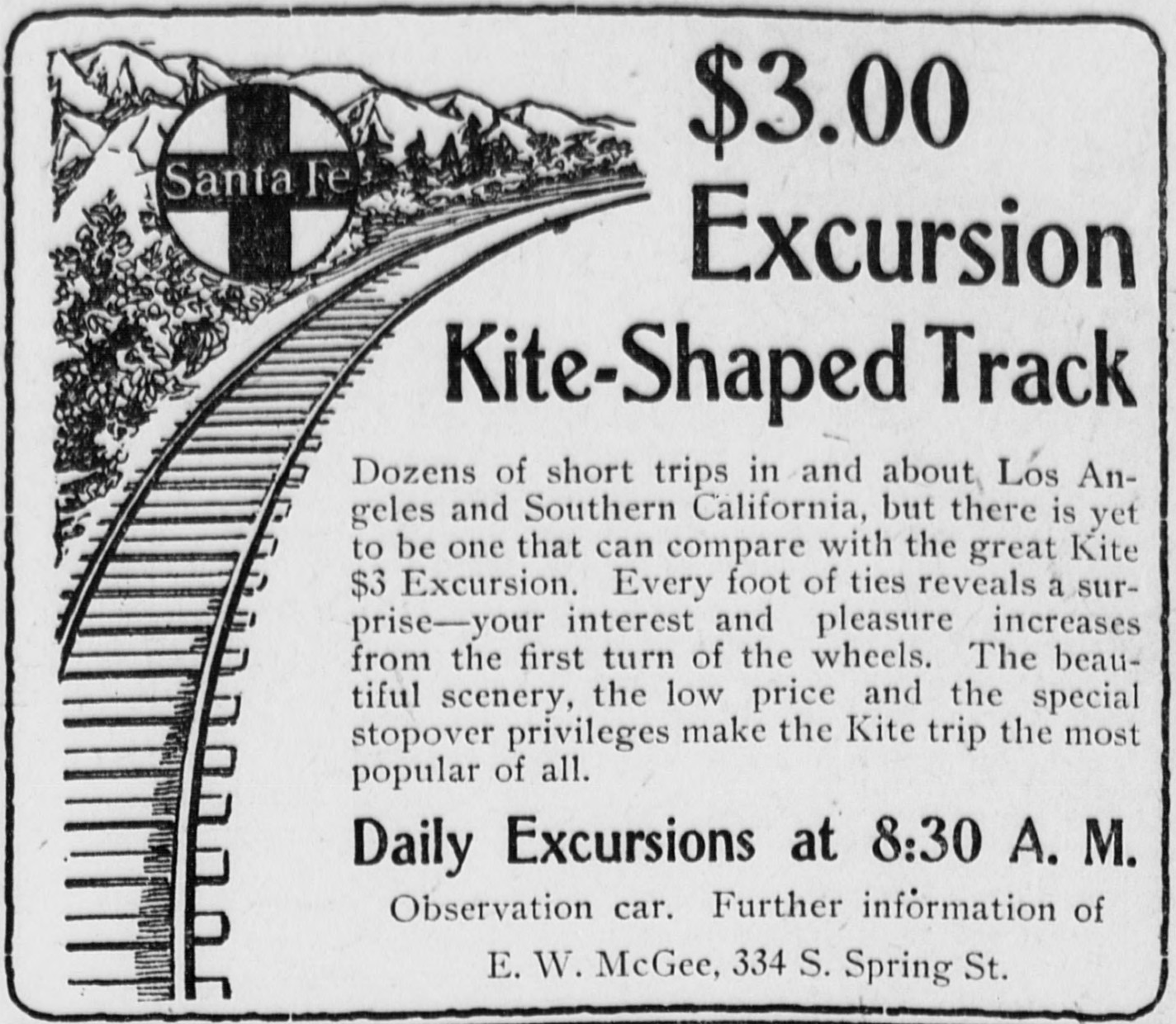
Advertisement for Kite-Shaped Track excursions, 1907

In March 1892, the Southern California Railway began promoting excursions on what they named the "Kite-Shaped Track", a figure-eight route, (Note: The name was likely inspired by a similarly-shaped horse race track configuration popular in the late 19th century.) allowing for scenic day trips among several Southern California communities in the vicinity of Los Angeles and San Bernardino. Santa Fe continued promoting "Kite Excursions" until about 1917.

== Elsinore, Pomona and Los Angeles Railway ==
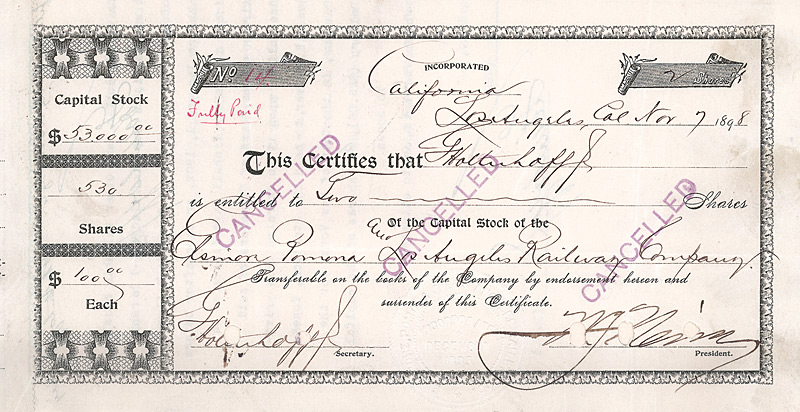
Share of the Elsinore, Pomona & Los Angeles Railway dated November 7, 1898

The Elsinore, Pomona And Los Angeles Railway Company was chartered on December 6, 1895, to build from Lake Elsinore in Riverside County, in a northwesterly direction by way of Pomona to Azusa, in Los Angeles County, with a branch from Pomona to Lordsburg College. Construction was only completed from Elsinore Junction on the line of the Southern California Railway to Alberhill, a total of 7.8 miles. This rail line was deeded to the Southern California Railway Company on May 1, 1899.

== See also ==
- List of California railroads
- History of rail transportation in California
- Cajon Pass
- Southern Transcon
- Union Station (Los Angeles)
- Pacific Electric's Red Cars, which connected with the rail lines
- Santa Fe 3751
- David B. Jones Special
