= Long Wharf (Santa Monica) =

California historical landmark

Site of Port Los Angeles Long Wharf
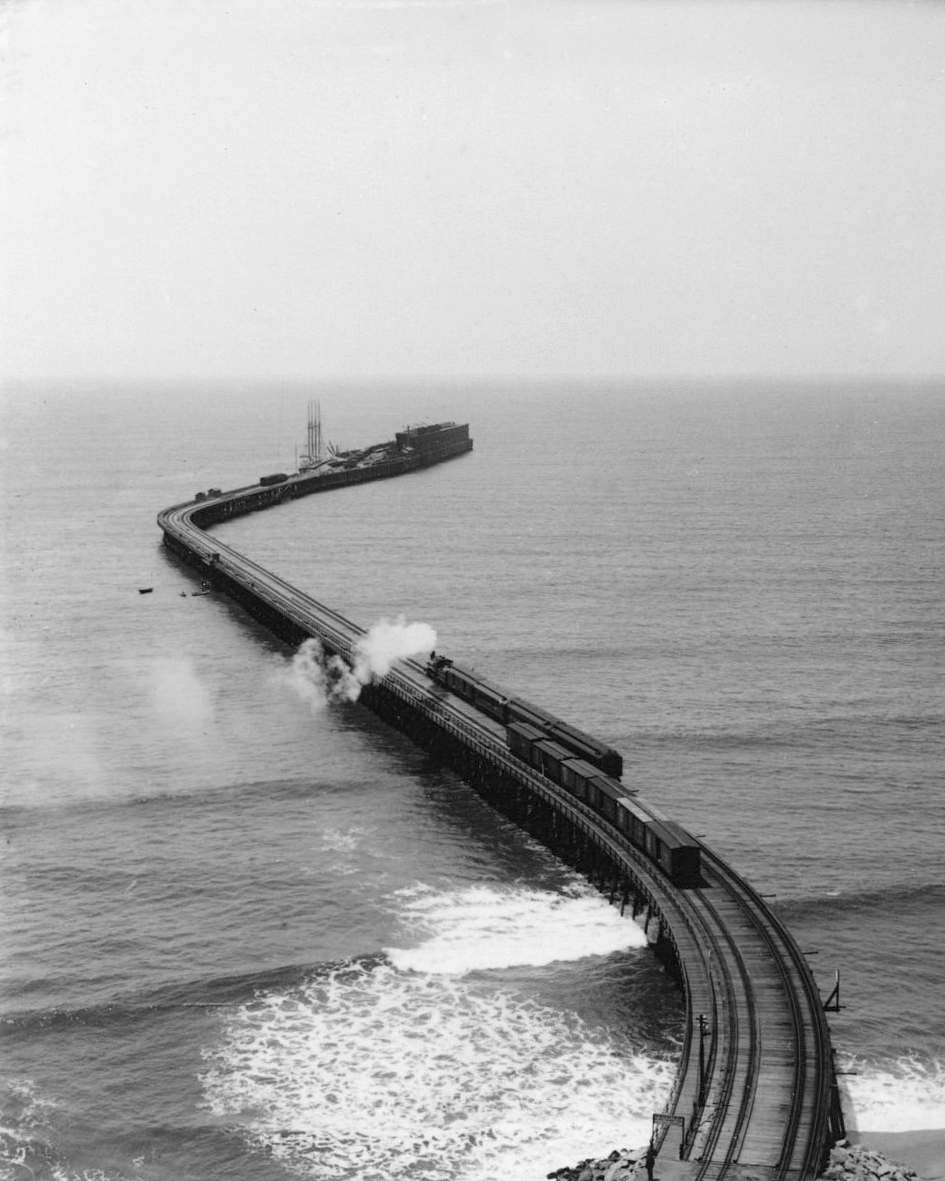
- Trains on wharf, c. 1890s
- Coordinates: 34°1′52″N 118°31′37″W
- Built: 1894

California Historical Landmark
- Designated: May 9, 1975
- Reference no.: 881

The Long Wharf in Santa Monica, also known as Port Los Angeles or the Mile Long Pier, was an extensive pier wharf constructed by the Southern Pacific Railroad Company in Santa Monica Bay from 1892 to 1894. When it opened in 1894, it was the longest wharf in the world, measuring approximately 4,700 feet (1,400 m). It served as a cargo and passenger port until 1913, and in 1919 removal of the wharf started. The wharf, the 1,000 foot (300 m) tip of the pier, was removed by 1915. The remaining 3,600 feet (1,100 m) of pier was used as a run down fishing pier until 1933, when the remainder of the pier was removed. One of the major imports to the wharf was lumber from Northern ports, to help in the construction boom in Southern California. Southern Pacific Railroad and the street cars of the Los Angeles Pacific Railroad served the wharf. Los Angeles Pacific Railroad ran passenger trams to the wharf and from midnight to sunrise ran cargo cars.

The site of the Port Los Angeles Long Wharf is a California Historical Landmark, site number 881. The wharf was north of the current Santa Monica Pier. Today, no trace remains of the pier. The current site of the Long Wharf is now Pacific Palisades and the California State Route 1, at the Will Rogers State Beach lifeguard headquarters. A Historical Landmark monument plaque is at the site, along with a few feet of track.

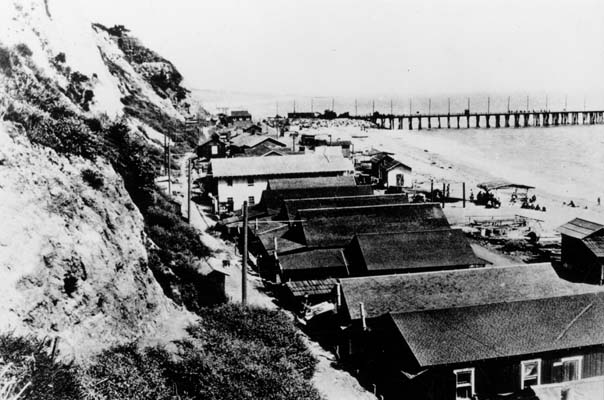
Long Wharf in Santa Monica, 1900

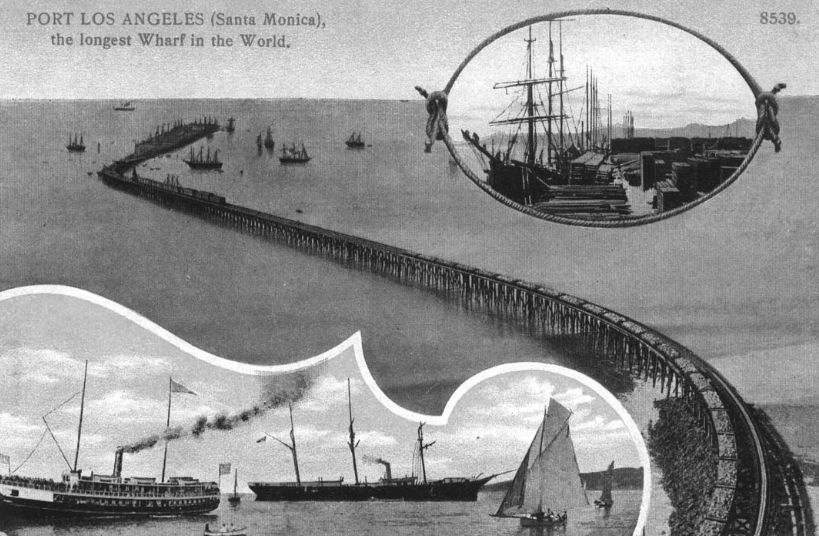
Port Los Angeles Santa Monica 1894

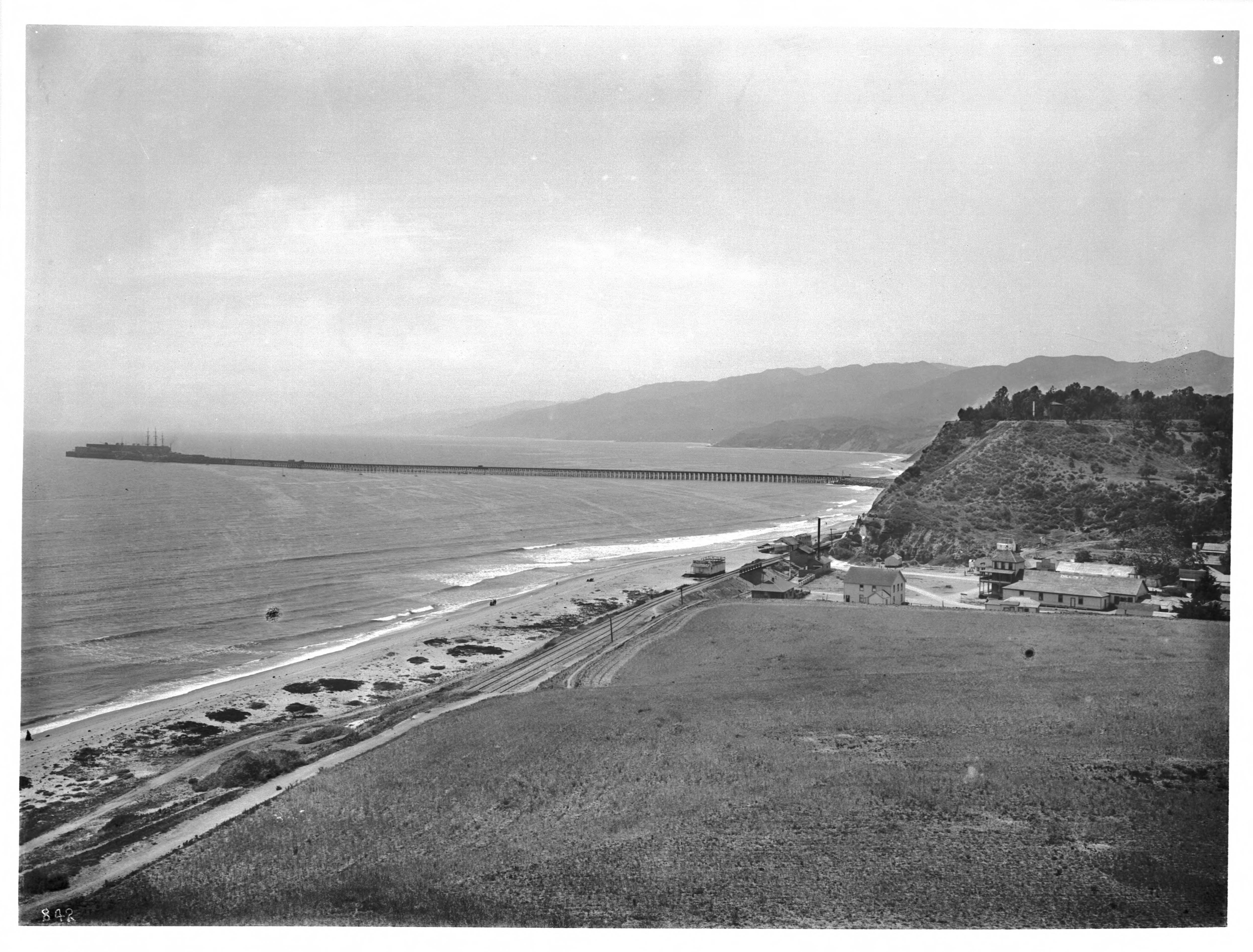
Santa Monica Canyon and Long Wharf of Port of Los Angeles, c. 1900

== History ==
Los Angeles lacked a natural harbor when the Southern Pacific Railroad and Collis P. Huntington wanted to create Port Los Angeles at Santa Monica. Huntington partnered with Nevada Senator John P. Jones, the founder of Santa Monica, to build a 1 mile (1,600 m) long pier wharf into the Pacific Ocean just north of Santa Monica Canyon. The Pier wharf had a double track rail track lines to move cargo and freight on and off the pier quickly. The pier jutting into the bay was vulnerable to storms. The long wharf diverted some shipping from San Pedro Bay, as it did not have a shallow bottom like San Pedro at that time. The political power of Jones and Huntington was used to slow the start of the breakwater construction at San Pedro Bay, while they campaigned for breakwater in Santa Monica bay. The Los Angeles Times publisher Harrison Gray Otis and U.S. Senator Stephen White pushed for federal support to build the Port of Los Angeles at San Pedro Bay. The Free Harbor Fight was settled when San Pedro was endorsed in 1897 by a commission headed by Rear Admiral John Grimes Walker (who later became chair of the Isthmian Canal Commission in 1904). With US government support, breakwater construction began in 1899 in San Pedro and the Los Angeles Harbor Commission was founded in 1907. San Pedro Bay port area was annexed to Los Angeles in 1909. The Santa Monica wharf thus lost much of its traffic to San Pedro. Santa Monica almost became as important as the Port of Los Angeles in San Pedro as major shipping port. Political struggle between the Los Angeles Chamber of Commerce and the Southern Pacific Railroad put an end to the Santa Monica wharf.

== Early port rail lines ==
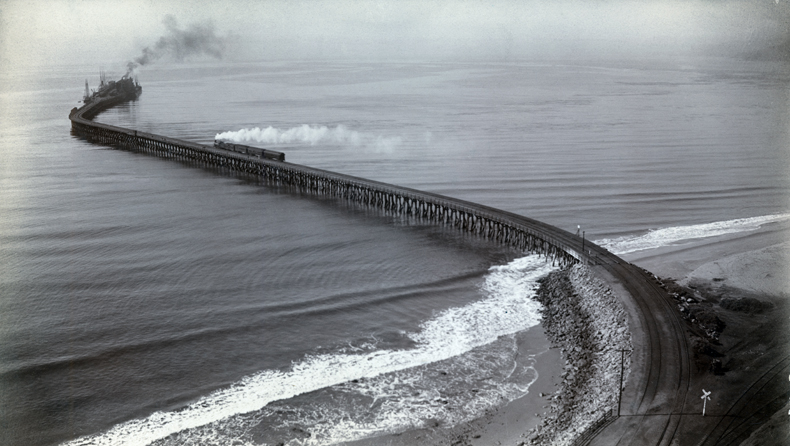
Southern Pacific's train on the Long Wharf, 1895

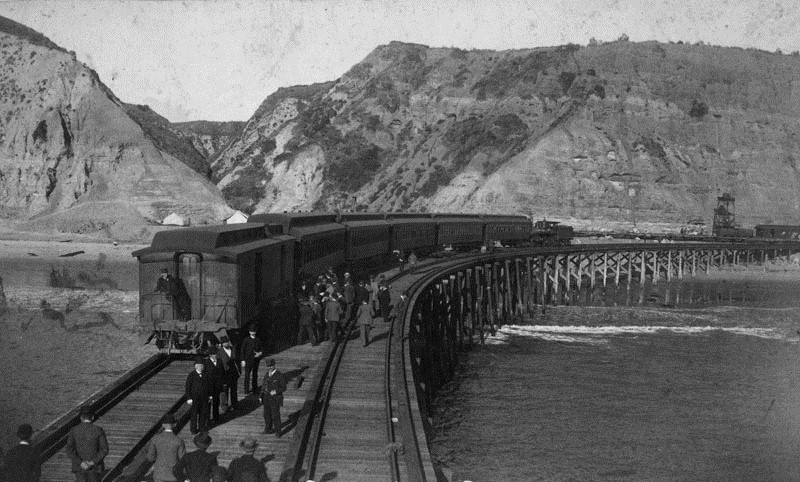
Southern Pacific's train on the Long Wharf, 1890

The Los Angeles and Independence Railroad was a key to its early success. The very steep coastal palisades in Santa Monica, made rail access limited giving Southern Pacific's trains a monopoly to the oceanfront land and to the wharf. The wharf was also served by the Los Angeles Pacific Railroad's street cars and was one of the stops on the Balloon Route. The tram line to the Wharf was called the Santa Monica Canyon Line built in 1891. This tram line was an extension of the Santa Monica Air Line. It ran from Ocean Ave & Colorado Ave down a tunnel to the beach. In July 1911 Pacific purchased the line till closure on August 22, 1933.

=== Santa Monica Local Line ===
The Santa Monica Local Line was a small local streetcar line that served the Wharf and connected to the Santa Monica Air Line in Santa Monica.

- Port Ballona made by Louis Mesmer and Moye Wicks (today's Marina Del Rey) was serviced by the California Central Railway. Opened in September 1887, this line later became the Santa Fe Railway (later the Atchison, Topeka, and Santa Fe Railroad). Their plan was to have this be the site of a major port. The rail line ran from the port to Redondo junction A street car tram line was made to the Port by the Redondo & Hermosa Beach Railroad company, this was part of the Los Angeles Pacific Railroad opened in December 1902.
- The Angeles and San Pedro Railroad served the Port of Los Angeles at San Pedro Bay. Two Pacific Electric San Pedro red car lines served San Pedro Bay.

== See also ==
- Streetcar suburb
- Streetcars in North America
- List of California railroads
- History of rail transportation in California
- McClure Tunnel
- Pacific Electric's Red Cars that connected to rail lines, took over the Los Angeles Pacific Railroad later.
- California Historical Landmarks in Los Angeles County, California
- Port of Long Beach
- Hueneme, Malibu and Port Los Angeles Railway (The railroad that the May K. Rindge built through Malibu)

| Preceding station | Southern Pacific Railroad | Following station |
|---|---|---|
| Terminus | Santa Monica Branch | Santa Monica Canyon toward River |
