= David B. Jones =

Welsh-American businessman (1848-1923)

David Benton Jones
- Born: c. 1848; Pembrokeshire, Wales
- Died: August 23, 1923 (aged 74–75)
- Education: Princeton University
- Occupation: Businessman
- Spouse: Nora Bayley Jones
- Children: 3

David Benton Jones (c. 1848 – August 23, 1923) was president and chairman of the board of directors of the Mineral Point Zinc Company and considered a founder of the Zinc industry in America. When ill, he chartered a special train whose speed rivaled the time of the Scott Special.

== Biography ==
"He founded the Mineral Point [Zinc] Company in Wisconsin, which owns the whole town in Wisconsin, about thirty years ago and merged it with the New Jersey Zinc Company in a nationwide organization in 1897."

David Benton Jones had a winter home near Santa Barbara, California, at "Pepper Hill" in Montecito, California. He had a townhouse at 1435 Astor Street in Chicago, Illinois, and a summer house at Lake Forest, Illinois. When he was ill, he chartered a train between Los Angeles, Chicago, and Lake Forest which was a few minutes faster than the Scott Special. David B. Jones also had a house in Florida.

"Mr. Jones was born in Pembrokeshire, South Wales, in 1848. He came to this country as a boy and received his education here, graduating from Princeton University in 1874. He was a close friend of ex-President Wilson."

David B. Jones had three daughters: Gwethalyn Jones, Catherine (Mrs. Edward H. Bennett) Jones, and Winifred Jones and two sons: Owen B. and Herbert Jones.

== Additional sources ==
"David B. Jones, Zinc Capitalist, Passes Away". Chicago Daily Tribune. August 23, 1923. p. 3.

"David Benton Jones Dead. Prominent Capitalist Was Founder of Zinc Industry in America". The New York Times. August 24, 1923. p. 11.

"Social register, summer". Social Register. Social Register Association: 485. April 1913.

"Social register: Contains the summer address where it differs from the winter address of the residents of New York, Washington, Philadelphia, Chicago, Boston, St. Louis, Pittsburgh, Cleveland ... [etc.]. summer ..." Social Register. XXXIII (75). Bowling Green, [KY?]: Social Register Association: 436. Summer 1919.

Wilson, Richard Guy (2002). "The Styles of David Adler". In Thorne, Martha (ed.). David Adler, architect: the elements of style. New Haven, Conn: Yale University Press. pp. 13–33. ISBN 978-0-300-09702-3.

"Zinc Industry Founder Dead. D. B. Jones Passes Away at Lake Forest. Magnate Becomes Ill Here Last May. Was Rushed East on Train That Cost $11,000". The Los Angeles Times. August 24, 1923. p. 16.

== See also ==
Fiedler, George (1997). Mineral Point: A History. Mineral Point, Wisconsin: Memorial Pendarvis Endowment Trust Fund.
