= California Central Railway =

American railroad system (1887–1889)

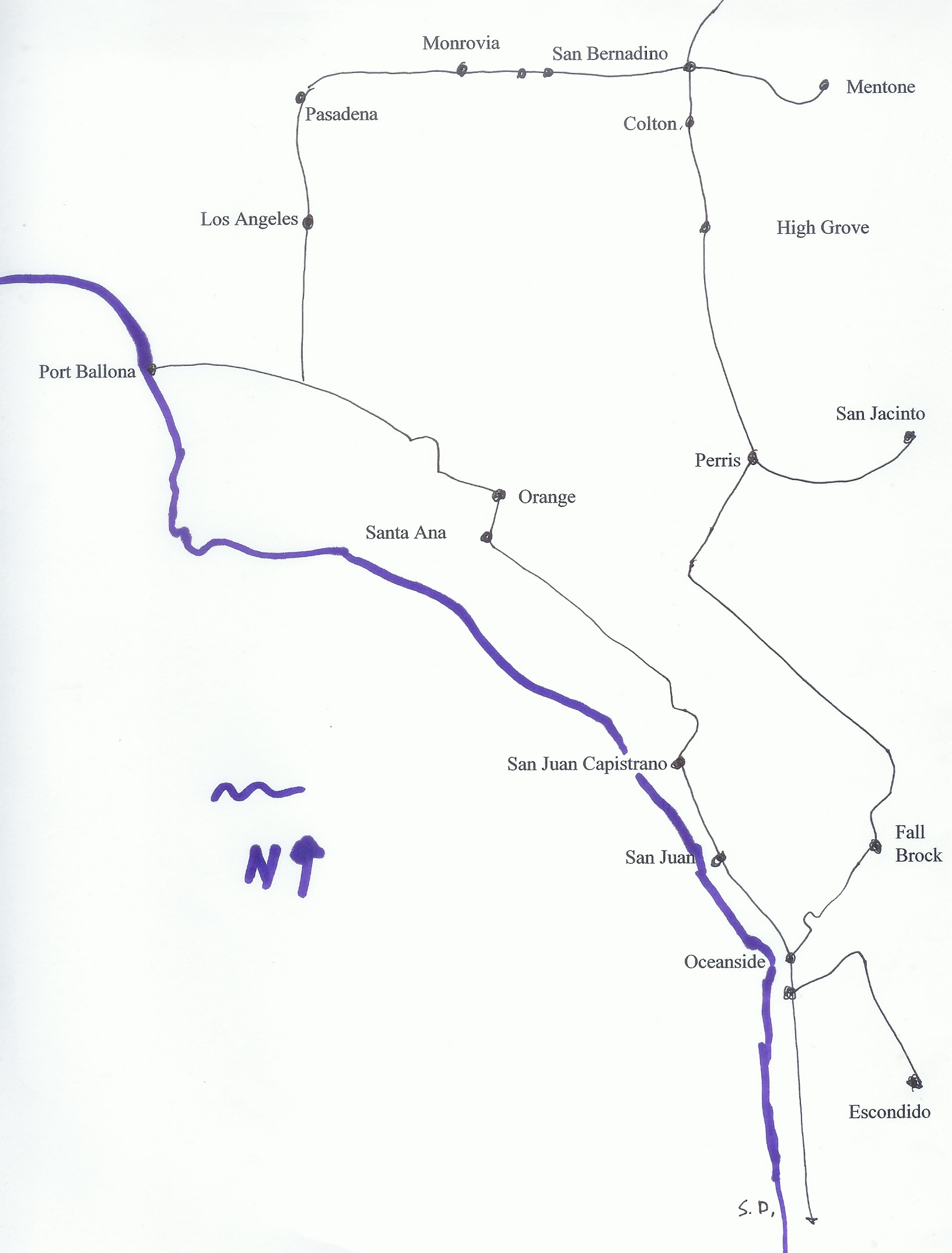
- Map of California Central Railway lines in 1889

Overview
- Headquarters: San Bernardino, California
- Locale: Southern California
- Dates of operation: April 23, 1887–November 7, 1889
- Successor: Atchison, Topeka and Santa Fe Railway

Technical
- Track gauge: 4 ft 8 1/2 in (1,435 mm) standard gauge
- Length: 250 miles (400 km)

The California Central Railway was incorporated on April 23, 1887, with headquarters in San Bernardino, California. George O. Manchester was the President of the corporation.

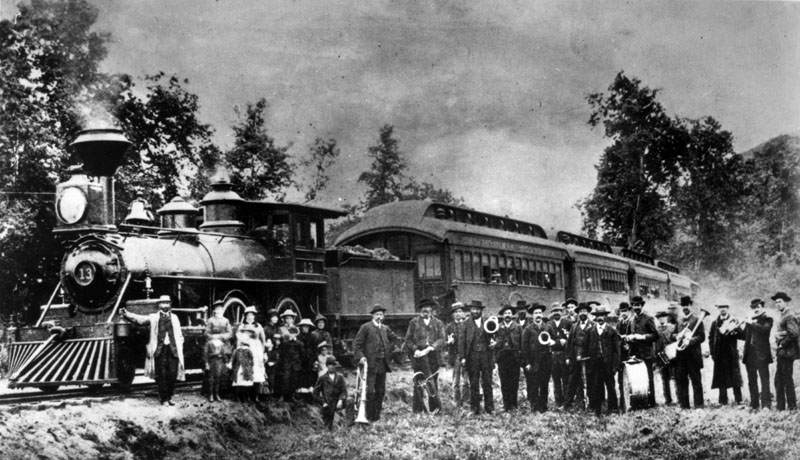
1888 group photo taken in the Arroyo Seco south of Pasadena with locomotive #13, built in 1882 by the Rhode Island Locomotive Works, this locomotive was renumbered 7 in 1889 and scrapped as AT&SF#0109. Photographed on the former Los Angeles and San Gabriel Valley Railroad line.

At its peak it operated 250 miles (400 km) of rail line with 14 steam locomotives, 14 passenger cars and 83 freight cars. It operated rail lines from May 20, 1887, to November 7, 1889. On December 31, 1888, the California Central Railway was valued at $12,914,000.00.

On November 7, 1889, California Central Railway was consolidated with the California Southern Railroad and the Redondo Beach Railway into the Southern California Railway Company. On June 30, 1888, it began operations as a subsidiary of the Atchison, Topeka and Santa Fe Railway.

== Original 1887 lines ==
The California Central Railway mainlines were from San Bernardino to Los Angeles at La Grande Station, Oceanside to Los Angeles; and High Grove to Orange. It also ran a 19-mile (31 km) line in Riverside County between Perris to San Jacinto, from May 1887 to May 1, 1888. California Central Railway also built and ran a 13-mile (21 km) line from Port Ballona (present day Playa del Rey, Los Angeles) on Santa Monica Bay, to Redondo Junction (just southwest of present-day Boyle Heights) at the Los Angeles River near Washington Boulevard, which opened in September 1887. Redondo Junction became a major maintenance facility for trains.

== California Central Railway expansions ==
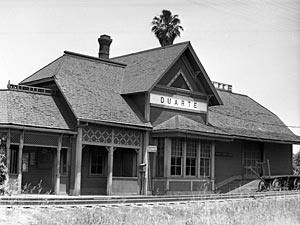
The Duarte train depot built by the California Central Railway in 1897 and sold to Santa Fe in 1907.

=== Redondo Beach Railway ===
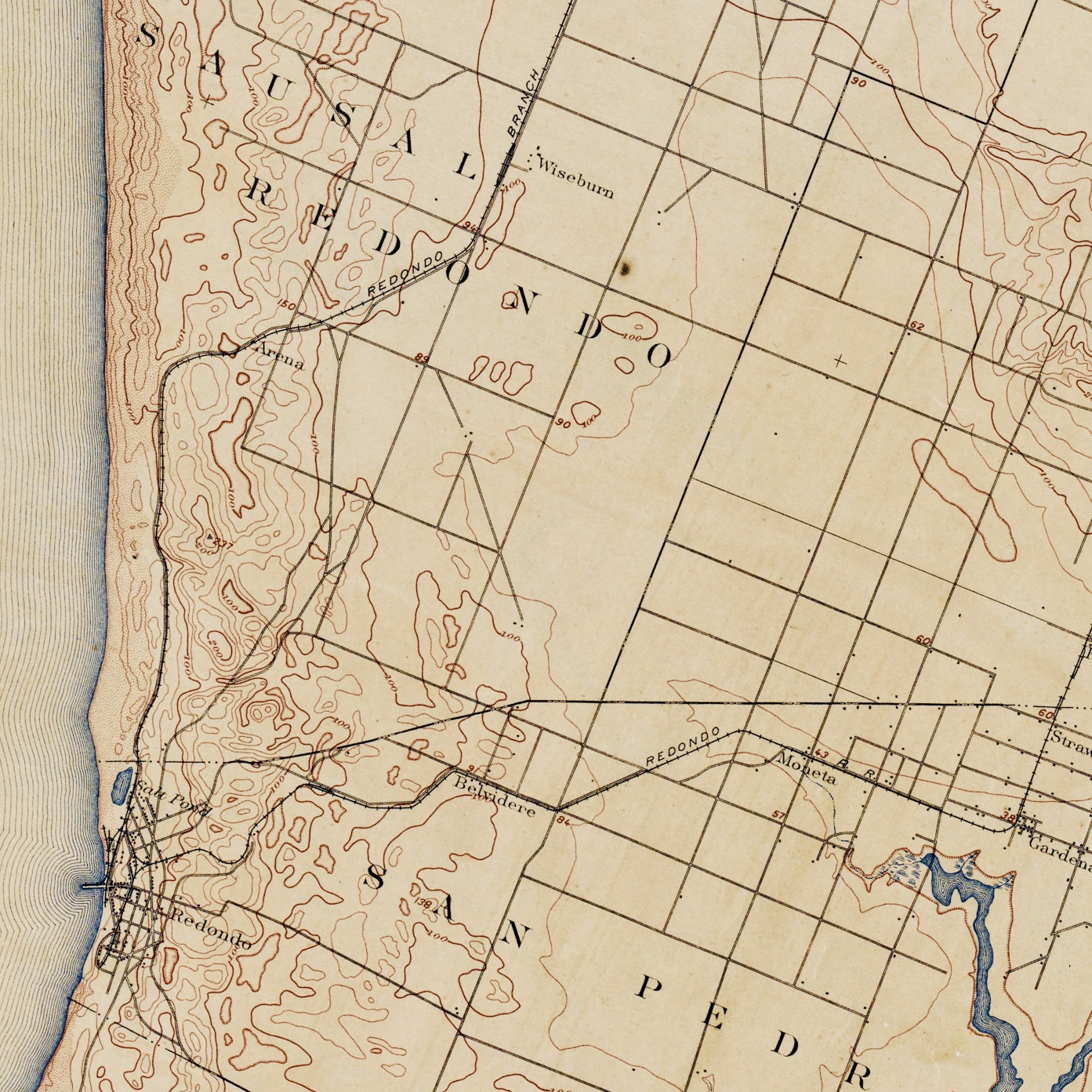
Redondo rail lines in 1894

Redondo Beach Railway was incorporated in April 1888. Redondo Beach Railway first bond sales was on June 1, 1888. Henry E. Huntington controlled and owned much of the Redondo Beach Railway. Line started operation September 1, 1888. California Central Railway operated, but did not own, the 11 miles (18 km) of the Redondo Beach Railway. This line ran from Redondo Beach to Inglewood Depot. In 1890, the Hotel Redondo opened, the rail line help make Redondo "The Place" for tourists. Also stopped at Burwell and Port Ballona. First train was on April 16, 1888. From Inglewood the line continued to downtown Los Angeles on California Central Railway tracks through the Redondo Junction. Redondo Beach Railway company was consolidated into the Southern California Railway on November 7, 1889. When the street car line of the Redondo and Hermosa Beach Railroad opened in 1902, ridership on the Redondo Beach Railway trains dropped.

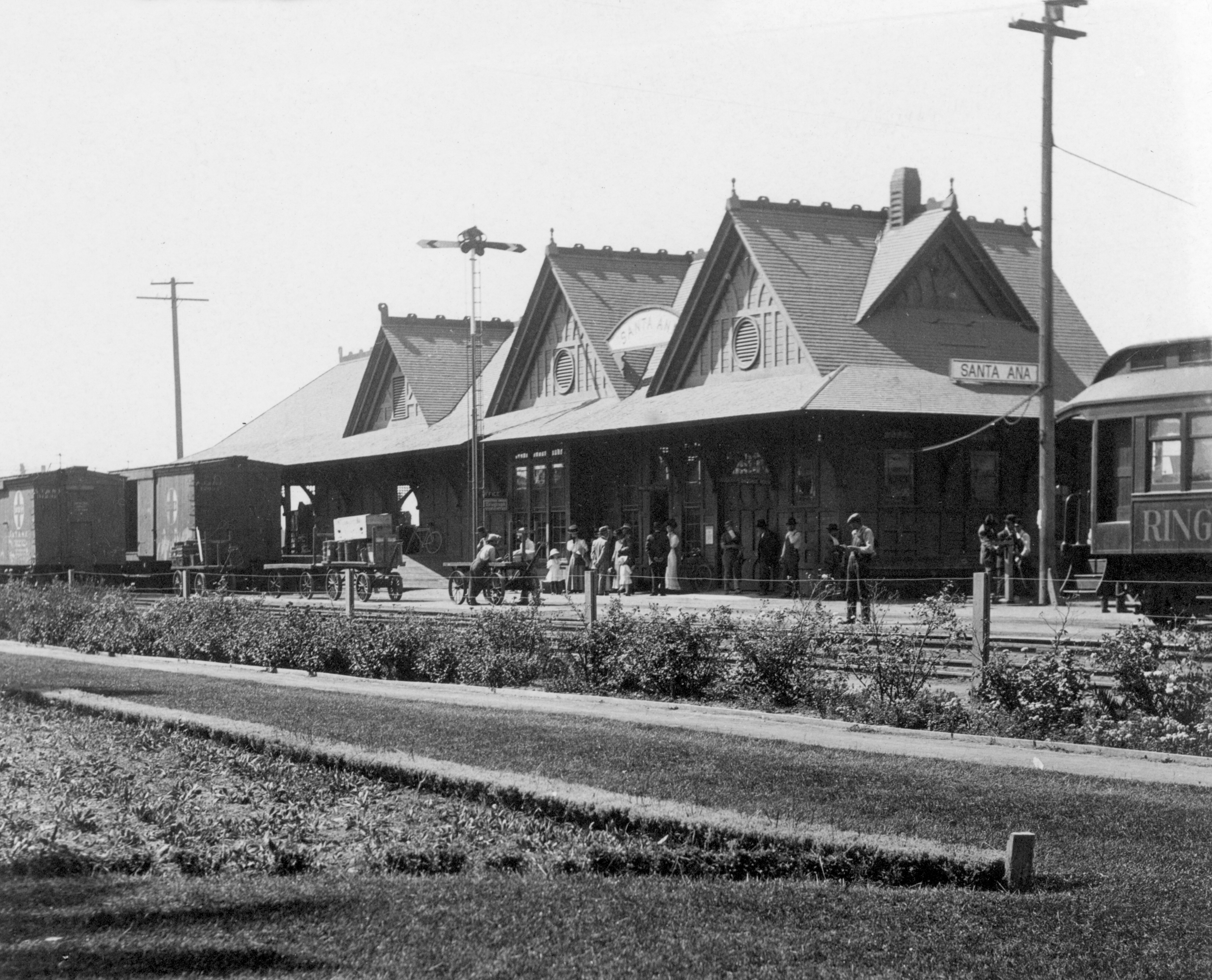
Santa Fe Depot, Santa Ana, 1911

California Central Railway purchased and took control of the following lines

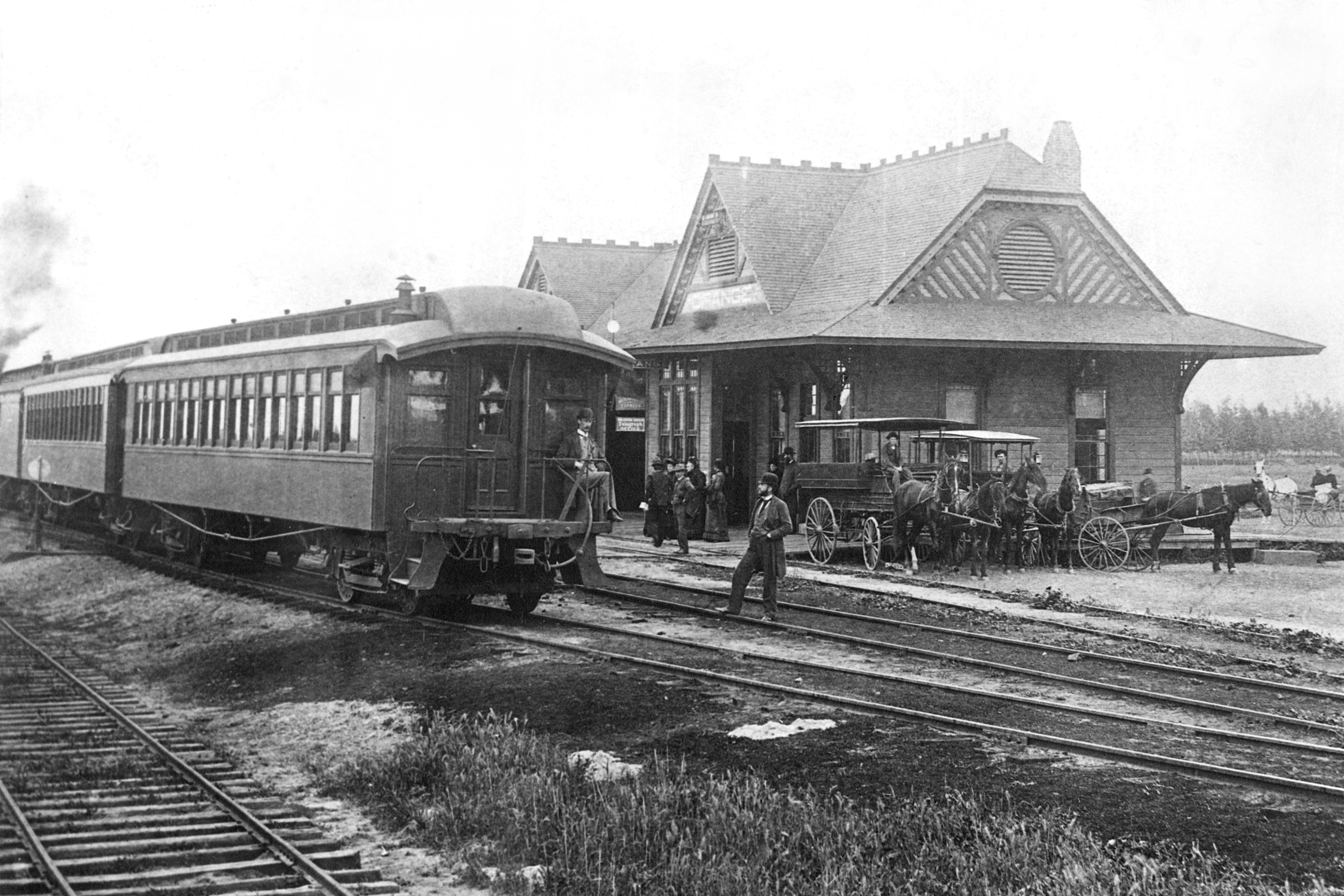
The outside the first Santa Fe Depot in Orange, California, April 23, 1891, at 186 North Atchinson Street, just off of West Chapman Avenue.

=== Riverside, Santa Ana and Los Angeles Railway ===
Riverside, Santa Ana and Los Angeles Railway was incorporated September 29, 1885. California Central Railway expanded and completed the rail line started by the Riverside, Santa Ana and Los Angeles Railway Company, from Santa Ana to Los Angeles on August 12, 1888, 34 miles (55 km). Also completed was the line from High Grove to Orange on September 15, 1887, 41 miles (66 km). (started in 1886)

=== San Bernardino and San Diego Railway ===
San Bernardino and San Diego Railway was incorporated on November 20, 1886, bringing service to San Diego County. The company put up for sale $4,000,000.00 in stock to start construction. A Victorian-style depot was erected in 1887 at the site of current San Diego Union Station. Directors of the company were: George H. Bonebrake, A. W. Francisco and M. L. Wicks. California Central Railway expanded and completed the rail line started by the San Bernardino and San Diego Railway. The 35-mile (56 km) rail line ran from Santa Ana to San Juan (present day San Clemente) on November 30, 1887. Also completed was the 15 mile line from San Juan to Fallbrook Junction on August 12, 1888, 15 miles (24 km), (started 1887). San Bernardino and San Diego Railway was originally chartered to build a line from Anaheim to San Juan Capistrano, and then to Oceanside and to San Diego. The Pacific Surfliner still runs on this line from San Diego to Santa Ana.

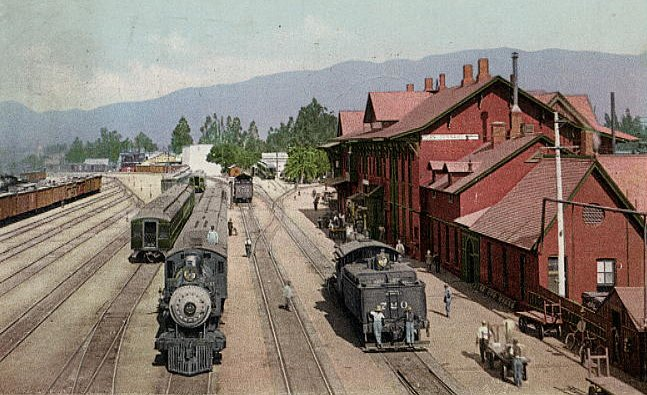
The station and yards at San Bernardino in 1915. A year later, the station was destroyed by fire.

=== San Bernardino & Los Angeles Railway ===
San Bernardino & Los Angeles Railway was incorporated on November 22, 1886. In 1887 the California Central Railway expanded and completed a rail line started by the San Bernardino & Los Angeles Railway Co. from San San Bernardino to Duarte on May 31, 1887, 38 miles (61 km), (started 1887). This line connected with the Los Angeles and San Gabriel Valley Railroad at Duarte. The Los Angeles and San Gabriel Valley Railroad had already secured right of way East of Duarte. Other depots on this line are Claremont and North Pomona. Some towns start at rail stops like: Rialto, North Cucamonga, and North Ontario. Later this line would run the Santa Fe Southwest Chief until 1994.

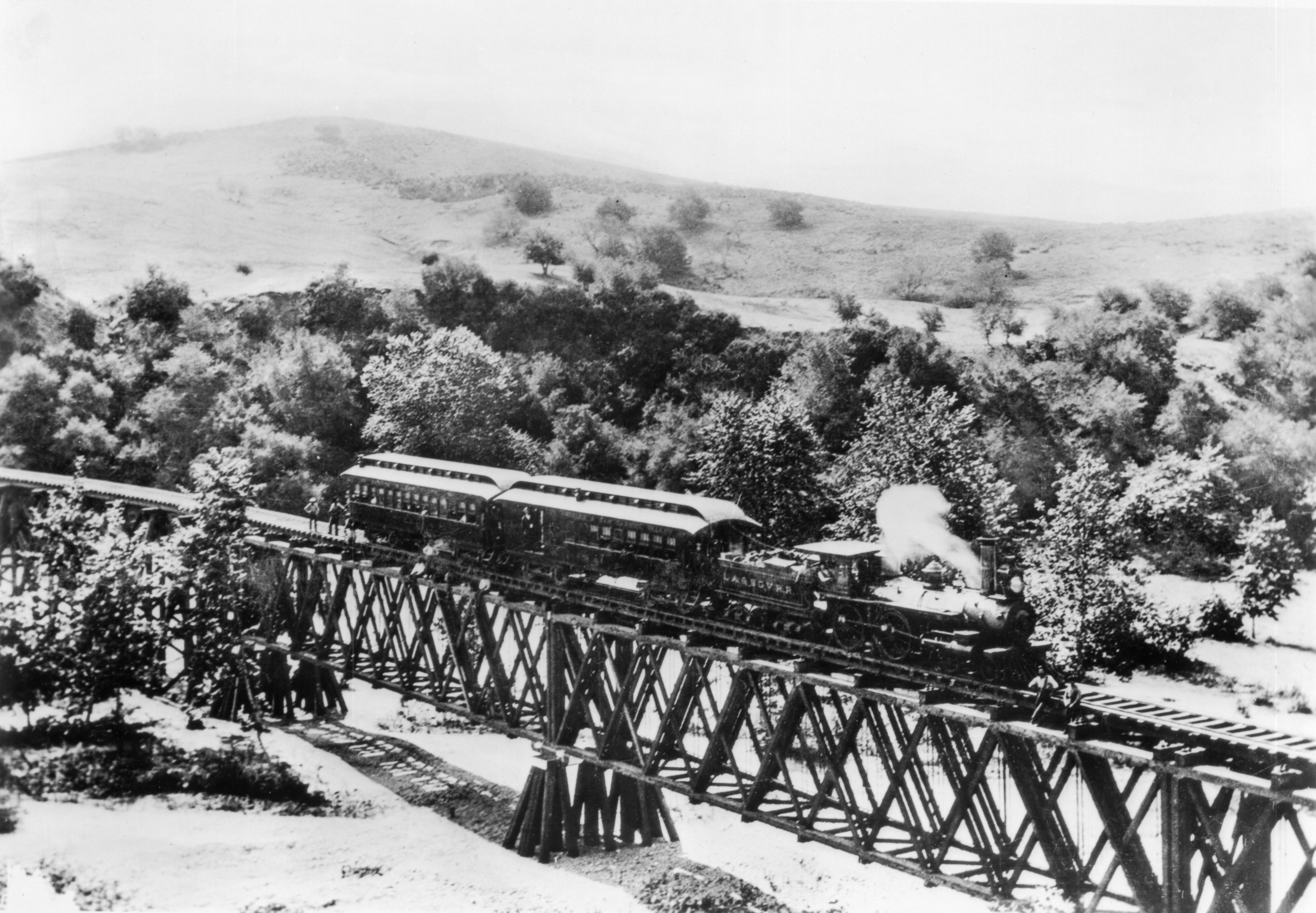
1885 view of the Los Angeles and San Gabriel Railroad crossing the Arroyo Seco near Garvanza - Highland Park

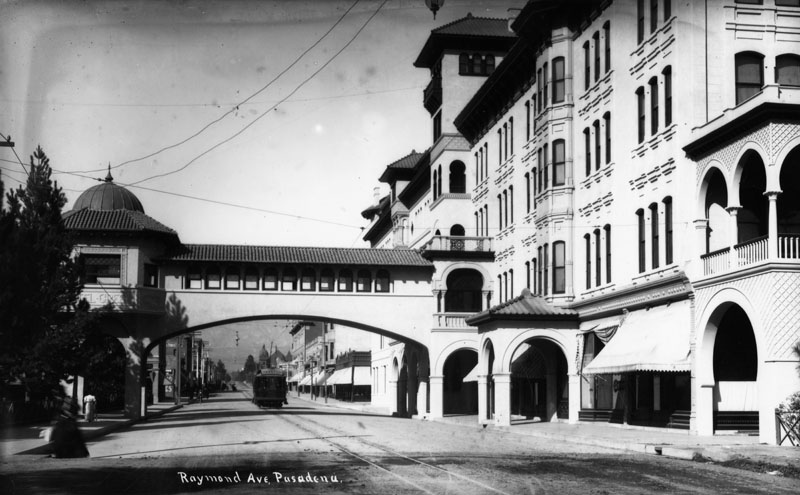
Pasadena Hotel Green, with bridge to the Pasadena rail station.

=== Los Angeles and San Gabriel Valley Railroad ===
Los Angeles and San Gabriel Valley Railroad was incorporated on September 5, 1883. On September 16, 1885 a grand celebration was held in Pasadena for the completion of the Los Angeles and San Gabriel Valley Railroad from downtown Los Angeles to Lamanda Park in East Pasadena. The rail line went from downtown Los Angeles through the Arroyo Seco to Pasadena. The railroad crossed the Arroyo Seco just north of Garvanza in Highland Park. California Central Railway purchased the Los Angeles and San Gabriel Valley Railroad on May 20, 1887, and connected it to the end of the Daurte line to complete a line from San Bernardino to Downtown Los Angeles through the San Gabriel Valley. This gave the line the Azusa, Monrovia, Pasadena and Rancho Santa Anita depots. California Central Railway completed work started East of Daurte. Later this line connected with the San Bernardino & Los Angeles Railway, which later would run the Southwest Chief.

=== San Bernardino Valley Railway ===
San Bernardino Valley Railway was incorporated on January 12, 1887. California Central Railway expanded and completed the rail line started by the San Bernardino Valley Railway Co. from San Bernardino to Mentone, California, on December 31, 1887, 13 miles (21 km). San Bernardino Valley Railway was chartered to build from the City of San Bernardino to near Lugonia (current city is now Redlands in San Bernardino County). The final construction was from San Bernardino to Mentone.

=== San Diego Central Railroad ===
San Diego Central Railroad was incorporated on November 8, 1886. California Central Railway expanded and completed the 21-mile (34 km) rail line in San Diego County started by the San Diego Central Railroad Co., from Escondido junction, (just south of Oceanside) to Escondido. Service began in 1887. San Diego Central Railroad was chartered to build from San Diego Bay north to Poway, Escondido, and Oceanside. However, San Diego Central Railroad only constructed a rail line between Escondido to Oceanside.

=== Los Angeles and Santa Monica Railroad ===
Los Angeles and Santa Monica Railroad was incorporated on January 6, 1886, to build a railroad line from downtown Los Angeles to a depot on the Santa Monica Bay in Los Angeles County. In March 1886, the Los Angeles Herald reported that the "surveyors of the Santa Monica Railroad have just crossed the S.P. track at Ballona, just where the county road crossed that track near La Ballona station. The terminus is finally fixed at South Santa Monica, near where the old Juan Bernard wharf is."

California Central Railway purchased the Los Angeles and Santa Monica Railroad, but the Los Angeles and Santa Monica Railroad company had not started any work on any rail lines, California Central Railway did get needed right of way land. The 18.03 mi (29.02 km) line was opened for business on September 7, 1887, with stops (from northeast to southwest) at Ballona Junction, Nadeau Park, Baldwin, Slauson, Wildeson, Hyde Park, Inglewood, Danville, Mesmer, and Port Ballona. A train left Los Angeles at 9:15 a.m. on the one-hour journey and returned from Port Ballona at 4 p.m.

=== San Jacinto Railway ===
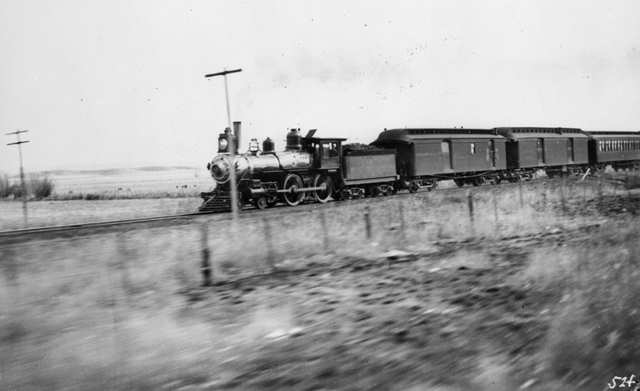
1890, An AT&SF passenger train in operation, c. 1895.

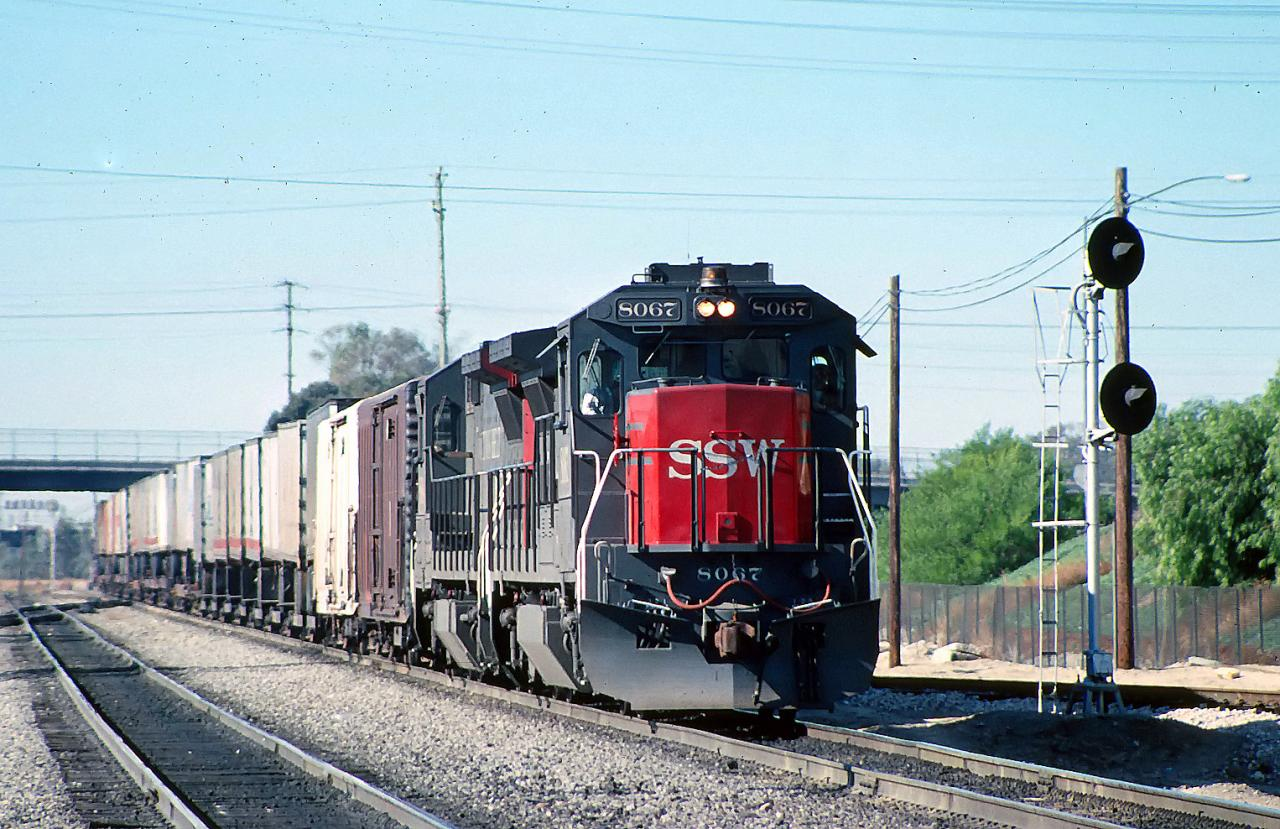
Colton Junction

San Jacinto Railway was incorporated on March 7, 1887, in Riverside County. California Central Railway purchased the San Jacinto Railway, but this company had not started any work on any rail lines, California Central Railway did get needed right of way land. Rail work was started in 1887, this branch rail line ran from Perris to San Jacinto and started operation on May 20, 1888, with the first train arriving at Winchester.

== Santa Fe ==
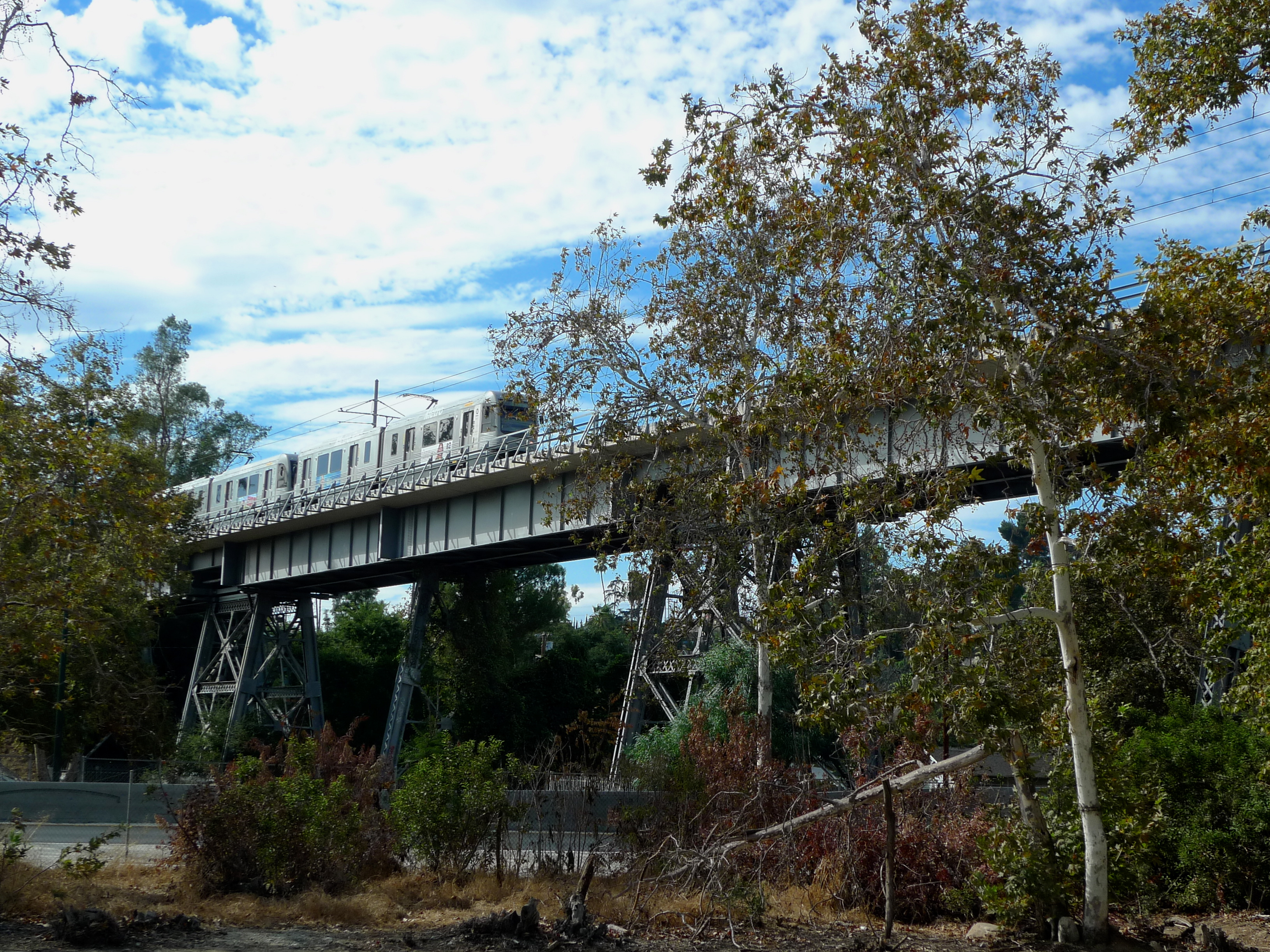
Santa Fe Arroyo Seco Railroad Bridge with a Gold line Tram crossing, this the 3rd bridge at the site of the original 1886 Los Angeles and San Gabriel Valley Railroad bridge

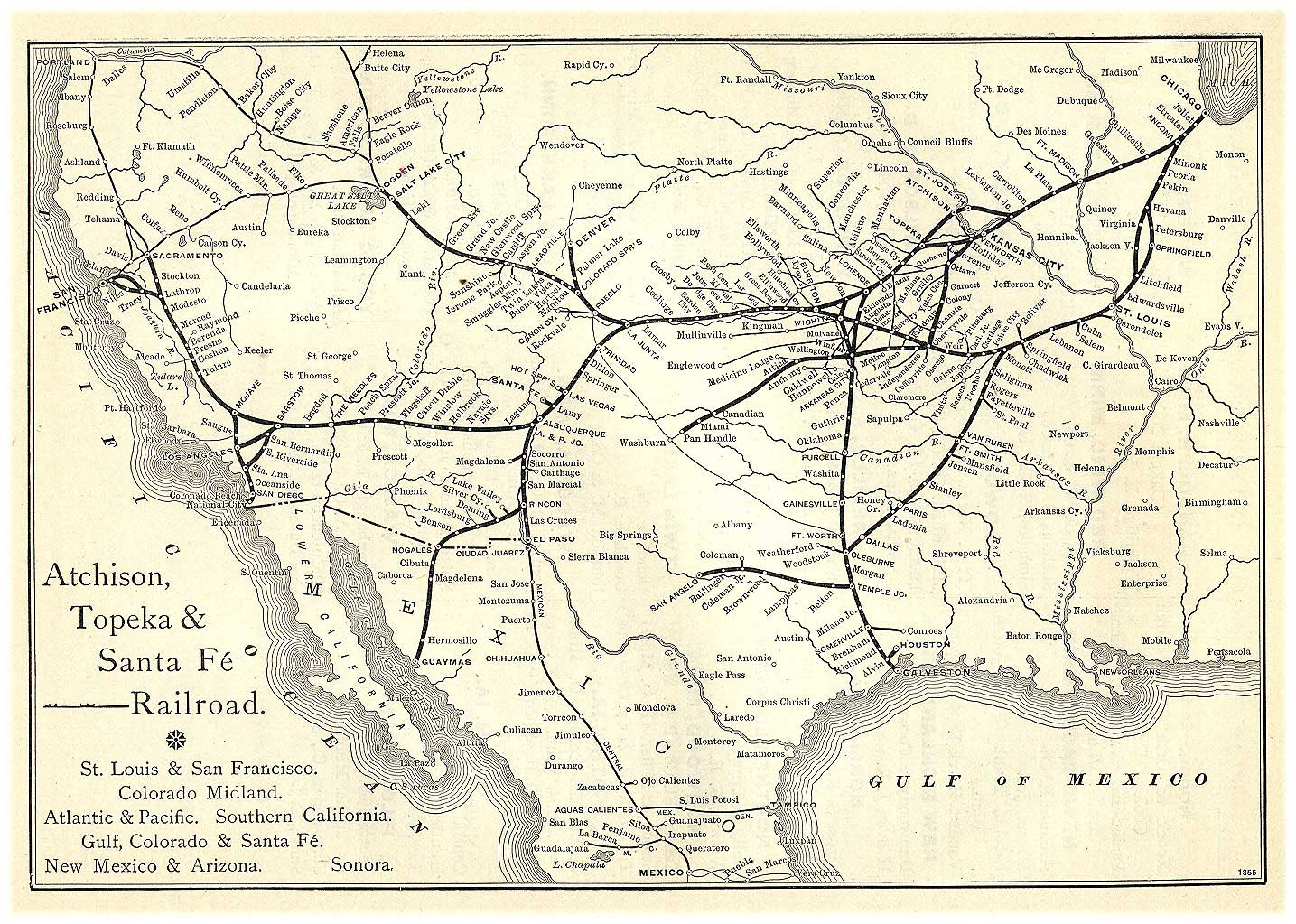
A map of "The Santa Fé Route" and subsidiary lines as published in an 1891 issue of the Grain Dealers and Shippers Gazetteer

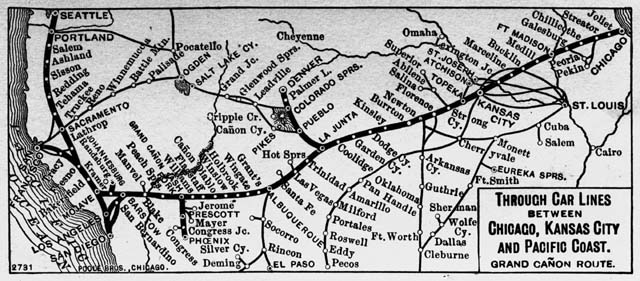
map of the Atchison, Topeka & Santa Fe Railway c. 1901

Jay Gould and Collis Potter Huntington worked hard to keep the Santa Fe Railway out of the LA and the San Gabriel Valley. But in May 1887, the first Santa Fe train rolled into Los Angeles. Santa Fe had an expensive agreement to use Southern Pacific Railroad tracks to run trains on from Colton to Los Angeles. This agreement was used for 1½ years.

With the May 20, 1887, sale of the Los Angeles and San Gabriel Valley Railroad to the California Central Railway, a subsidiary railroad of the Atchison, Topeka and Santa Fe Railway, the two lines were connected together at Mud Springs, completing the rail line from Chicago to Los Angeles through the San Gabriel Valley. The Santa Fe line served the San Gabriel Valley until 1994, when the 1994 Northridge earthquake weakened the bridge in Arcadia.

== Los Angeles Metro Rail ==
The old Los Angeles and San Gabriel Valley Railroad right of way (ROW) is again in use for public rapid transit by the Los Angeles Metro Rail light rail system. In the late 1990s, construction of the Gold Line started on the ROW, which opened in 2003.

In 2013, construction further east on the ROW began for Phase 2A of the Gold Line Foothill Extension through the San Gabriel Valley and Pomona Valley to Azusa. It uses 1926 Monrovia Santa Fe Depot for its Monrovia station, and the site of the Azusa Depot for its Azusa Downtown station, which opened in 2016. Phase 2B is through the Pomona Valley to the San Bernardino Valley.

The California Southern Railroad was merged into the California Central Railway Company in June 1887. The collapse of the great land boom resulted in the consolidation of the California Southern Railroad, the California Central Railway, and the Redondo Beach Railway in 1889. The new corporation was named: Southern California Railway Company. The repair shops were all moved to San Bernardino, and the rail headquarters were moved to Los Angeles.

== See also ==
- List of California railroads
- History of Trains in Pasadena
- History of rail transportation in California
- Cajon Pass
- Colton Crossing
- Southern Transcon
- Union Station (Los Angeles)
- Rancho Santa Anita Depot
- Pacific Electric's Red Cars that connected with the rail lines.
- Santa Fe 3751
- David B. Jones Special
- Redondo Junction train wreck
