= Three Arts Club of Chicago =

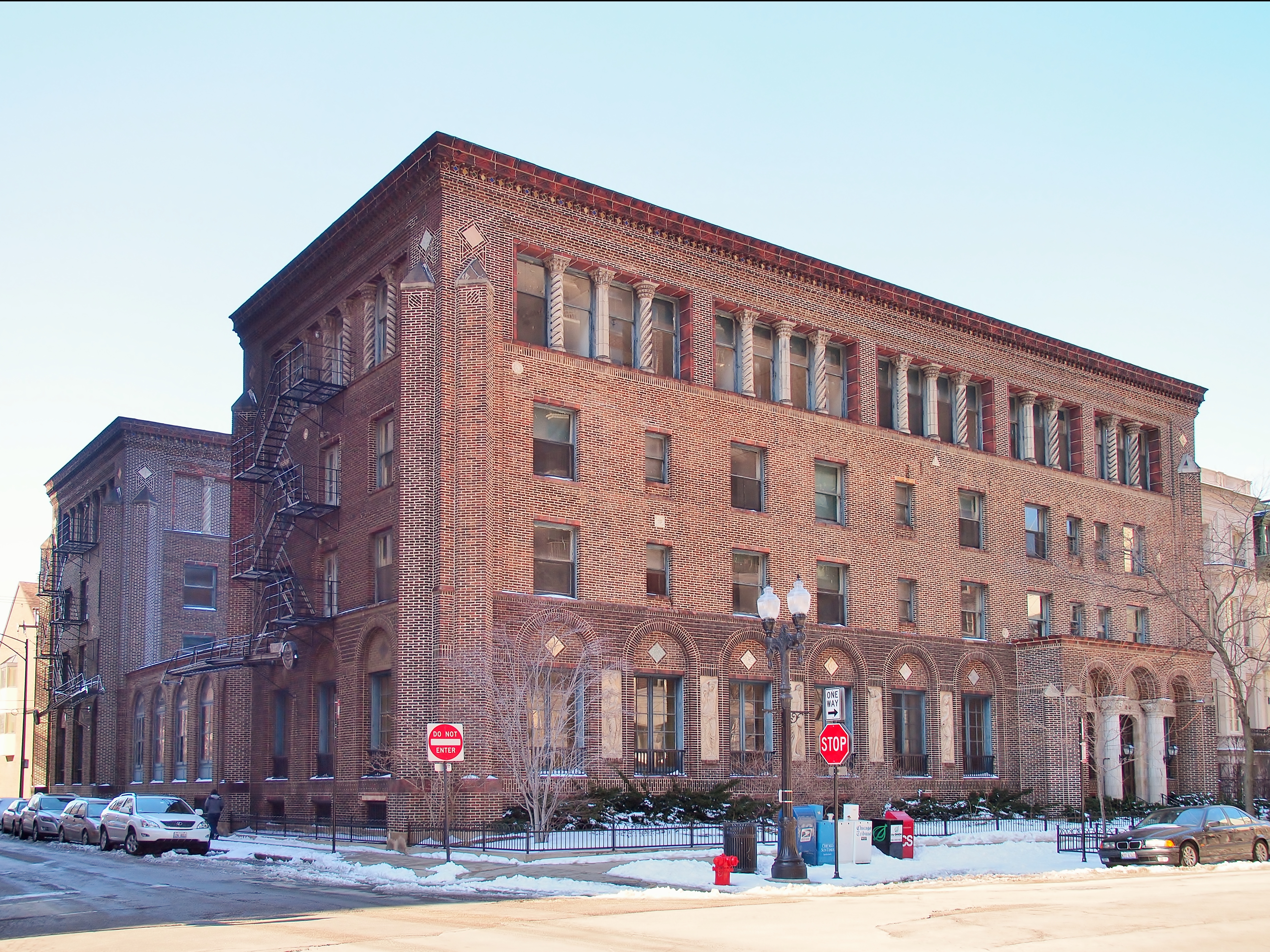
- Three Arts Club of Chicago
- Interactive map of Three Arts Club of Chicago
- 41°54′21.5″N 87°37′49″W
- Location: 1300 N. Dearborn Street, Chicago

History
- Built: 1914

Site notes
- Architect: Holabird & Roche

Chicago Landmark
- Type: Individual
- Designated: June 10, 1981

The Three Arts Club of Chicago was a Chicago home and club for women in the "three arts" of music, painting and drama. The club, modeled on the Three Arts Club of New York, was founded in 1912.

Today, the Three Arts Club building is owned by Restoration Hardware Chicago.

The building was designated as a Chicago Landmark on June 10, 1981.

== History ==
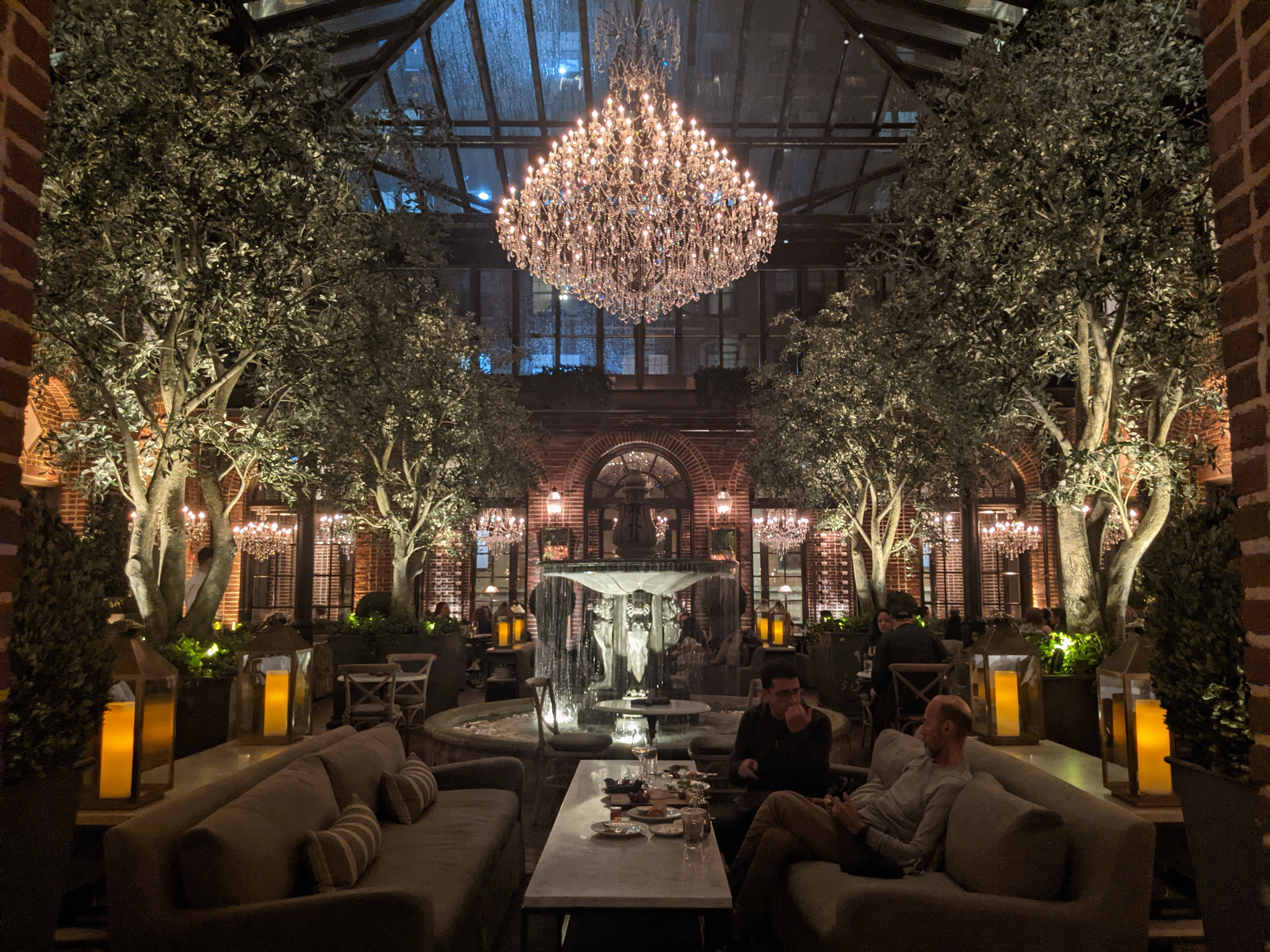
The Three Arts Cafe at Restoration Hardware

The first Three Arts Club residence, located at 1614 North LaSalle Street, had a restaurant and rooms to house sixteen women.

In 1914 the club commissioned their own building, designed by architects Holabird & Roche. The new three story building opened in 1915 at 1300 N. Dearborn Street with 92 residence rooms.

Over 13,000 women stayed in the club throughout its history.

Three Arts Club provided residential space for women artists continuously until 2004, when the last of the residents moved out. In 2007 the building was sold to developers and net proceeds were invested in an operating fund to seed and grow a new nonprofit, 3Arts. Today, the Three Arts Club building is owned by Restoration Hardware Chicago.

== Mission ==
Three Arts Club was formed to be a social center and "safe and congenial" home for women studying arts in Chicago.
