= Hotel Redondo =

Hotel in California, United States

Coordinates: 33.8370°N 118.3894°W

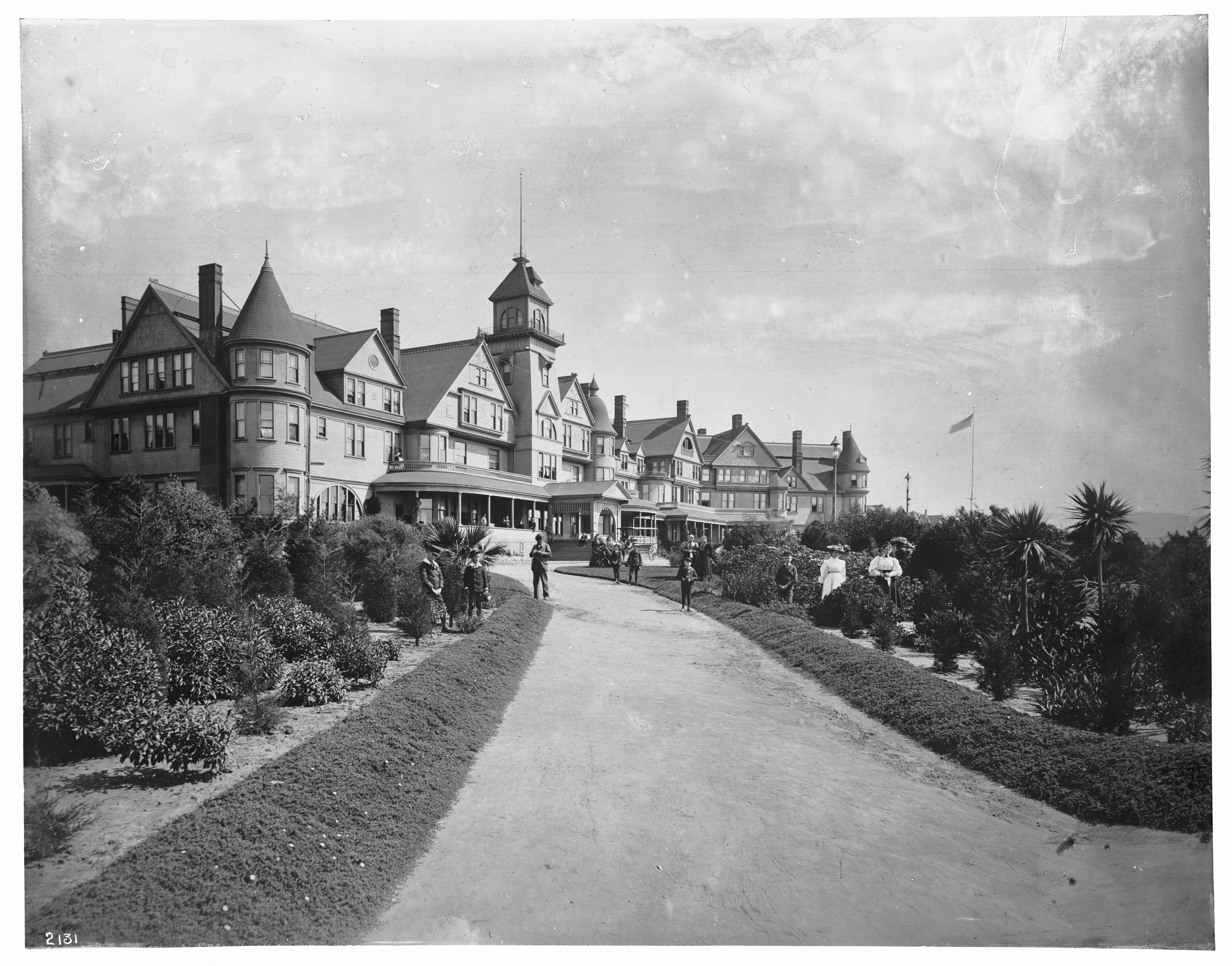
- Hotel Redondo, circa 1900
- Interactive map of the Hotel Redondo area

General information
- Status: Demolished
- Architectural style: High Victorian
- Location: Redondo Beach, California
- Inaugurated: 1890
- Demolished: 1925
- Cost: $500,000

Technical details
- Floor count: 3

Other information
- Number of rooms: 225

Hotel Redondo was a hotel in Redondo Beach, California, that opened in 1890 and was demolished in 1925. The hotel, which had 225 rooms in three stories, was built in a High Victorian style. Construction cost approximately $500,000. At the time, it was one of the most important hotels in Southern California.

== Land acquisition ==
When Don Miguel Dominguez died in 1882, he owned a large parcel of land, Rancho San Pedro, which was passed on to his six daughters. A portion of that land, known as the "Ocean Tract", went to three of his daughters: Susana, Guadalupe, and Maria de Los Reyes Dominguez. In 1889, this 433-acre Ocean Tract was sold for $12,000 to two Oregon steamship operators and entrepreneurs, Robert Thompson and Captain John Ainsworth. Looking to expand their growing company, the "The Oregon Navigation Company", Thompson and Ainsworth formed the Redondo Beach Company and promoted and developed the area as a tourist destination and as a port for their fleet.

== Origins ==
As America approached the 20th Century, the town of Redondo Beach had just been incorporated and was determined to become a worldly destination. Located on the southern shores of the Santa Monica Bay, it had a large submarine canyon that allowed wooden cargo ships, with their deep hulls, to get close enough to the coast to offload their goods onto train cars waiting on one of the several wharfs along the beach.

Los Angeles was booming and in need of a port to funnel goods into the local marketplaces. Rail lines connected Redondo Beach to downtown businesses and the return trains brought thousands of people to this coastal paradise. Thompson and Ainsworth decided a grandiose hotel was needed to accommodate the growing numbers of passenger ships and to further support their efforts of enticing tourists and commerce to visit Redondo Beach. The hotel opened on May 1, 1890, as a 225-room, three-story building on the site later occupied by Veterans Park, in a period when Redondo Beach served as a port for Los Angeles and drew visitors by both railroad and steamship.

== Planning and construction ==
In the later months of 1887, the Redondo Beach Company, responsible for managing construction of the Hotel Redondo, posted advertisements in the Los Angeles Herald newspaper calling on architects to submit plans for building a "Large First-Class hotel to be equal in all respects to the Del Monte in Monterey". A premium price of $1000 was to be paid to the selected architect.

In January 1888, notices were advertised in the Los Angeles Herald for contractors to submit proposals for excavating 30,000 cubic yards of earth to make way for the basement of the soon to be constructed Hotel Redondo.

On March 28, 1889, Mr. H. L. Wyatt, a contractor in Redondo Beach was awarded the contract to build the since modified plans for the Hotel Redondo. Sources conflict, but the price tag for this massive undertaking has been quoted at approximately $250,000 or built at a cost of $1,200,000 with an additional $55,000 in fine Victorian furnishings.

By September 1889, work had begun on the new hotel. More than $82,000 worth of lumber was shipped from the Willamette Steam Mills Company of Portland Oregon. The first shipload of lumber, delivered by Captain Fardelius, arrived at the wharf on June 1 of that same year, just down the bluff from the bustling construction site. The brickwork throughout the hotel was built at a cost of $6,173.

In April 1890, finishing touches were being applied to the hotel. Even though the official opening wasn't for another month, guests had already started occupying rooms. On May 1, 1890, The Hotel Redondo opened its doors to the public. The event was much anticipated throughout the area and celebrations were scheduled to last through May 2.

== Design ==
=== Exterior ===
==== Structure ====
The exterior of the hotel was punctuated with numerous Cambridge finial topped turrets, dormers, gables of varying sizes and red brick chimneys capped with classic Victorian cowls. The exterior walls were clad primarily in scalloped gingerbread wood siding with an almost castle-like brick foundation wall that stood over six feet high. Hundreds of double hung windows ensured that every room was “touched by the Sun” at some point in the day. Windows throughout the third floor level were 15-over-1 style. The upper pane was divided into a central pane surrounded by 14 smaller framed panes. Second floor windows were simple double-hung panes with no grids.

==== Veranda ====
A veranda, supported by numerous Tuscan Style columns and paved with wooden planks meandered along the front elevation of the hotel. Offering shade for the front of the hotel, the Veranda was large enough to accommodate the Seventh Regiment Band who frequently played concerts in the afternoons of the warm summer days. The veranda also afforded guests a comfortable and commanding view of the Pacific Ocean dotted with triple masted ships waiting to dock along the busy wharfs to offload kegs of goods directly onto rail cars destined for the markets in nearby downtown Los Angeles.

==== Entrance ====
The main entrance to the Hotel Lobby was through a rather simple and comparatively small gabled Portico that was adorned with a large sunburst pattern on the front. This was surrounded on three sides by wooden steps.

==== Ainsworth Staircase ====
Access to the beach was down a grand staircase affectionately referred to today as “Ainsworth Staircase”. This staircase stands today as one of the last remnants of the Hotel Redondo, although the majority of it remains covered over by ice plant and newer layers of concrete.

==== Gardens ====
The hotel was surrounded by acres of lushly landscaped plants and colorful flowers blanketing the gently sloping grounds. Victorian parasols could be seen meandering through the many walking paths that submerged guests in flowery bowers. The grounds on the east of the hotel offered many nooks to settle into and seating was generously placed throughout the entire grounds to encourage visitors to stop and take in the sweeping views of the surrounding landscapes.

A 12-acre carnation field filled views and noses with the sweet smells of the flowers to the east of the hotel. Hotel Redondo gardner, Henry Feder, spent much time in 1893, propagating carnations throughout the grounds of the hotel.

On July 11, 1908, the Hotel Redondo added to their sprawling gardens with the opening of the Spanish Gardens. A large adobe structure was the backdrop in this area and provided seating for up to seventy guests and a bustling kitchen to feed them all. Outside, more seating was available on tables that were sheltered from the sun by an enormous palm tree whose branches spanned more than thirty feet. Mixed with the salt air was the vibrant sound of stringed instruments from a Spanish orchestra that performed throughout the evenings on the weekend.

=== Interior ===
==== Rooms ====
Each of the 225 guest rooms was fitted with all the possible conveniences of the time. This included baths with hot and cold water and fireplaces with wood mantels adorned with artistic styling. Each room was situated in such a way as to receive some sun during the day.

==== Banquet hall ====
There was an elegant ballroom that was used for grand celebrations which happened frequently at the hotel. This is also where the final celebration of the season was held as the Hotel often closed for the winter months. One banquet in particular was noted for the extravagant decorations. It was for a local railroad magnate, T.S.C Lowe, who was being celebrated for his recently completed electric railroad erected up the Sierra Madre Mountains. The account was well documented in the Los Angeles Herald from August 31, 1893: “The hall presented its usual brilliancy, the appointments being perfect. Along the center of the table were handsome bouquets of roses and other choice flowers, interspersed with potted plants. Stands of fruit were also placed along the white cloth. A graceful part of the table decorations was a number of photographs of scenes along the Mt. Lowe mountain railroad and placed at intervals."

"At the end of the hall to the rear of the head table the national colors were festooned in a continuous line from one side of the window to the other. Pairs of small silk flags were also placed to advantage about the walls of the room. Around the side columns were entwined wreaths of smilax and roses."

"The Handsomest part of the decoration was at the lower end of the room and in front of the large tier glass. Here was placed a pond of water, being rectangular in form and about 4 feet square. The water was entirely hidden by a mass of beautiful pink and white water lilies, apparently growing between the rich, dark leaves of that plant. A cluster of Egyptian lotus of various colors surmounted the flowery pool.”

==== Billiards room ====
The arrival of summer brought with it an increase in handicap Billiard tournaments often boasting up to twenty competitors. In addition, there was a fully stocked bar for the fine Victorian gentlemen.

==== Bowling alleys ====
Two new bowling alleys were added during renovations made in the fall of 1900. Ladies and gentlemen competitions were arranged for handicap tournaments, as well as, mixed foursomes.

== Entertainment ==
=== "Occasions" ===
The Hotel Redondo hosted numerous community activities throughout the years. People came from all over the Los Angeles Basin, many on the Pacific Electric train cars. International guests often arrived by boats docking at the nearby wharves. Military ships would also visit Redondo Beach. Notable citizens were often celebrated with lavish banquets at the hotel.

Wednesday evenings eventually were designated as the night for special entertainment occasions. The Los Angeles Herald newspaper frequently announced these occasions to entice visitors to the hotel. Many of the events were symbolic of the idyllic culture at the turn of the century and included a noted harpist, Miss Avice Boxall, who in 1901, entertained a “good-sized audience”. In an edition of the Los Angeles Herald from August 1904, it noted that "Fresno residents, Miss Alberta C. Harkley and Miss Helen Archer, performed a high class comedy sketch called “The New French Maid” much to the pleasure of Hotel Redondo guests." Again, the LA Herald, In September 18, 1904, announced a “six-hand euchre party” hosted by Mrs. R. Post at the hotel. Another article from the LA Herald noted that during a regular Wednesday evening dinner at the hotel, "the dining experience was supplemented by a vaudeville performance, which included buck and wing dancing, songs and clogs and a bevy of talented performers."

=== Fishing ===
Fishing was a major draw for many people in Redondo and the wharves just in front of the hotel were some of the most popular fishing spots. One of the largest Yellow tails caught in 1897 was by F. C. McKenna and weighed in at forty-nine pounds. There is also a tale from 1898 of a Hotel Redondo guest, Mr. John F. Francis, who spent a week fishing on the wharves from sun up to sundown. He hauled in more than one ton of fish and even some sharks.

=== Golf course ===
On the grounds south of the hotel was an 18-hole golf course where the Redondo Beach Country Club frequently hosted open handicap golf tournaments. Professional Golfer, W.C.W. Watkins was brought in by the RBCC to manage the course. The 18th hole was a celebrated experience and was nicknamed “Hades”. Golf season opened at the beginning of summer and hosted both men's and women's competitions. Women's tournaments were 18 holes and tee times were early in the morning. The men's competition usually began at 2pm and they played a round of 36. Winners received either a medal or large cup for their first place award. After a competition, Golfers and patrons all gathered at the hotel for a night of dancing.

=== Tennis courts ===
There were three asphalt tennis courts on the hotel's grounds and often hosted tournaments including a “Duffers” tournament for aspiring tennis players.

== Beach cottages ==
For a more private experience, the hotel offered several nearby beach cottages as an extension of the hotel. Hotel guests would frequently stroll down the Esplanade dressed in their finest Victorian outfits and took in intermittent ocean views peeking through these cottages scattered along the broad avenue. The cottages were eventually sold off by Henry Huntington when he took ownership of the hotel in 1905. One employee of Mr. Huntington's, Olin McWain, purchased several oceanfront properties, including one of the hotel cottages, which still stands today on the Esplanade. The “McWain home” has been passed down through generations and is currently owned by a fourth generation family member.

== Tent City ==
Four prominent Redondo Beach citizens leased half the Hotel Redondo North end grounds in order to open a Tent City to house guests. The grounds were selected due to the abundance of shade trees and the proximity to the beach and pier areas. The formal opening in 1903 was a celebrated event with orchestra music and lively dancing. For between $3 - $13 a week, guests could stay in these wooden floored tents that boasted electric lights. Later in 1908, improvements were made so the tract will be in a terrace plan and the tents larger and better finished.

== Proprietors/owners/managers ==
1890 - E.W. Root

1901 – Well known Hoteliers, Dan Murphy and Charlie Duffy take ownership of the Hotel Redondo.

1903 - 1909 - H.J. Woolacott

1909 - Newton J. Skinner and W.J. Conners – President and Vice President, respectively, of the All Night and Day Bank of Los Angeles Purchased Hotel Redondo in 1909 for a cost believed to be more than $1,000,000. Skinner served as Proprietor of the hotel through at least September 1912.

== Marketing and promotion ==
To support an easy means of travel to the Hotel Redondo, two lines of railway were constructed and serviced by first-class train service that ran throughout the day. These new rail lines connected Redondo Beach to the wealthy residents of Los Angeles and surrounding areas.

Most visitors arrived in Redondo Beach either by horse and buggy from greater Los Angeles or by steamships, which stopped at one of the three piers four times a week. Many tourists who visited after the turn of the century arrived on Henry Huntington’s newly completed Redondo Railway cars that provided service from Downtown Los Angeles, along the Beach Cities and terminating at the front of the Hotel Redondo. Notable guests to the hotel were frequently announced in the Los Angeles Herald newspaper and celebrated with much fanfare upon their arrival.

Because of prohibition and declining tourism, the Hotel Redondo closed its doors and in 1925 was sold for scrap lumber–the price was $300.

== See also ==
- Hotel Del Coronado
