= Port Ballona, California =

19th century planned harbor of Santa Monica Bay

Port Ballona
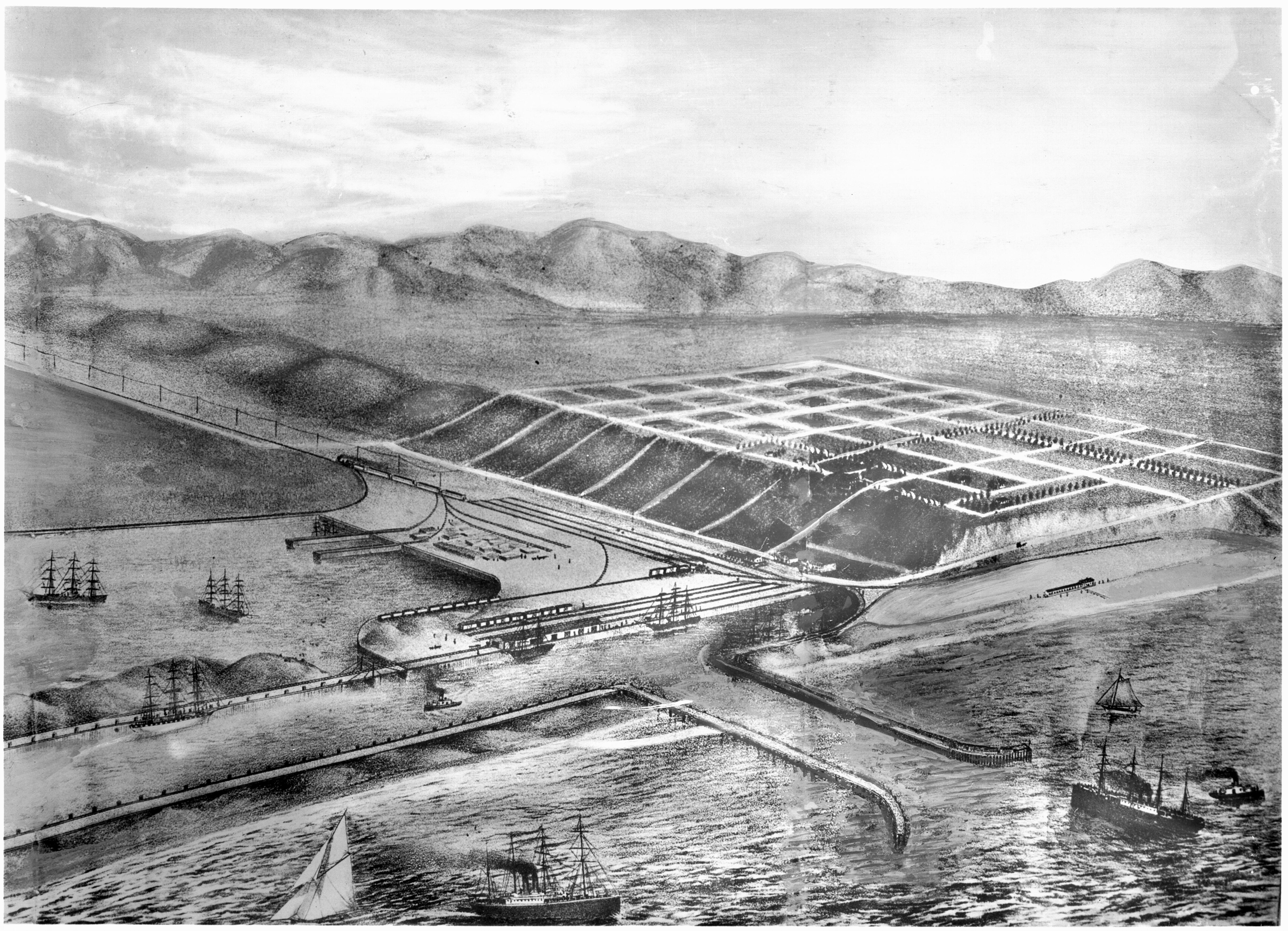
- Lithograph issued by Moye Wicks depicting a conception of the completed Port Ballona harbor, ca.1887
- Interactive map of Port Ballona
- Coordinates: 33°58′46″N 118°27′10″W
- Established: 1839
- Elevation: 16 ft (5 m)
- Time zone: UTC-8 (Pacific (PST))
  - Summer (DST): UTC-7 (PDT)

Port Ballona is an archaic place name for an area near the center of Santa Monica Bay in coastal Los Angeles County, where Playa Del Rey and Del Rey Lagoon are located today. Port Ballona was a planned harbor and town site from circa 1859 to 1903. The name comes from the Rancho La Ballona Mexican land grant.

Port Ballona consisted of the current Del Rey Lagoon Park but conceptually also included the current Ballona Wetlands State Ecological Reserve alongside the estuarine river Ballona Creek, which flowed into and alongside the marsh within earthen levees built of soft-bottomed wetland soil. While these plans never came to fruition, and the area remains a primarily residential neighborhood, the wetlands immediately to the north were eventually developed into Marina del Rey, North America's largest man-made small-craft harbor.

== History ==
In 1839, the Mexican government granted the Machados and Talamantes families title to Rancho La Ballona.

In 1857, Benjamin D. Wilson, the mayor of Los Angeles, through foreclosure received title to a quarter of Rancho La Ballona. Later, in 1859, Wilson, for $5000, sold 3,480 acres (1,410 ha) of Rancho La Ballona to George A. Sanford and John D. Young. During the Civil War, General George Wright ordered troops to secure Port Ballona against any Confederacy invasion; by 1862, a large force of 6,000 Union troops were at and near Port Ballona. The troop camp was called Camp Latham after Milton Latham.

The Great Flood of 1862 turned the Port and the land around it into a swamp for six months.

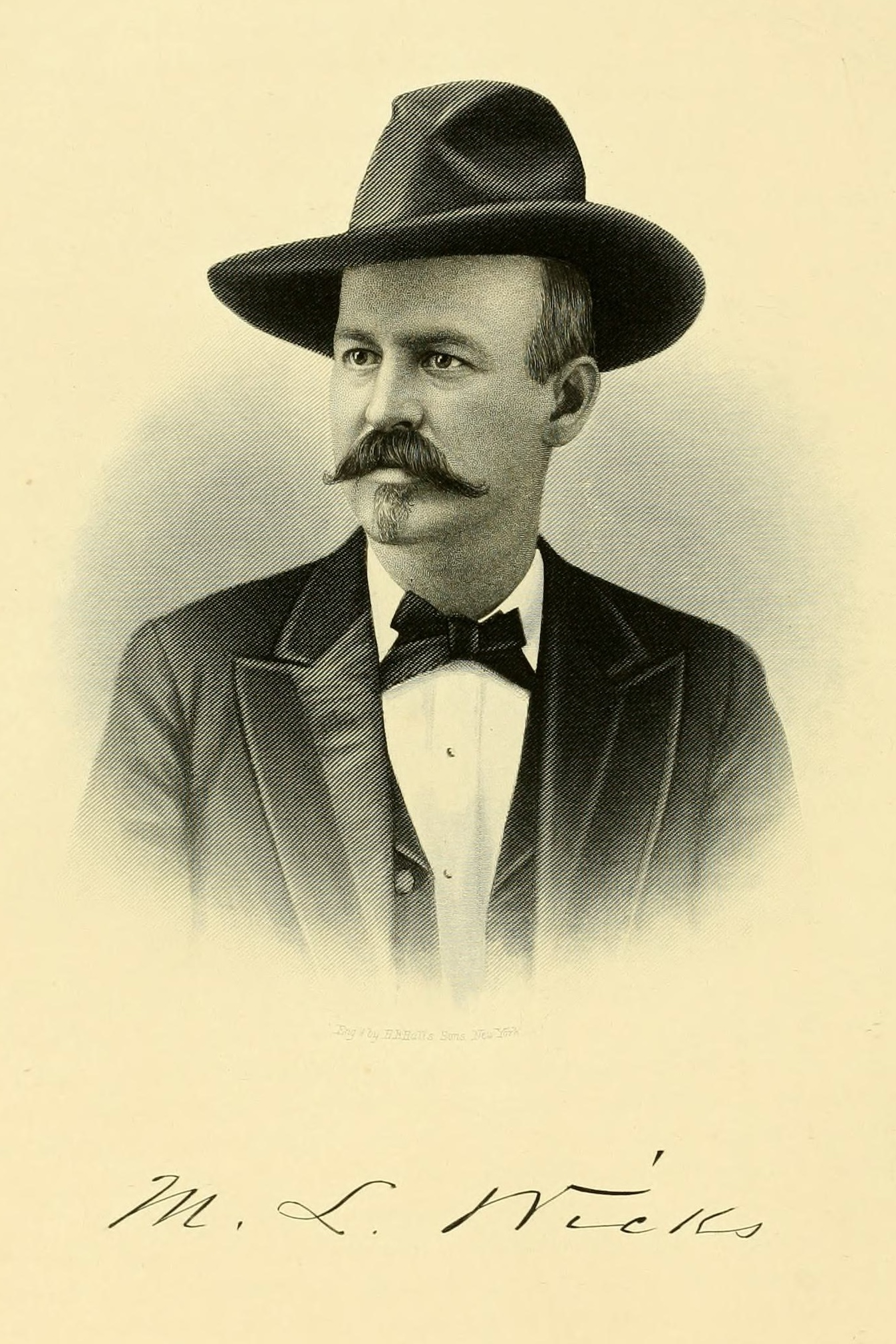
Moses Langley Wicks (1889)

In 1863, Louis Mesmer sold his Los Angeles bakery and purchased extensive land holdings from the Machados, including Port Ballona. In 1887, Louis Mesmer and Moye Wicks made a small harbor at Port Ballona. Moye Wicks starts the Ballona Harbor and Improvement Company in 1887, with plans to make the port a major sea port. On August 21, 1887, the Town of Port Ballona was developed by Louis Mesmer and Moye Wicks. By 1889, Ballona Harbor and Improvement Company was out of funds to complete the maintain and expand the port, they could not keep the Port open. Louis Mesmer and Moye Wicks sold the port and land around the port to Moses Sherman. Sherman purchased 1,000 acres (400 ha) of land around the Ballona lagoon and the Port Ballona in 1902 under the name, Beach Land Company.

Port Ballona rail depot was built at the port and serviced by the California Central Railway opening in September 1887; this line later became the Santa Fe Railway, that later became the Atchison, Topeka, and Santa Fe Railroad. The rail line ran from the port to Redondo junction.

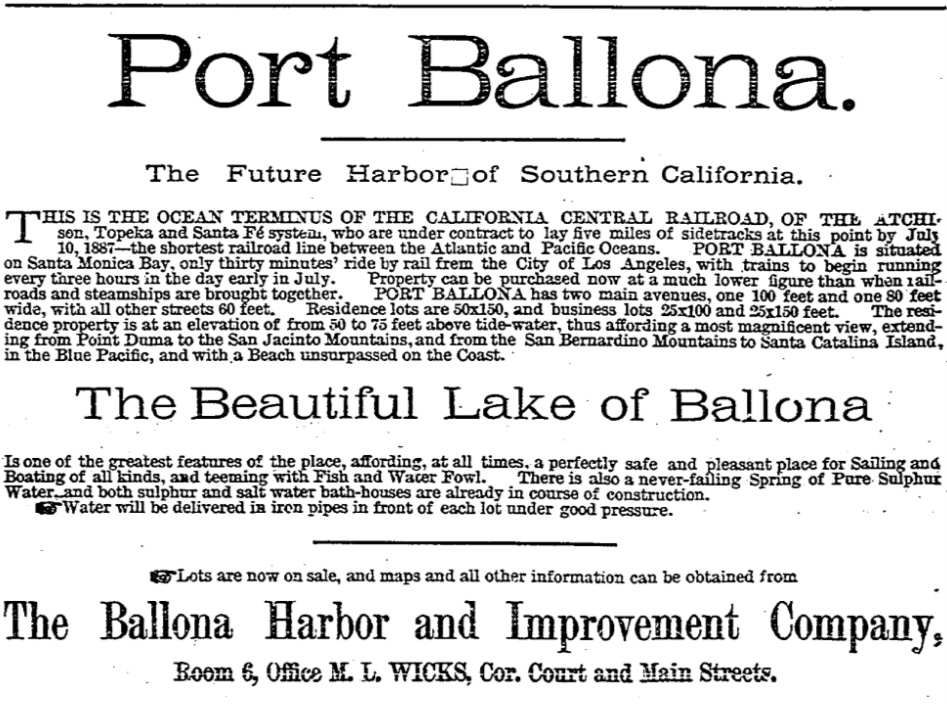
Port Ballona advertisement 1887

Sherman and Clark renamed the port and land around the port to Del Rey in 1903. Port Ballona, in 1903, was renamed Playa Del Rey by Sherman and Clark.

Port Ballona Street car depot, built by Sherman's Redondo and Hermosa Beach Railroad, was part of the Los Angeles Pacific Railroad. The Sherman's tram line opened in December 1902, it departed Downtown Los Angeles at 4th & Broadway.

In the 1880s and 1890s, parts of Venice, Playa Vista, Culver City, and Mar Vista were also part of Port Ballona.

== See also ==
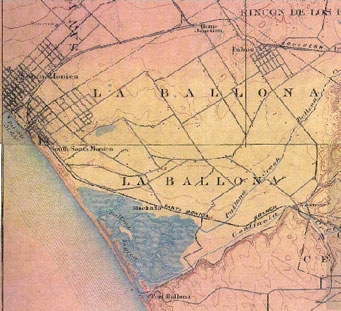
1902 Map of La Ballona and Port Ballona

1896 Port Ballona

- Port of Los Angeles Long Wharf Santa Monica
- Port of Los Angeles San Pedro
- Port of Long Beach
