= David B. Jones Special =

The David B. Jones Special was a one-time, passenger train operated by the Atchison, Topeka and Santa Fe Railway from Los Angeles, California, to Chicago, Illinois, at the request of David Benton Jones. David B. Jones was suddenly taken ill with cancer at his winter home "Pepper Hill" in Montecito, California. This special rushed him to his Chicago physicians and surgeons at an average speed of 50 miles per hour (80 km/h). This run was completed three minutes faster than the more famous 1905 Scott Special. Although not part of the speed run, the train continued on to David B. Jones' summer home in Lake Forest, Illinois.

== Overall trip summary ==
The train left La Grande Station at Los Angeles at 11:33 PM May 5, 1923, Pacific Time and arrived in Chicago at 12:50 AM on May 8 Central Time. The 2,232-mile (3,592 km) journey was completed "in exactly 47 hours and 27 minutes." The actual running time was only 44 hours and 51 minutes which deducts time spent for stops such as those for coal and water and the 55-minute delay caused by the breakdown of a Union Pacific locomotive ahead of the special at Nebo, California. The running time was therefore three minutes less (Note: But notice that the Scott Special traveled 2,265 miles (3,645 km) between Los Angeles and Chicago; The Jones Special traveled 2,232 miles (3,592 km) between the same cities.) than the Scott Special. Thus, the average speed was 47 mph (76 km/h) and the average running speed was 50 mph (80 km/h). It was "a phenomenal run when compared with the regular Santa Fe limited time of sixty-eight hours and thirty minutes." The $11,000 special thus saved about 20 hours over the time of the regularly scheduled train. ($11,000 is equivalent to $203,000 in present-day terms.) "Mr. Jones' daughter, Gwendolyn (Note: Actually, her name was Gwenthalyn Jones.) Jones; his brother [Thomas D.], a doctor and two nurses accompanied him on the trip."

== Speed and time over selected segments ==
The special train traveled over selected segments as follows: (Note: This account has been derived from various newspaper accounts. No comprehensive account has been found.) F. M. Gillette, engineer, and W. L. Evens, fireman on locomotive 1370 ran between Los Angeles and Barstow, California-141.4 miles (228 km)—on the Los Angeles Division in 3 hours and 26 minutes. This included:

- 34 minutes in the first 13 miles (21 km) to Lamanda Park, Pasadena, California, due to a slow order, and
- 16 minutes taking water and testing the air brakes, and
- 27 minutes climbing a "stiff" mountain grade (Cajon Pass).

The 432-mile (695 km) run between Seligman, Arizona, and Albuquerque, New Mexico, on the Albuquerque Division was scheduled for 12 hours, but completed in 9 hours and 32 minutes.

"The stretch between Dodge City and Newton, Kansas, was covered at 65 miles per hour [(105 km/h)]."

The Special covered the 455.3 miles (733 km) between Argentine, Kansas, and Chicago in 7 hours and 45 minutes at about 60 mph (97 km/h). This was "thirty minutes faster than the Scott Special." (Note: Actually, it was twelve minutes faster.)

== After arriving in Chicago ==
"Upon arrival here [Chicago] it was switched back over the Northwestern track to Lake Forest, arriving there at 3:46 p.m. This switchback, however, is not counted in making the record."

== Legacy ==
The run "was in the nature of staging a comeback at the aviation record in the non-stop flight from New York to San Diego last week." However, the run was only marginally faster than the Scott Special.
