= 1963 in rail transport =

This article lists events related to rail transport that occurred in 1963.

== Events ==
=== January events ===
- January 21 - The Chicago North Shore and Milwaukee Railroad ceases all operation.
- January 26 - The last passenger train on Canadian Pacific Railway between Ottawa and Maniwaki, Quebec, departs using CP RDCs 9105 and 9023.

=== February events ===
- February 28 – Toei Subway Line 1 (present-day Asakusa Line) opens between Ningyocho and Higashi-ginza in Tokyo, Japan.

=== March events ===
- March 27 - First Beeching cuts Reshaping of British railways report published.
- March 31 - Los Angeles County Metropolitan Transportation Authority ends streetcar service on the last of the former Los Angeles Railway lines: J, P, R, S, and V.

=== May events ===
- May 4 - Nickel Plate 765 is retired.
- May 20 - The Rutland Railroad, in New York and Vermont, ceases operations; the right-of-way is officially abandoned after ICC approval earlier in the year.

=== June events ===
==== June 28 ====
- The Philadelphia and Reading Railroad's King Coal passenger train makes its final run to Shamokin, Pennsylvania.
- Caerphilly railway works in Wales closes.

=== July events ===
- July 15 – Yabitsu Station in Yokote, Akita Prefecture, Japan, is opened for regular service.
- July 23 - The Chicago and North Western Railway's passenger trains from Chicago, Illinois to Minnesota, the Twin Cities 400 and the Rochester 400, cease operation following approval from the Interstate Commerce Commission.

=== August events ===
- August 8 - Great Train Robbery (1963) £2.6 million train robbery. (£47.5 million in 2025 adjusted for inflation)
- August 20 - The one millionth railroad carload of lettuce is shipped from Salinas, California.
- August 31 - Detroit, Toledo and Ironton Railroad takes control of Ann Arbor Railroad, in Michigan.

=== September events ===
- September - General Electric introduces the GE U25C.

=== October events ===
- October 16 - The Nickel Plate Road together with the Wabash Railroad and several smaller carriers are merged with the profitable Norfolk & Western Railway (N&W).

=== November events ===
- November - General Motors Electro-Motive Division introduces the EMD GP30.
- November 9 - Two passenger trains collide with a derailed freight train on the Tōkaidō Main Line in Yokohama, Japan; the Yokohama rail crash results in 161 deaths.

=== December events ===
- December 12 – Toei Subway Line 1 (present-day Asakusa Line) opens between Higashi-Ginza and Shimbashi in Tokyo, Japan. This is the fourth extension of the line since it opened in 1960.
- Mitsubishi Heavy Industries of Japan ship a final batch of ten 2-10-2 steam locomotives to a design improved by Livio Dante Porta for the isolated Ramal Ferro Industrial Río Turbio (RFIRP) 750 mm gauge railway in the southern Patagonian Desert of Argentina to haul coal from Río Turbio for shipping from Río Gallegos, Santa Cruz. See also Rio Turbio Railway.

=== Unknown date events ===
- Mauritania Railway opened.
- The Central of Georgia Railway is merged into the Southern Railway (U.S.)
- ALCO introduces the ALCO Century 628.
- SNCF Class BB 67000 diesel locomotives introduced in France.
- Eritrean Railway assembles 0-4-4-0T R442.61 in its shops at Asmara, the last Mallet locomotive built in the world.
