= L (Los Angeles Railway) =

Streetcar route (1920–1940)

Overview
- Owner: Los Angeles Railway
- Locale: Los Angeles

Service
- Type: Streetcar
- System: Los Angeles Railway

History
- Opened: May 9, 1920
- Closed: May 26, 1940

Technical
- Track gauge: 3 ft 6 in (1,067 mm)
- Electrification: Overhead line, 600 V DC

L was a streetcar line in Los Angeles, California. It was operated by the Los Angeles Railway from 1920 to 1940.

== History ==
The West 11th and Lincoln Park line began service on May 9, 1920, as a through routing of the San Pedro and W. 11th Street Line and trackage on Main Street. The eastern end of the route formed a large counterclockwise loop through Lincoln Heights, with the complementing clockwise service through the segment routed to the West Adams and Lincoln Park line. It was given the letter designation L in 1921. In August 1924 loop was eliminated, with line now running bi-directional on Mission Place and the A Line taking over tracks on Broadway. That December the west end was rerouted to Spring and Ord Streets. L service took over the branch line which was built to serve the Glendale and Montrose Railway in 1925 — O and E cars initially had served been routed along the line. Tracks between Spring and Main Streets were eliminated in April 1926 to facilitate construction of the new Los Angeles City Hall. The following July, service to the Glendale and Montrose Railway depot was discontinued and the line was rerouted downtown to terminate at Spring and Court Streets. Cars followed a detour on P line tracks at the end of 1927 and routed to Spring and Temple Streets following construction of the 1st Street Viaduct.

On June 12, 1932, the line was rerouted downtown to terminate at Fountain Avenue and Edgemont Street — cars ceased running on Flower Street, 10th Street, Main Street, and Spring Street. Cars were briefly run through the new Hill Street Tunnel in 1939 before again being rerouted downtown. The final iteration of the L line began at Olympic Boulevard and Mullen Street and ended at the Civic Center, running via 10th (which was being rebuilt as Olympic), Country Club, Victoria, Hoover, 11th, Main, and Spring. The western end of the line was cut back to Menlo Avenue in April 1940, shortly before the service was discontinued on May 26.

== See also ==
- Streetcars in Los Angeles
