= B (Los Angeles Railway) =

Overview
- Locale: Los Angeles

Service
- Type: Streetcar
- System: Los Angeles Railway
- Daily ridership: 13,185 (1940)

History
- Opened: May 9, 1920
- Closed: December 5, 1948

Technical
- Track gauge: 3 ft 6 in (1,067 mm)
- Electrification: Overhead line, 600 V DC

The B was a streetcar line in Los Angeles, California. It was operated by the Los Angeles Railway from 1920 to 1948, originally running from Ramona Boulevard and Miller Street in East Los Angeles to Ascot Avenue and 51st Street.

== History ==
=== Brooklyn and Ascot Lines (1895–1911) ===
The first Brooklyn line was built in 1895 by the Los Angeles Consolidated Railway as a horsecar road. It terminated at the intersection of Brooklyn Avenue and Evergreen Avenue. The line was electrified the following year and rerouted downtown. In 1902 the route was bought by the Pacific Electric Railway to be standard gauged, but never was. In 1908, the Brooklyn Avenue Line ran from Arcade Depot to Evergreen Cemetery via 5th Street, Main Street, Macy, Pleasant Avenue, Bridge, and Brooklyn Avenue.

Following the Great Merger of 1911, control of the route returned to the Los Angeles Railway. They extended the route north and east along Evergreen and Wabash Avenues to the city limits in 1915.

=== Expansion and later removal (1911–1949) ===
The line was rerouted on May 9, 1920 and given the letter designation B the following year. Tracks on 9th Street were taken over by the N Line and the remaining service was merged with the Ascot Line, a previously unconnected route which ran by way of Main Street, 12th Street, Hooper Avenue, a private right-of-way alongside the Santa Monica Air Line, and Ascot Avenue. (A section of this, between Adams Boulevard and 41st Street, has since been filled in.)

In 1924, rush hour trips were extended northeast along the newly built Harrison Street (later Ramona Boulevard, and later still City Terrace Drive) to Alma Street in East Los Angeles. Completion of the Macy Street Bridge in April 1926 allowed through-routing to Brooklyn Heights. The line began serving Union Station upon its opening in 1939. The final extension of the line was north to City Terrace and Miller Street on March 13, 1931. Streetcars were replaced with trolleybuses on December 5, 1948.

== See also ==
- Streetcars in Los Angeles
