= E (Los Angeles Railway) =

Overview
- Locale: Los Angeles

Service
- Type: Streetcar
- System: Los Angeles Railway

History
- Opened: May 9, 1920
- Closed: June 30, 1946

Technical
- Track gauge: 3 ft 6 in (1,067 mm)
- Electrification: 600 V DC overhead line

E refers to two streetcar routes in Los Angeles, California which were operated by the Los Angeles Railway. The first incarnation was in service from 1920 to 1932 when it was redesignated as route 5. The second existed between 1920 and 1946, though it was initially assigned the route number 33. This article mostly deals with the latter.

== Eagle Rock and Hawthorne ==
In the 1921 lettering scheme, E was assigned to a route running from Eagle Rock to Hawthorne. This service was re-designated as route 5 after 1932, and is further discussed in greater detail in its own article.

== Evergreen Avenue Line ==
Line 33 started as a new service in 1920, formed from tracks on Euclid, 4th, and Evergreen. The line served as a branch of the F. By 1924, the route was extended north to terminate at Ramona Boulevard and Miller Avenue.

This line designation was changed to the letter E for service starting May 19, 1939. After June 30, 1946, the route was changed to bus operations.

== See also ==
- Streetcars in Los Angeles
