= H (Los Angeles Railway) =

Overview
- Locale: Los Angeles

Service
- Type: Streetcar
- System: Los Angeles Railway
- Daily ridership: 14,484 (1940)

History
- Opened: 1912
- Closed: August 3, 1947

Technical
- Track gauge: 3 ft 6 in (1,067 mm)
- Electrification: Overhead line, 600 V DC

H was a streetcar route in Los Angeles, California. It was owned and operated by the Los Angeles Railway from 1912 to 1947.

== History ==
The route's origins begin when the streetcar lines running on Washington Street and Maple Avenue were combined into a single service in 1912, running through Downtown. During the 1920 rerouting, the Washington Street line was spun into the West Washington and Garvanza Line. Thus, the Maple and Heliotrope line consisted of tracks on Melrose; Heliotrope; Temple; New Hampshire; First; Bimini Place; a private right of way; 2nd; Rampart; 6th; Alvarado; 7th; Maple; Woodlawn; Santa Barbara; Wall; and 53rd. The Maple segment became the south end of the new line, which ran to Melrose to Normandie in Melrose Hill. The line was given the letter designation H in 1921. Service between First and the University of California was temporarily discontinued in the summer of 1924 amid citywide power cuts. The western end was rerouted via Vermont and Beverly in 1924 and extended to Melrose and Western the following year. This routing pattern held until August 3, 1947 when service was discontinued.

== See also ==
- Streetcars in Los Angeles
