= W Line =

W Line may refer to:

- W (New York City Subway service)
- W Line (Norfolk Southern), a freight rail line
- W Line (RTD), a light rail line in Denver and Jefferson County, Colorado
- W (Los Angeles Railway), a former streetcar line in Los Angeles, California
