= K (Los Angeles Railway) =

Former tram service in Los Angeles, United States

Overview
- Owner: Los Angeles Railway
- Locale: Los Angeles
- Termini: Ascot Avenue and East 38th Street; South Vermont Avenue and Florence Avenue

Service
- Type: Streetcar
- System: Los Angeles Railway

History
- Opened: February 1, 1913
- Closed: October 5, 1941

Technical
- Track gauge: 3 ft 6 in (1,067 mm)
- Electrification: Overhead line, 600 V DC

K was a streetcar line in Los Angeles, California. It was operated by the Los Angeles Railway from 1913 to 1941.

== History ==
The East Jefferson and 38th Street line opened on February 1, 1913. It ran from Main Street and Jefferson Avenue to East 38th Street and Ascot Avenue via Jefferson, Central Avenue, and East 38th Street. Service was extended to USC in 1918. The route was given the letter designation K in 1921.

Between 1932 and 1933, the line saw numerous reroutes. On September 11, 1933 the line began its ultimate routing, running from Ascot Avenue and East 38th Street to South Vermont Avenue and Florence Avenue. (38th Street was renamed to 41st Street in 1937.) The line was discontinued on October 5, 1941 and service from Jefferson and Vermont Avenues to USC was thereafter provided by the U line. The abandoned section became the basis for the company's bus route 18.

== See also ==
- Streetcars in Los Angeles
