= E-line =

E Line or Line E may refer to:

== Transport ==
- E (New York City Subway service)
- E (S-train), in Copenhagen, Denmark
- E Line (RTD), in the Denver-Aurora Metropolitan Area, Colorado
- E Line (Los Angeles Metro), a light rail line in Los Angeles County, California
- E (Los Angeles Railway), former streetcar service
- E (AC Transit), a bus line in the San Francisco Bay Area
- E Embarcadero, streetcar line in San Francisco
- Line E (Buenos Aires Underground)
- Metro E Line (Minnesota), a planned bus rapid transit line in Minneapolis
- RapidRide E Line, in Seattle, Washington

== Other uses ==
- E-line (power line communication)
- Ethernet Private Line

== See also ==
- E Train (disambiguation)
