= N Line =

N Line may refer to:

- N Line (RTD), a commuter rail line in Denver
- N Line, a commuter rail line serving Seattle, Washington, United States
- N (New York City Subway service), a subway line in New York City
- Transilien Line N, a suburban rail sector in Île de France
- N Judah, a light rail line in San Francisco
- N (Los Angeles Railway), a former streetcar service in Los Angeles
