= O (Los Angeles Railway) =

Streetcar route (1918–1947)

Overview
- Locale: Los Angeles

Service
- Type: Streetcar
- System: Los Angeles Railway

History
- Opened: 1918
- Closed: August 3, 1947

Technical
- Track gauge: 3 ft 6 in (1,067 mm)
- Electrification: Overhead line, 600 V DC

O was a streetcar line in Los Angeles, California. It was operated by the Los Angeles Railway and ran until 1947.

== History ==
The O was formed from branches of existing lines. It ran on Main Street and 8th Street then to 1st and Virgil Avenue. Service began in 1918. Two years later, and was largely cut back to only run on Main Street with the northern end also running on Sunset Boulevard, North Spring Street, and Ord Street. The route was assigned the letter designation O in 1921.

The line was extended north on February 3, 1924, leaving the old route at Spring and Ord and reaching Cypress to Verdugo Road, where an interchange with the Glendale and Montrose Railway was located. This service lasted four months before the terminus was reverted to Spring and Ord.

The line was extended north again on July 4, 1926 via Main Street and Mission Road to Selig Place, adjacent to Lincoln Park. An additional extension south to Florence was built during the Great Depression in 1931. This routing remained until the line was discontinued on August 3, 1947.

== See also ==
- Streetcars in Los Angeles
