= J (Los Angeles Railway) =

Overview
- Owner: Los Angeles Metropolitan Transit Authority
- Locale: Los Angeles, Vernon, Huntington Park, and Walnut Park
- Termini: Jefferson Boulevard and 10th Avenue; Seville Avenue and Palm Place
- Stations: 82

Service
- Type: Streetcar
- System: Los Angeles Railway; Los Angeles Metropolitan Transit Authority

History
- Opened: 1920
- Closed: March 31, 1963

Technical
- Track gauge: 3 ft 6 in (1,067 mm)
- Electrification: Overhead line, 600 V DC

J was a streetcar line in Los Angeles, California. It was operated by the Los Angeles Railway from 1911 to 1945, by Los Angeles Transit Lines from 1945 to 1958, and by the Los Angeles Metropolitan Transit Authority from 1958 to 1963.

== History ==
=== Huntington Line (1895–1911) ===
The Huntington Line was one of the original routes of the Los Angeles Railway. From Downtown, it branched off the Pico Line at 1st and Santa Fe. From there, it followed a route south on Santa Fe Avenue, a private right-of-way, Mateo Street, 9th Street, Santa Fe Avenue, Pacific Boulevard, Florence Avenue, and Seville Avenue to Walnut Park, with an additional branch down Santa Fe to Slauson Avenue. After 1911, a shuttle route continued to run on Mateo Street, but the remainder of the route now entered Downtown Los Angeles via 7th Street.

=== Jefferson Line (1898–1911) ===
The Jefferson Line was built by the Los Angeles Traction Company, and ran as a meager shuttle route on West Jefferson Boulevard between 4th Avenue and Wesley Avenue (present-day University Avenue) at the University of Southern California, where there were two transfer points for the Los Angeles Railway's University Line. The route was maintained by the Los Angeles Interurban Railway, then the Pacific Electric Railway, who operated the local route until the Great Merger of 1911. From that point on, the Jefferson Line was integrated into the Huntington Line and extended west to 9th Avenue.

=== J Line (1911–1963) ===
In 1921, the route became known as "J." The line ran from Jefferson and 9th in the Jefferson Park neighborhood of Los Angeles, to Seville and Santa Ana Streets in Walnut Park. Cars operated by way of West Jefferson Boulevard, South Grand Avenue, 7th Street, Mateo Street, East Olympic Boulevard, South Santa Fe Avenue, Pacific Boulevard, East Florence Avenue, and Seville Avenue. Early on, a short-lived branch line was run east on Jefferson to San Pedro. The line was extended at both ends to new balloon loops in 1939: one at 10th Street and the Palm Place loop.

The service was transferred to the Los Angeles Metropolitan Transit Authority in 1958. In 1962, due to a paving project, rail service east of Seventh and San Pedro was rerouted with a deviation and aligned with the S line south on San Pedro and Avalon, thence left on Vernon through the Jazz District aligned with the V line to Santa Fe Avenue and Pacific Boulevard until service ceased on March 31, 1963. This line contributed to the success of Huntington Park's Pacific Boulevard business district for many years.

== See also ==
- Streetcars in Los Angeles
