= Plaza Substation =

- U.S. National Register of Historic Places
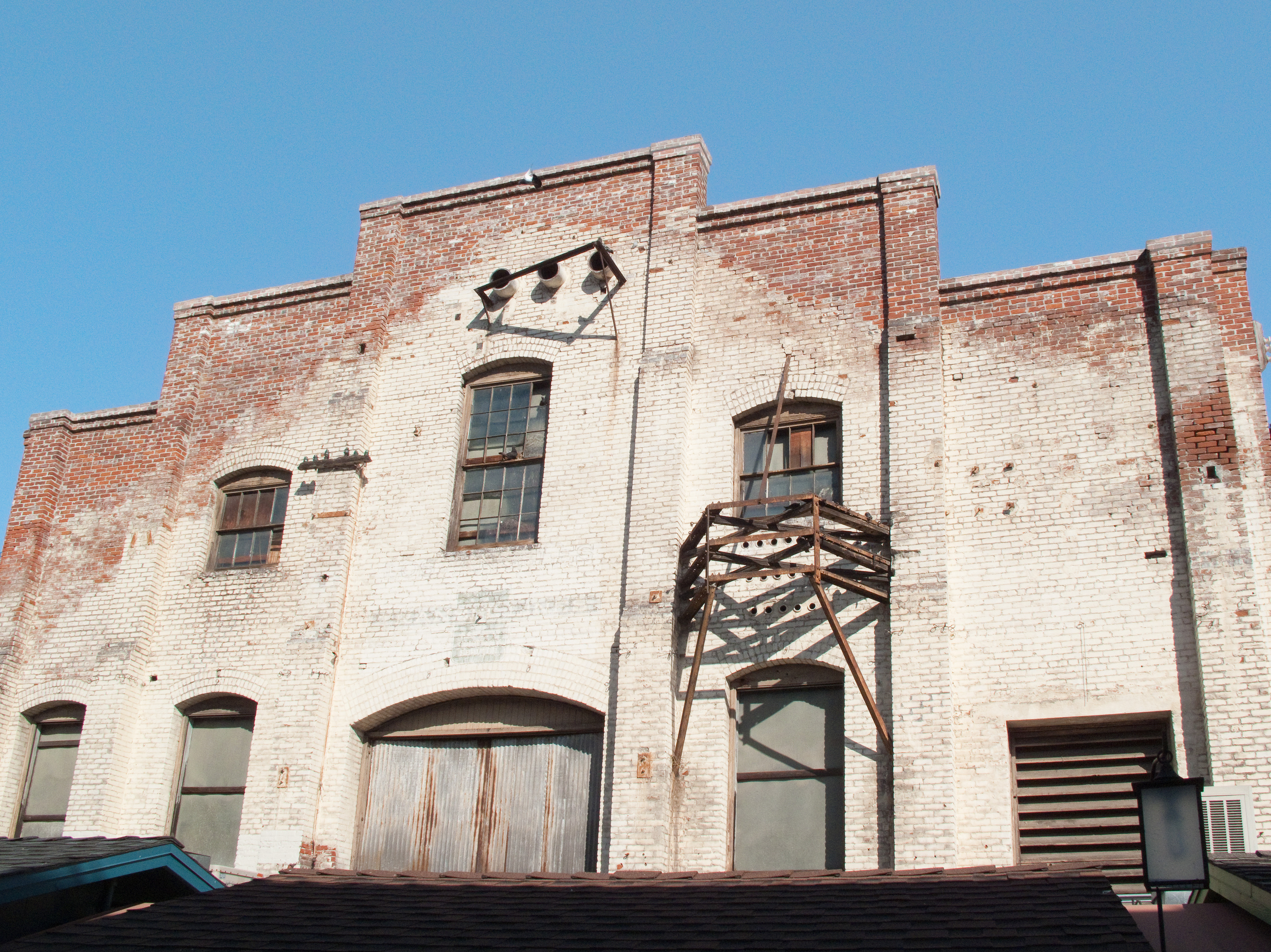

- Location within the Los Angeles metropolitan area Location within California Location within the United States
- Location: 10 Olvera St., Los Angeles, California
- Coordinates: 34°3′25.5″N 118°14′17″W
- Built: 1905
- Architectural style: Mission/Spanish Revival
- NRHP reference No.: 78000689
- Added to NRHP: September 13, 1978

The Plaza Substation was an electrical substation that formed a part of the "Yellow Car" streetcar system operated by the Los Angeles Railway from the early 1900s until 1963. After being threatened with demolition in the 1970s, the Plaza Substation was added to the National Register of Historic Places in 1978.

== Construction of the substation ==
In May 1903, Henry Huntington, owner of the Los Angeles Railway, announced plans to build a new substation near the old plaza. The Los Angeles Times reported: "Another mammoth electricity substation is to be constructed by the Los Angeles Railway Company. Its location will be on the Plaza, and its completion will mean a long step forward toward the perfection of a system that already is surpassed by few in this country." By 1905, the substation was operating, and the Times ran an article detailing the relationship between the railway's four substations and its central power station at Sixth Street and Central Avenue. The Times described the role of the Plaza Substation this way:

"From this place of manufacture, so to speak, the current is distributed to four other substations scattered over the city, known respectively as the Plaza, University, Westlake and South Park substations. In these there are no oil furnaces, boilers, or steam engines; only the electric current itself has to be dealt with, so that there is economy on the score both of plant and of labor. The central station, besides generating the electricity, also performs the work of a substation. It sends out about 40 per cent of the power used for the operation of the street cars on the Los Angeles Railway Company's system. The Plaza station, distributes the next 40 per cent used, while the three others combined account for the remaining 20 per cent."

== Closure of the Yellow Car system ==
When the Yellow Cars stopped running in 1963, the building located along the city's old Mexican marketplace, Olvera Street, was converted to other uses. However, critics of the structure argued it was out of keeping with the pre-1900 flavor of Olvera Street and sought to remove it. In 1971, the Pueblo park's historian, Dr. Doyce Nunis, issued a report stating that the substation had "no identifiable historic value". Dr. Nunis wrote: "There was no identifiable distinguished architect involved (and) the design was commonplace."

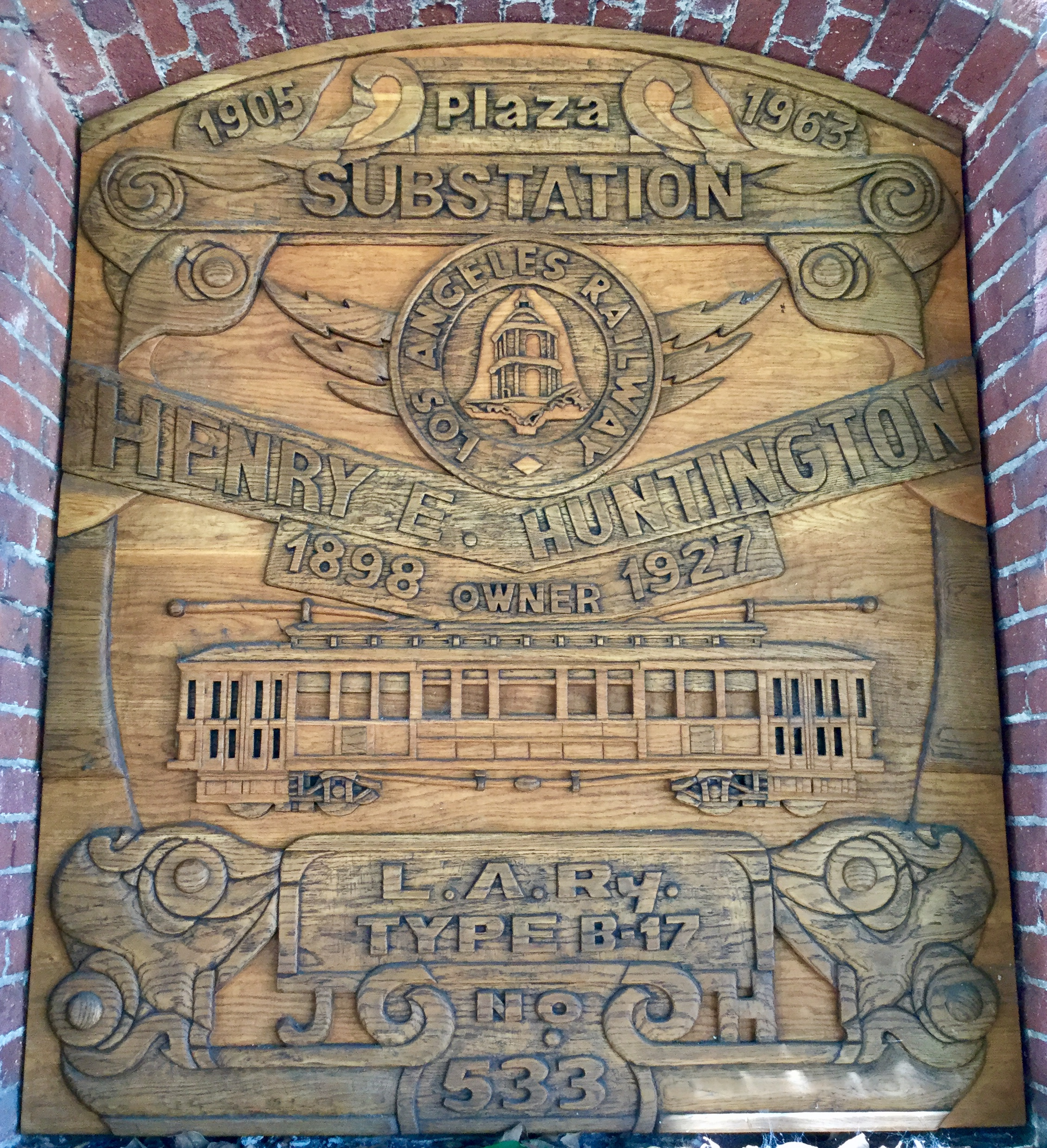
Hand-Carved Window Covering

== Debate over preservation ==
After receiving the historian's report, the city's Recreation and Parks Commission (with the support of Mayor Tom Bradley) voted 4-1 to demolish the building and replace it with a Mexican market and storage facility. At that point, Los Angeles Times architecture writer John Pastier published an article titled: "How Do You Make a Historical Monument? Tear Down a Historic Building?" Pastier noted that the Plaza Substation was the largest and most distinctive of the three surviving Yellow Car substations and urged the city to adapt the utilitarian structure into a tasteful tourist attraction as San Francisco had done with Ghirardelli Square and the Cannery. The State Park Department's director also stepped in opposing what he called the city's plan to turn the historic park into an amusement park. However, even the writers at the Times were divided over preservation of the substation, as another columnist sided with the city and wrote:

"Saving the MTA Powerhouse in the Plaza is another debatable project. Is it worth a continuing place along Olvera Street because it was a substation for our early transit system? Because it survives as a sturdy example of good contractor's performance? Because it sits near so much important history? I think the substation is an excellent example of the way conserving can become a disease."

A group called Californians for Preservation Action filed a lawsuit seeking to prevent the building's demolition, and a state court judge issued a restraining order halting the demolition. Ultimately, the Plaza Substation was saved, and funds set aside for its rehabilitation, as part of a settlement agreement reached in 1978.

== Historic designation ==
The substation is one of the two buildings in the Los Angeles Plaza Historic District that is itself separately listed in the National Register of Historic Places, having been so listed in September 1978.

== See also ==
- Los Angeles Plaza Historic District
- List of Registered Historic Places in Los Angeles
