= F (Los Angeles Railway) =

Streetcar route (1911–1955)

Overview
- Owner: Los Angeles Railway
- Locale: Los Angeles
- Termini: Union Station; Vermont and Manchester Avenues, Vermont and 116th St
- Stations: 28

Service
- Type: Streetcar
- System: Los Angeles Railway
- Daily ridership: 12,851 (1940)

History
- Opened: May 9, 1920
- Closed: May 22, 1955

Technical
- Track gauge: 3 ft 6 in (1,067 mm)
- Electrification: Overhead line, 600 V DC

F was a streetcar line in Los Angeles, California. It was operated by the Los Angeles Railway from 1911 to 1955.

== History ==
=== Fourth Street Line (1898–1911) ===
The Fourth Street Line was originally built by the Los Angeles Traction Company. The first car operated over the line on November 30, 1898 (barely meeting the franchise's terms for operating date), with regular service starting on January 4, 1899. This route ran from a Downtown terminus at 3rd Street and Stephenson Avenue (present-day Traction Avenue) to 1st Street by way of Boyle Heights in the roadways of Stephenson, Merrick Street, 4th Street, and Fresno Street.

In 1910, the LAIU was taken over by the Pacific Electric Railway who ran it as a local line for one year, extending the route to 4th and Hill by way of 3rd and Hill Streets.

=== Sunnyside Division (1888–1911) ===
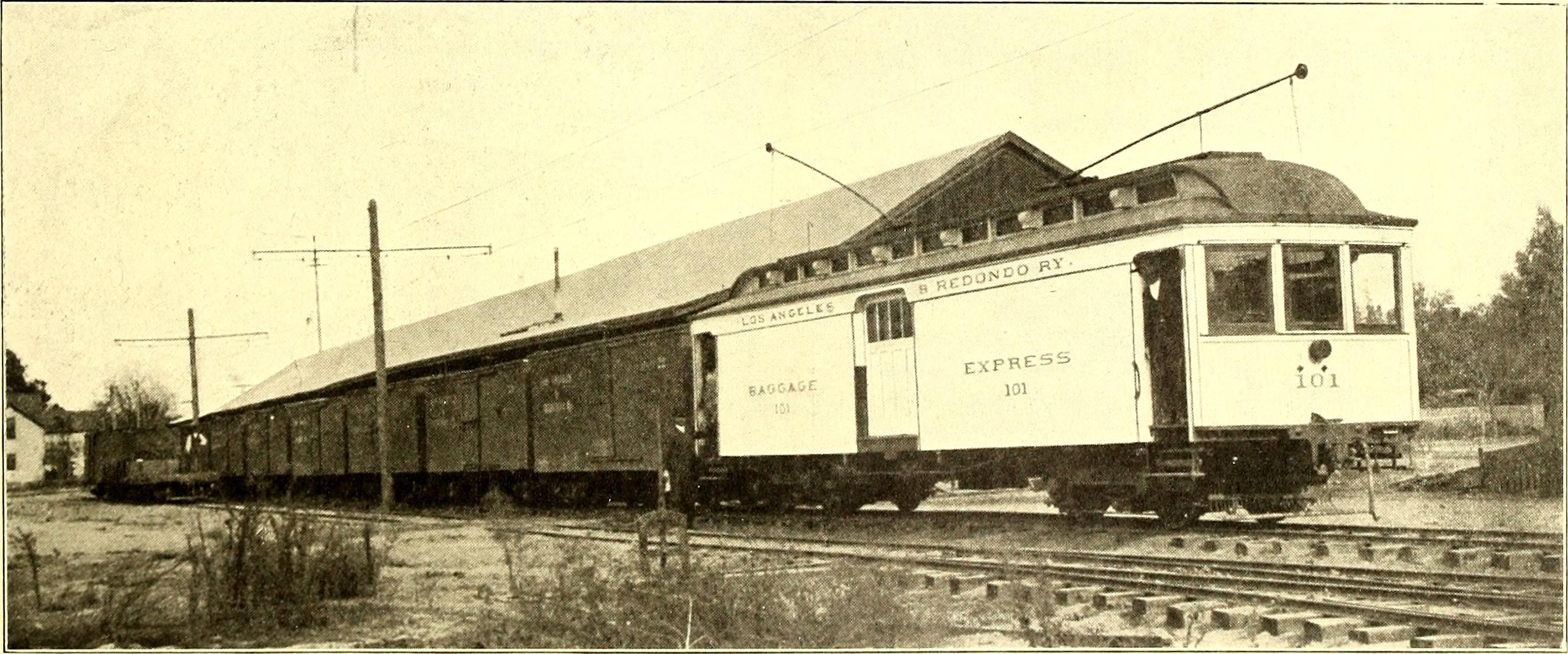
Los Angeles and Redondo Railway freight train, 1884

The Sunnyside Division was the second division to be built by the Los Angeles and Redondo Railway. From the LA&R terminus at 2nd and Spring Streets, the Sunnyside Line ran to Redondo Beach by way of 2nd Street, Broadway, 7th Street, Grand Avenue, Santa Barbara Avenue, Sunnyside Avenue (present-day South Hoover), a private right of way between 69th Street and Florence Avenue, Vermont Avenue, 166th Street, Redondo Beach Boulevard, Ripley Avenue, and Anita Street.

During the Great Merger of 1911 the southern portion of the LA&R was incorporated into the Pacific Electric Railway, while the northern portion became local routes of the Los Angeles Railway. At this point, the Fourth Street and Sunnyside Lines were merged into a single route.

=== F Line (1911–1955) ===
LARy streamlined the Fourth Street and Sunnyside Lines, avoiding Stephenson Avenue entirely and running the Downtown segment through Main Street. The new route followed Fresno Street, 4th Street, Main Street, Jefferson Boulevard, Grand Avenue, Hoover Avenue, a private right of way, and Vermont Avenue, terminating at Manchester Avenue, where a less frequent shuttle could be taken to the Pacific Electric's Delta station. In 1920, the shuttle was eliminated; the main line ran all the way to Delta. The route was given the letter designation "F" the following year. Rebuilding of the Fourth Street Viaduct over the Los Angeles River between 1930 and 1931 required substantial rerouting and shuttle services to facilitate continued service. In 1947 the Hoover section was eliminated, and the F car ran straight from Santa Barbara to Vermont Avenues.

==== Reroute to Union Station ====
In 1949, ten years after the opening of Union Station, F cars were rerouted to terminate at a loop segment on the steam railway terminal's north side. The 4th street track was eliminated, and the new loop connected to the remainder of the route by way of Macy Street and Main Street.

Discontinuation of the line was considered as early as 1947, when residents along the route collected 5,000 signatures in a petition to maintain operations. Streetcar service ceased on May 22, 1955 and the line was converted to bus operations.

== Partial restoration ==
Vermont Avenue continued its growth, seeded by the robust public transportation provided by the streetcar. By 2020, the bus lines operating on the street had grown to ridership of 45,000 weekday boardings, making it the second busiest corridor in the network. As a result, Los Angeles County Metropolitan Transportation Authority intends to rehabilitate the road for to allow for rapid transit. The corridor extends further south than the old V streetcar and may initially operate as bus rapid transit with more limited service than its progenitor. The Vermont Transit Corridor covers the southern portion of the Los Angeles Railway F line streetcar to Vermont Av. & 116th St, Delta terminus, now at I-105 freeway at the Vermont/Athens station on the Metro C line.

== See also ==
- Streetcars in Los Angeles
