= E Train =

E Train may refer to:

== Rail transportation ==
- E (New York City Subway service), a subway service in New York City
- E Line (Los Angeles Metro), a light rail line in Los Angeles County, California
- eTrain (Miami International Airport), an automated people mover at Miami International Airport
- Green Line E branch, a streetcar line in Boston, Massachusetts

== Other ==
- Electron transport chain

== See also ==
- E-line (disambiguation)
