= 5 (Los Angeles Railway) =

Overview
- Other name: E (1920–1932)
- Owner: Los Angeles Metropolitan Transit Authority
- Locale: Los Angeles, Inglewood, Lennox, and Hawthorne
- Termini: Colorado Boulevard and Townsend Street (1920–48) Colorado Boulevard and Eagle Rock Boulevard (1948–55); Hawthorne Boulevard and Broadway (Hawthorne)
- Stations: 112

Service
- Type: Streetcar
- System: Los Angeles Railway (1920–45); Los Angeles Transit Lines (1945–58); Los Angeles Metropolitan Transit Authority (1958–63)
- Daily ridership: 15,988 (1940)

History
- Opened: 1920
- Closed: May 22, 1955

Technical
- Line length: 21.8 mi (35.1 km) (1920–48); 21.4 mi (34.4 km) (1948–55)
- Track gauge: 3 ft 6 in (1,067 mm)
- Electrification: Overhead line, 600 V DC

5 or the 5 Car was a streetcar line operated by the Los Angeles Railway, later named as the Los Angeles Transit Lines, by the Los Angeles Metropolitan Transit Authority. From 1920 to 1932, this route was known as the E Car. This was changed as part of a method to distinguish routes that lacked loops at their termini. Consequently, the 5 Car was unique during the LAMTA era in that it did not use PCC streetcars. It used buses from 1955 to 1964, transferring from LATL in 1958, then splitting the line in two in 1961, until all lines were turned over to SCRTD in August 1964.

== History ==
=== Inglewood Division (1887–1911) ===
Initially a steam railroad built in 1887, the southern portion of the route began as the Inglewood Division, one of the main lines of the Los Angeles and Redondo Railway. The railroad rebuilt and electrified the route in 1902. From a terminus at 2nd and Spring Streets, railroad ran to Redondo Beach via 2nd Street, Broadway, 7th Street, Grand Avenue, Santa Barbara Avenue, Leimert Avenue, Crenshaw Boulevard, Redondo Boulevard, Florence Avenue, Market Street, La Brea Avenue, Hawthorne Boulevard, Ripley Avenue, Anita Street, and Herondo Street.

In the Great Merger of 1911, the southern portion of the Redondo Railway were given over to the Pacific Electric Railway, while the northern portion became part of the Los Angeles Railway. The Hawthorne Line, as it was then called, terminated at the intersection of Hawthorne Boulevard and Broadway in the heart of Hawthorne, where one could transfer to two Pacific Electric routes. At some point in the 1910s, this route was merged with the Eagle Rock Line to become the longest streetcar route in the United States.

=== Eagle Rock Line (1906–1920) ===
The Eagle Rock Line was one of LARy's original routes, connecting Downtown Los Angeles to the small agrarian suburb of Eagle Rock by way of Main Street, Avenue 20, Dayton Avenue, a private right-of-way (on which was soon built Avenue 28), Eagle Rock Boulevard, and Colorado Boulevard to Townsend Street. At Eagle Rock and Colorado, one could transfer to a branch of the Glendale and Montrose Railway. Grading of the line commenced on February 5, 1906, with regular service beginning on the following August 20.

In 1916, the renovation of the Broadway Tunnel allowed streetcars to run through it. Before this, all routes northeast had to run along Main Street at the Plaza de los Angeles, but now all of Broadway enjoyed direct, continuous service. It was along Broadway that the Eagle Rock Line was re-routed, bypassing most of Lincoln Heights, while increasing service to Solano Canyon and Little Italy.

=== E, 5, and 6 (1920–1963) ===
Geographic map; 5 is in magenta

The E Line was the result of combining the Eagle Rock and Hawthorne Lines. At nearly 22 miles (35 km), it was the longest route of the Los Angeles Railway by far, and the route that extended further north, south, east or west than any other route. The route traversed a private right of way in Eagle Rock; Avenue 28; Dayton; San Fernando Road; Pasadena Avenue; North Broadway; Sunset; North Main; North Spring; First; Broadway; Broadway Place; Main; Jefferson Boulevard; Grand; another private right of way; Santa Barbara; and a final private right of way to Hawthorne.

In 1932, the route name was changed to 5. An additional line designated as 6 followed the same route, but short turned at Avenue 45 in Eagle Rock and Arbor Vitae in Inglewood and ran until 1937.

In 1948, the northern terminus of the route was cut back to the intersection of Colorado Boulevard and Eagle Rock Boulevards in the heart of Eagle Rock. From this period onward, a bus following the same route supplemented the streetcar. Streetcar service was discontinued on May 22, 1955 due to Harbor Freeway construction.

=== After rail service ===
The 5 bus route was split by LAMTA in 1961, the north portion to Eagle Rock Boulevard and Colorado Boulevard was served by route 7 from South Broadway. The 5 had its number changed to 40 by the Southern California Rapid Transit District in 1984 in anticipation of the 1984 Olympic Games.

As of 2022, the route is closely followed by Metro bus routes 40, 84, and a short segment of 81. The Metro K Line follows the same route between Leimert Park and Market Street in Inglewood.

== Rolling stock ==
Type H cars were refurbished between November 1930 and January 1931, for use on the line. (Type H cars had originally been designed for service on the E Line in 1920, but were used elsewhere in the network after having tested poorly on the route shortly after delivery.)

== See also ==
- Streetcars in Los Angeles
