= N (Los Angeles Railway) =

Los Angeles Railway route

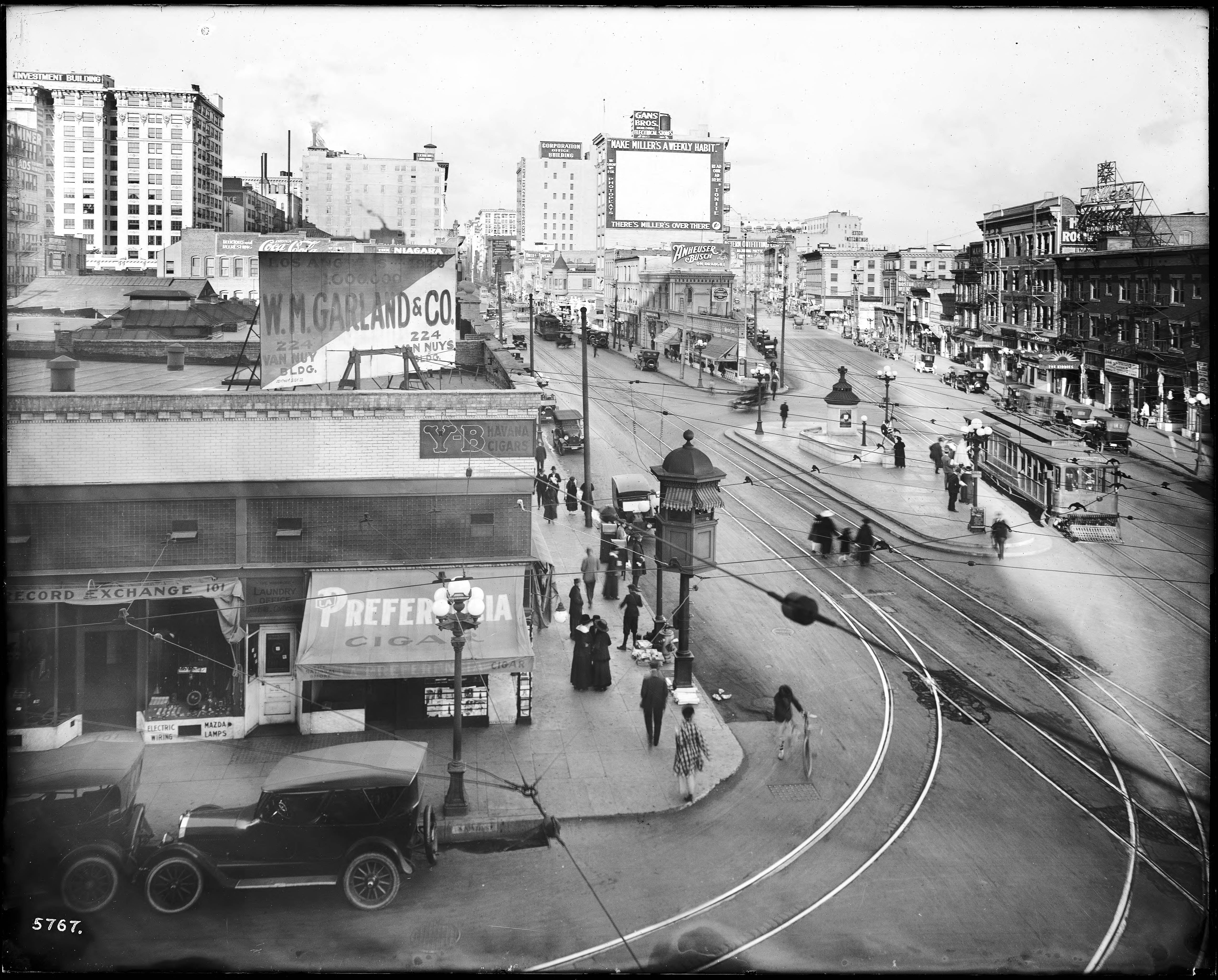
- Main, Spring (center of frame), and 9th (bottom of frame), where the N takes a turn. c. 1917

Overview
- Locale: Los Angeles
- Termini: Spring and 2nd Street; 8th Street and Western Avenue
- Stations: 21

Service
- Type: Streetcar
- System: Los Angeles Railway

History
- Opened: 1905
- Closed: September 10, 1950

Technical
- Track gauge: 3 ft 6 in (1,067 mm)
- Electrification: Overhead line, 600 V DC

N was a streetcar line in Los Angeles, California. It was operated by the Los Angeles Railway from 1920 to 1950. The line ran from Spring and 2nd Streets to 8th Street and Western Avenue, by way of Spring Street, 9th Street, Vermont Avenue, and 8th Street.

== History ==
The Ninth Street Line was built by the Los Angeles Railway in 1895 and ran via Spring Street, 9th Street, and Park View to a junction with the Lincoln Heights Line at 10th and Hoover Streets. From there both routes ran along West 10th Street to a terminus at Vermont Avenue. Circa 1911, the Park View section was eliminated and the route was extended along 9th Street, Vermont, and 8th Street to a loop at Western Avenue.

In 1920, the line was rerouted, operating from 8th and Harvard via 8th; Vermont; 9th; Spring; 2nd; Traction Way; 3rd; and Santa Fe to 2nd, terminating at the Los Angeles Atchison, Topeka and Santa Fe Railway station. It was given the letter designation N in 1921.

Tracks were laid on a newly-rebuilt Spring Street in June 1932, extending the line to the Sunset Boulevard Plaza. Cars were temporarily routed to Union Station as the line's northern terminal between May 1939 and June 1946. In 1950 the route was removed, though the 8th Street section of the line continued to run as part of the re-routed S line.

== See also ==
- Streetcars in Los Angeles
