= Glendale and Montrose Railway =

Interurban railways in California

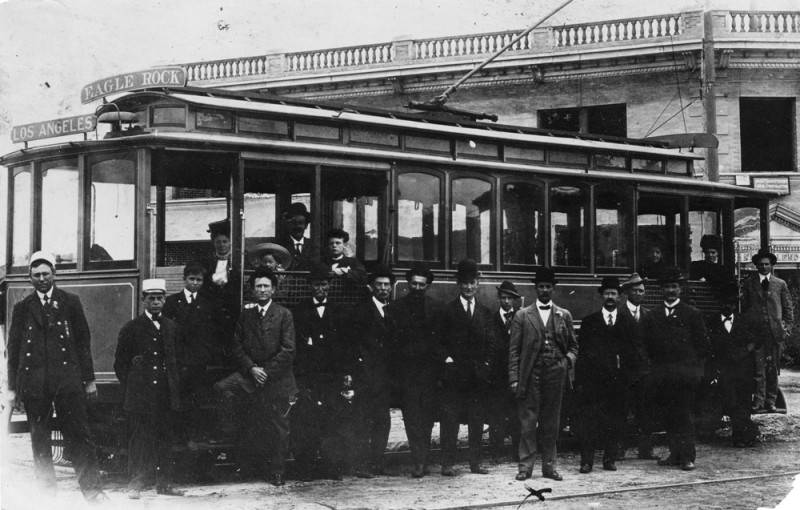
The first run from Glendale to Eagle Rock in 1909, under the company's original name: the Glendale and Eagle Rock Railway

The Glendale and Montrose Railway Company (G&M) was an interurban electrified railway in Southern California, in the United States. It was unique among the Los Angeles local railways, as it was among the area's only interurban line never absorbed into the expansive Pacific Electric system.

== History ==
The railway began service from Glendale to Eagle Rock on March 13, 1909, as the Glendale and Eagle Rock Railway. The streetcar ran from Glendale Avenue and Wilson to the east, veering to the south to join Broadway and then Colorado Boulevard, terminating at Glassell Boulevard (later Eagle Rock Boulevard) where it offered a connection to the Los Angeles Railway Eagle Rock Line. Real estate developers in Montrose acquired the company in 1913 with the intent of extending the line to their newly constructed community. Cars first ran to Montrose on April 26, 1913 and then as far as La Crescenta later that year. The name was changed to the Glendale and Montrose Railway in 1914.

The railway entered into a joint trackage agreement with the Pacific Electric in 1914, whereby each would own one track on Broadway between Glendale Boulevard and Brand Boulevard in Glendale, and both would operate over the new double track streetcar line. The tracks were widened to standard gauge in 1915 and 1916, allowing interchanges with other railroads. A joint service was briefly established with the Pacific Electric, allowing cars originating in La Crescenta to run to the Pacific Electric Building via the Glendale–Burbank Line and interchange with the larger railroad's network. The service lasted less than a year, from October 1916 to the following September. In February 1924 the Glendale and Montrose trolleys traversed newly electrified Union Pacific (UP) tracks to reach Los Angeles. The city of Glendale contributed funding for the electrification to reduce the impact of steam trains through the town.

The population along the route in the early 1900s was too low to support frequent passenger service. The railway ceased operation at the end of 1930, and the Union Pacific took over the remaining tracks in 1931. A few years later, UP converted the ex-G&M trackage from electric to diesel. Tracks were connected to the Southern Pacific Coast Line in 1938 and freight trains continued to use the line, known as the Glendale branch, until November 1986. The Glendale Avenue segment was abandoned in 1956. Union Pacific abandoned the last remaining section of the railroad after 1991, and the right-of-way was subdivided and sold off.

== Rolling stock ==
The company acquired three single-truck Birney cars in 1918. Initially sporting a red livery, the cars were given white accents in 1927 to differentiate them from Pacific Electric's Red Cars.

=== Preserved equipment ===
One of the electric locomotives of the Glendale & Montrose has been preserved in the collection of the Southern California Railway Museum. G&M No. 22, a 1923 Baldwin-Westinghouse boxcab locomotive, became UP No. E100 after Union Pacific acquired the G&M. In 1942, after UP ceased electric operation on the former G&M tracks, No. E100 was sold to a Union Pacific subsidiary in Washington, the Yakima Valley Transportation Company (YVT). It became YVT No. 297 and continued in use in Yakima for many years. When retired, in 1985, the locomotive was donated to the Orange Empire Railway Museum.

== See also ==
- Streetcars in Los Angeles
