= Los Angeles Streetcar =

Planned streetcar system for Downtown Los Angeles

Overview
- Status: In planning
- Stations: 16
- Website: fastlinkdtla.org/la-streetcar/

Service
- Type: Streetcar
- Operator(s): Los Angeles Streetcar, Inc.

Technical
- Character: Surface, in-street running
- Track gauge: 4 ft 8 1/2 in (1,435 mm) standard gauge

The Los Angeles Streetcar is a planned, partly-funded electric streetcar that would return a single route to Downtown Los Angeles. The Los Angeles Railway streetcar system served the area in the earlier part of the 20th century.

== History ==
During the mid-1990s the notion of bringing streetcars back to Los Angeles began being explored. Over the years various entities and officials were involved with this unfolding process that eventually centered on downtown. Congresswoman Lucille Roybal-Allard secured $100,000 for a feasibility study released in September 2006. Then in 2008 it was endorsed by Councilman José Huizar as part of his Bringing Back Broadway initiative, providing it an influential backer.

In May 2011, the Los Angeles County Metropolitan Transportation Authority (Metro), the city of Los Angeles, and several stakeholders began conducting studies and holding public meetings to explore the feasibility of restoring streetcar service downtown. According to Metro the streetcar restoration effort would further the ongoing revitalization of Downtown Los Angeles's Historic Core and connect people to employment centers, shopping districts, civic resources, cultural institutions, historic landmarks and entertainment venues within the project study area.

After narrowing it down to seven possible alignments for initial consideration, further study resulted in one alignment being chosen as the Locally Preferred Alternative in January 2012. This alignment would travel on Grand Avenue, 1st Street, Broadway, 11th Street, Figueroa Street, 7th Street, and Hill Street, though a second alternative including an alignment on 9th Street instead of 7th Street was also included – thus two Build Alternatives were to be studied further for potential development. A Draft Environmental Impact Report/Environmental Assessment (Draft EIR/EA) for these two Build Alternatives was expected to be released to the public in spring 2014.

As of July 2017, the project had secured at least $390 million in local funding and was expected to begin operation no later than 2021. A property tax district created along its proposed route, approved in 2012, would provide $62.5 million to $80 million. Measure M, a new local sales tax, provides $200 million for the project but the funding would not be available until 2053. In July 2018, the city of Los Angeles Bureau of Engineering released the Environmental Assessment for public comment. By this point the 9th St. alternative was no longer being considered. The public hearing for comments had a sparse turnout.

The Los Angeles City Council on Aug. 15, 2018, approved a Funding Plan for the project, directed staff to apply for a Small Starts federal grant and also submit a proposal to Metro for the funding from Measure M to be accelerated.

== See also ==
- Streetcars in North America
- Los Angeles Railway
- Pacific Electric
- OC Streetcar
