= W (Los Angeles Railway) =

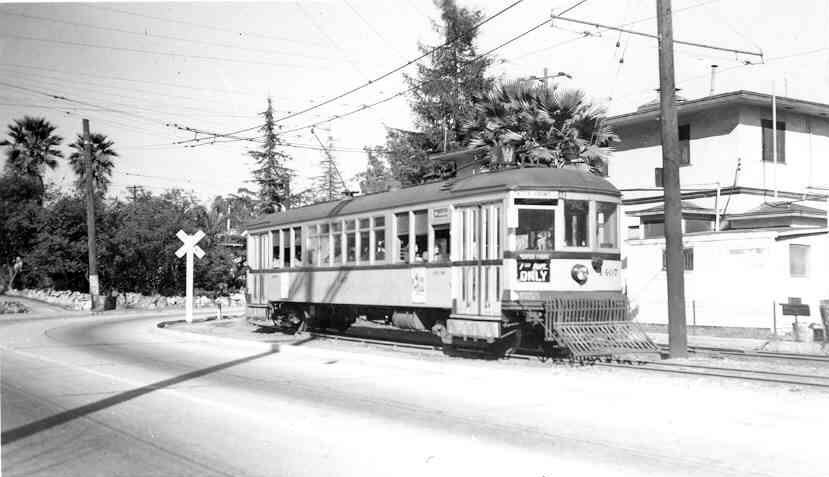
- No. 1407 crosses Marmion Way, c. 1930s

Overview
- Locale: Los Angeles
- Termini: Piedmont and Pasadena (1895–1911) Eagle Rock Park (1911–48) York and Avenue 50 (1922–55) Broadway and Lincoln Park (1955–56); 22nd and Western (1895–1911) Washington and Rimpau Boulevards (1911–1956)
- Stations: 62

Service
- Type: Streetcar
- System: Los Angeles Railway
- Daily ridership: 19,249 (1940)

History
- Opened: 1895
- Closed: November 18, 1956

Technical
- Track gauge: 3 ft 6 in (1,067 mm)
- Electrification: Overhead line, 600 V DC

W was a streetcar line in Los Angeles, California. It was operated by the Los Angeles Railway (LARy) from 1895 to 1956.

== History ==
The Washington Line was one of the first to be built by LARy. The Maple Street Line was the first electric railway in Los Angeles, built by the Los Angeles Electric Railway Company — this line was taken over by the Los Angeles Consolidated Railway and in turn acquired by LARy in 1895. A former horsecar route, the Los Angeles Consolidated Railway, was acquired by the Los Angeles Railway and electrified for streetcar service in 1895, dubbed the Kuhrts Street–Eastlake Park Line. These were merged in 1902 to form the Maple Avenue and East Lake Park Line. Its northern terminus was at the intersection of Piedmont Street and Pasadena Avenue in Garvanza. This segment of the route closely followed the Arroyo Seco, ATSF main line, Los Angeles Terminal Pasadena branch, and Los Angeles and Pasadena Railway, stopping quite close to Highland Park Station. From there, it entered Downtown Los Angeles by way of Piedmont, Avenue 61, Monte Vista Street, Marmion Way, Dayton Avenue, Avenue 20, Main Street, Tenth Street, Flower Street, Washington Boulevard, La Salle Street, and 22nd Street to a terminus at 22nd and Western Avenue.

In 1911, the route was extended along Washington Boulevard to Rimpau Boulevard. The section of track on 22nd Street and La Salle was kept as a shuttle route until 1921. At the northeast end, an extension was built along Eagle Rock Avenue to Buena Vista Terrace. In 1919, the Tenth Street segment was eliminated and streetcar tracks were built through the Broadway Tunnel, enabling the line to bypass Main Street entirely, and instead run through Downtown Los Angeles by way of Broadway, 11th Street, and Flower Street. In 1921, it was renamed "W."

Around 1922, a branch line was built from Pasadena Avenue up York Boulevard to Avenue 50, and was quite popular. In 1948, the Annandale section was abandoned and York Boulevard became the sole northern terminus. In 1955, the entire northeastern segment of the route was abandoned and the W line then ran east via Broadway to Lincoln Park Avenue. The entire route was abandoned a year later on November 18, 1956, with replacement bus service becoming the 12 Line.

== See also ==
- Streetcars in Los Angeles
