= S (Los Angeles Railway) =

Overview
- Owner: Los Angeles Metropolitan Transit Authority
- Locale: Los Angeles
- Termini: Western Avenue and Santa Monica Boulevard; Central Avenue and Firestone Boulevard
- Stations: 67

Service
- Type: Streetcar
- System: Los Angeles Railway, Los Angeles Metropolitan Transit Authority
- Rolling stock: PCC streetcars
- Daily ridership: 21,230 (1940)

History
- Opened: 1898
- Closed: March 31, 1963

Technical
- Line length: 12.41 mi (19.97 km)
- Track gauge: 3 ft 6 in (1,067 mm)
- Electrification: Overhead line, 600 V DC

S was a streetcar line in Los Angeles, California. Early parts of the line opened in 1898 under the Main, Fifth and San Pedro Railway, an arm of the Los Angeles Railway. After the rerouting of Yellow Car lines in 1920, the service acquired its letter designation. Los Angeles railway operated the service until 1958, then by the Los Angeles Metropolitan Transit Authority from 1958 to 1963. The route was very popular due to its proximity to Hollywood as well as the sizable manufacturing district in South Los Angeles.

== History ==
=== San Pedro Line ===
The Main, Fifth and San Pedro Railway constructed a streetcar line on its namesake streets in 1898.

=== Eleventh Street Line ===
Beginning in September 1910, the Los Angeles Railway rerouted several cars though downtown to relieve congestion. The North Main and West Eleventh Street car line, formerly operating in Hoover and West Eleventh Streets and via Broadway, Spring and Main Streets to Eastside Park, began running west from Hoover Street in Tenth Street to Gramercy Place, then the terminal of the West Eleventh Street Line. In October 1917, work began on an extension west to Los Angeles High School.

=== S Line (1911–1963) ===
With the great rerouting of 1920, a new curve at Seventh and San Pedro was required to connect the San Pedro Line with the Western Avenue line. A delay in procuring materials delayed construction until a few weeks after other lines had changed routes. The San Pedro line then ran from San Pedro Street to Seventh Street from Downtown to the outskirts of Westlake. Here, the route took advantage of an old LAIU track on Hoover, Wilshire, and Commonwealth to continue northwest via Sixth Street, Vermont Avenue, Third Street, and Western Avenue to Santa Monica Boulevard on the southern edge of Hollywood. That same year, both ends of the line were extended. The south end was extended on Avalon, Merrill (Gage), Merrill, and Central Avenue to 68th and the north side on Western Avenue to Santa Monica Boulevard. In 1921, the route was given the letter designation "S."

During the LARy and LATL eras, further route changes were made. The LAIU shortcut to Sixth Street was eliminated and the route ran straight on 7th between San Pedro and Vermont, while the route's southern terminus was extended 1.25 miles (2.01 km) further south to the intersection of Avalon and Firestone Boulevard. When the N line was decommissioned in 1950, S was re-routed to fill in its route along 8th street.

Operation of the line passed to the Los Angeles Metropolitan Transit Authority in 1958. Streetcar service ended on March 31, 1963, by which time the southern terminus had become Central and Manchester Avenue.

== Rolling stock ==
After 1955, PCC streetcars replaced the old rolling stock on the line.

== See also ==
- Streetcars in Los Angeles
