= Los Angeles Railway =

Electric interurban railway in Los Angeles, California

Overview
- Locale: Los Angeles, California and its suburbs
- Transit type: Streetcar
- Number of lines: 25

Operation
- Began operation: 1895
- Ended operation: 1958 (ceded to LAMTA); 1963 (rail operations ceased)
- Operator: Los Angeles Railway
- Reporting marks: LARy

Technical
- Track gauge: 3 ft 6 in (1,067 mm)
- Electrification: Overhead line, 600 V DC
Map

The Los Angeles Railway (also known as Yellow Cars, LARy and later Los Angeles Transit Lines) was a system of streetcars that operated in Central Los Angeles and surrounding neighborhoods between 1895 and 1963. The system provided frequent local services which complemented the Pacific Electric's interurban "Red Car" routes. The Los Angeles Railway carried many more passengers than the Pacific Electric, which served a larger and sparser area of Los Angeles, Orange County, and the Inland Empire.

Cars operated on 3 ft 6 in (1,067 mm) narrow gauge tracks, and shared dual gauge trackage with the 4 ft 8 1/2 in (1,435 mm) standard gauge Pacific Electric system on Main Street in downtown Los Angeles (directly in front of the 6th and Main terminal), on Hill St, on 7th St, on 4th Street, and along Hawthorne Boulevard south of Downtown Los Angeles.

== History ==
=== Non-electric predecessors ===
The earliest horsecar railway in Los Angeles, the Spring and Sixth Street Railroad, was built in 1874 by Robert M. Widney, and ran from the Los Angeles Plaza area to Sixth and Pearl (Figueroa Street). Not much later, this line would be extended northeast to East Los Angeles (now Lincoln Park). A more ambitious horse-driven line was the Main Street and Agricultural Park Railroad, which ran from the Plaza area, south on Main Street, to Washington Gardens and then to Agricultural (Exposition) Park.

The first cable car system to open in Los Angeles was the Second Street Cable Railway. Opened in 1885, it ran west from Second and Spring Streets out First Street to Texas Street (Belmont Avenue).

Each of these early railroads were built to further the sale of real estate that was considered too far away from the downtown area.

The Los Angeles Cable Railway (later named the Pacific Cable Railway, and incorporated in Illinois) owned many exclusive franchises (agreements with the city to use public streets for transportation purposes) and by 1889 had constructed four major cable lines crisscrossing the growing downtown area, from Jefferson and Grand to East Los Angeles (Lincoln Heights), and from Westlake Park to Boyle Heights.

Though considered the latest in cable railway technology, construction was expensive, legal and operating problems plagued the system, and a rising new electric railway technology threatened to make the system obsolete.

=== Predecessor: Electric Railways ===
The first electric railway in Los Angeles was built in 1887 to facilitate the sales of a real estate tract on Pico Street. The Los Angeles Electric Railway used the early Daft overhead system with a crude electric car and trailers. Though the real estate venture was successful, after an explosion in the power station, the Pico Street electric line closed, seemingly for good.

Development of an effective electric transportation system based on the new Sprague-based technology began in earnest with the arrival in Los Angeles of Moses Sherman, his brother-in-law Eli P. Clark and San Francisco investors late in 1890. Sherman, originally a teacher from Vermont, had moved to the Arizona territory in 1874 where he was involved in business and civic affairs, real estate, and street railways. Clark, too, came from the Arizona territory, and was similarly involved in business and civic affairs.

Sherman became interested in opportunities in Los Angeles after vacationing there in early 1890. He joined the efforts of a group attempting to resurrect the Second Street Cable Railway, but persuaded them to electrify the line instead. He acquired the line in October, 1890 and renamed it The Belt Line Railroad Company.

Sherman created an Arizona corporation called The Los Angeles Consolidated Electric Railway Company (LACE) on November 12, 1890 with Sherman as President and Clark as General Manager. Future mayor Frederick Eaton was chosen as Chief Engineer. The firm was incorporated in Arizona because Arizona incorporation held certain advantages over incorporating in California.

In the autumn of 1890, the legislature passed the so-called 5-block law, which enabled a street railway company to use another company's rails for up to five city blocks. This would help Sherman immensely with his plans for LACE, but later would be used against him.

Sherman and Clark began work immediately. In 1891 alone, they accomplished the following:

- After using the Pico Street facilities for a short time, they constructed a new power house, car house and shops at the intersection of Central Avenue and Wilde Street, east of the business district.
- Purchased the Depot Line on May 8, which ran from Second and Spring Streets to the Santa Fe Depot and to the Southern Pacific depot.
- Opened a line from Second and Spring Streets, past Crown Hill, to Westlake Park on July 1, replacing the Second Street Cable line.
- Acquired the Los Angeles and Vernon Street Railway, whose horsecar line ran down Central Avenue to Slauson, then connected to the Santa Fe Ballona branch. They opened it as an electric line on September 16.
- Built a new line to serve the University of Southern California and Agricultural Park; the new University line opened November 12.
- Opened the Maple Avenue Line in November and the newly rebuilt and re-electrified Pico Street line on December 31.

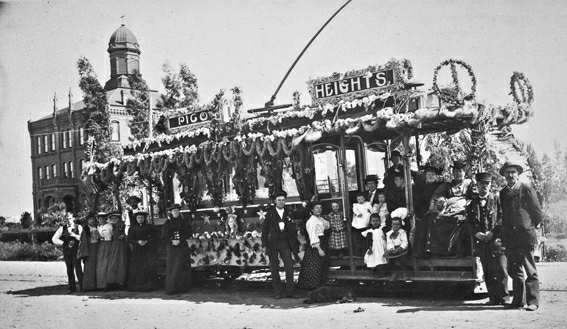
Los Angeles Consolidated Electric streetcar at Pico Heights, decorated for Washington's Birthday, c. 1892.

By the end of 1891, the railway had five electric lines running, all which used a 3-foot 6-inch gauge, which matched the gauge used by the cable lines: Crown Hill, University, Maple Avenue, Central Avenue and Pico Street.

Pacific Railway’s problems were such that the company was thrown into receivership in 1891, with James F. Crank was appointed as receiver.

In 1892, Sherman and Clark electrified the Depot Line, and opened it on August 1. They extended the Crown Hill line east to the Santa Fe La Grande station, and also connected to the Southern Pacific Arcade station on Central. They also started a line to East Los Angeles (Eastlake Park) in 1892, laying track on North Spring and North Broadway Streets. They were forced to build a bridge over the Los Angeles River and Santa Fe rails, which postponed the opening of the line until September 26, 1893.

The growth of the electric lines put severe pressure on the Pacific Cable Railway. The two rail companies began negotiations to possibly combine in August, 1892, but foreclosure and sale was their only option. On October 4, 1893, the sale of the Pacific Cable Railway was completed, and LACE acquired all of the assets, including their cable and horsecar lines.

LACE was now the largest street railway operator in Los Angeles, owning about 90% of all lines. By the end of 1893, they had 14 lines, with a total of 38.325 route-miles of electric lines including Crown Hill, Central Avenue, University, Maple Avenue, Pico Street, Depot, and East Los Angeles: 20.5 miles of cable lines, including Boyle Heights/Westlake Park, and East Los Angeles/Grand Avenue, and 9.09 miles of horsecar lines, including West Ninth Street, Washington Boulevard, and North Main Street. With a total of 68 miles of track, they owned 80% of the trackage in Los Angeles.

Then things began to get more “complicated”. Sherman and Clark faced difficulties and distractions. A national depression, begun in 1893, affected Los Angeles as well. As patronage declined, Sherman and Clark cut service on the system.

In 1894, a direct competitor to LACE arrived. William S. Hook, a banker and railroad executive from Illinois, incorporated a new electric street railway company, the Los Angeles Traction Company, and secured a franchise for a line headquartered at Georgia Street and 12th Street, which was destined to provide stiff competition to LACE. Hook’s first line opened in February, 1896.

In 1894, Sherman and Clark began an inter-urban line between LA and Pasadena, The Los Angeles and Pasadena Railway, and acquired all the street railways in Pasadena.

=== Creation of Los Angeles Railway (1895) ===
In April, 1894 LACE missed a scheduled bond payment. The bondholders, unhappy with Sherman and Clark's management and their attention to their new interurban railway, secured control of the railway. Sherman managed to retain 49% of the outstanding stock, but he and Clark no longer had any management responsibilities. The bondholders created a new corporation called the Los Angeles Railway (LARy) and March 23, 1895 LARy acquired all of LACE’s assets, except for the Los Angeles and Pacific Railway and the Pasadena street railways. The new management purchased new cars and began converting all the existing horsecar and cable lines to electricity, a task completed by June, 1896.

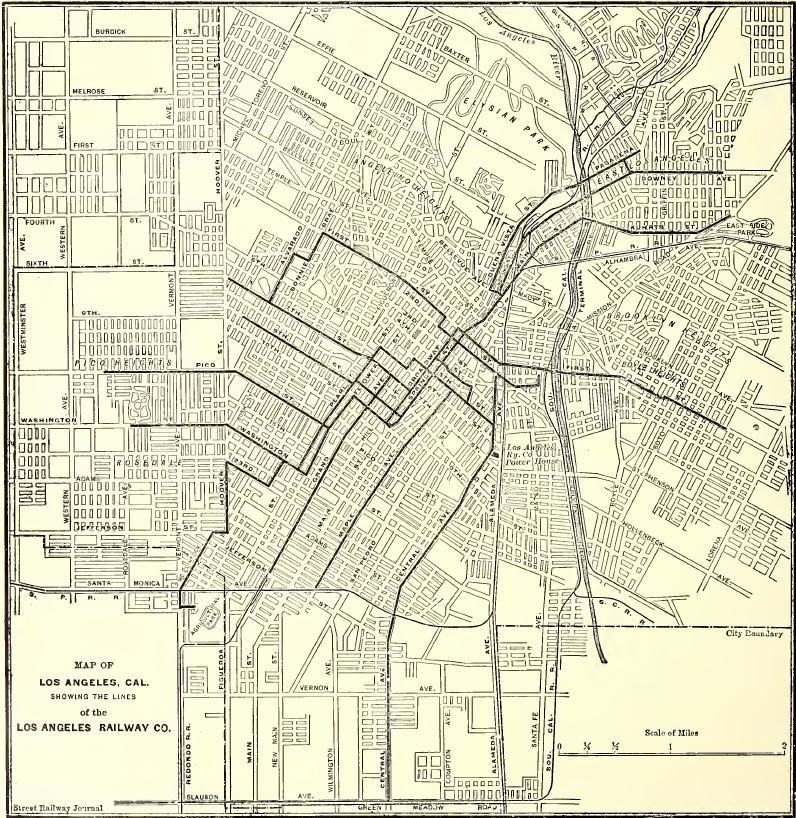
LARy 1898 Route Map

=== Purchase by Huntington (1898) ===
The system was purchased by a syndicate led by railroad and real estate tycoon Henry E. Huntington in 1898. At its height, the system contained over 20 streetcar lines and 1,250 streetcars, most running through the core of Los Angeles and serving such neighborhoods as Crenshaw, West Adams, Leimert Park, Exposition Park, Echo Park, Westlake, Hancock Park, Vernon, Boyle Heights and Lincoln Heights.

=== Growth under Huntington ===
The LARy continued to expand throughout the early 1900s purchasing its erstwhile competitor the Los Angeles Traction Company in 1903. In 1910 "The Great Merger" saw Huntington separate himself from Pacific Electric's operations. City operations went to LARy and Pacific Electric took over the interurban routes. This took LARy to its historical maximum size, operating on nearly 173 miles of double track. After the merger, Henry Huntington retired and passed control to his son, Howard E. Huntington. Center-entrance, low-floor cars were introduced in 1912 and were joined by a fleet of 75 new cars from the St. Louis Car Company in anticipation of increased traffic from the Panama-Pacific Exposition. In May 1912, the company operated a total of 836 cars.

=== The jitney craze ===
From 1898 to 1913, the railway was a money-making success, but, beginning in 1914, streetcar systems across the United States began experiencing difficulties, including fewer riders, inflation brought on by World War I, and increased labor and operating expenses. In addition, automobile use increased, and in July, 1914, competition from jitneys, motorists who picked up prospective passengers along streetcar routes, impacted the electric railways tremendously. Jitneys faced neither taxes nor street assessments. By November, 1914, there were over 800 operating in the Los Angeles area. Huntington Attorney William Dunn said the railway was losing $600 per day or $219,000 per year. By October construction on the Vermont Avenue crosstown line was postponed because the company couldn’t sell the bonds to pay for it.

By 1915 the situation had gotten worse. Early in that year the state legislature held hearings and estimated statewide that the jitneys pulled in over $7,000,000 in revenue, and that the state lost $200,000 in tax revenue. In addition, the new competition forced the new LA-to-Santa Monica Pacific Motor Coach Company out of business. Dunn said that at time LARy was losing $8400 a day, had laid off 100 motormen and conductors, and stopped the construction of 250 center-entrance cars. No extensions were built through all of 1915 and 1916.

In 1916, LARy estimated that the losses due to jitney competition during 1915 totaled $500,000. Meanwhile, auto ownership in Los Angeles grew from 17,000 registrations in 1914, to 47,000 by 1917. LARy operating revenue fell from $7 million in 1913 to $5.9 million in 1916. The number of passengers dropped from 140 million in 1914, to 117 million in 1917.

In March, 1915, the city council passed an ordinance regulating jitneys which lessened their numbers but didn’t eliminate them altogether. In May, 1917, employees joined management in seeking more regulation. Employees and their wives circulated a petition to enact more stringent regulations. The new ordinance passed in a June 1917 election. Effective on July 1, it banned Jitneys from the business district, required Jitneys to maintain fixed routes, and carry a $10,000 liability bond. Though this drastically reduced the number of Jitneys, in the summer of 1918 the Board of Public Utilities invalidated the licenses of all remaining jitneys, ending the jitney craze.

After the jitneys were eliminated, ridership increased during 1918 to 123 million passengers and operating revenue increased to $6.6 mm in 1918.

Shortages First World War further restricted expansion efforts and brought about the introduction of skip-stop service throughout the system. Even without competition from the jitneys, LARy was forced to cut lines and switch to smaller, more efficient Birney streetcars to maintain profitability.

=== The Twenties and new changes ===
Although the prosperity of the Roaring Twenties brought some relief and a return to the previous quality of service, a proposal to establish a rival bus company by William Gibbs McAdoo greatly concerned the existing streetcar companies of Los Angeles. LARy and Pacific Electric succeeded in defeating McAdoo's scheme through a public referendum by proposing their own system, the Los Angeles Motor Bus Company. The first service began in August 1923, and by 1925 had 53 miles of bus routes, the second-most in the nation after Chicago.

In 1920, the railroad began to publish an in-house weekly periodical known as Two Bells. In September of 1928, its format changed to a monthly periodical.

=== The Thirties and hard times ===
The Great Depression hit the railway hard, and revenue shortfalls forced the modification of the Type-H cars to allow operation by a single driver and the closure of the Division 2 car house. The passage of the National Industrial Recovery Act encouraged union growth and spurred a 1934 strike for higher wages by members of the Amalgamated Transit Union. 1/8th of employees joined the strike and were subsequently fired, damaging equipment in the aftermath. Amid these difficulties the PCC streamline car was introduced in 1937.

=== The Forties and World War II ===
Continued rail operating expenses and the introduction of GM 45-seat buses led to the abandonment of the L, K and 2 lines by 1941. Further cutbacks in rail service were approved by the Board of Public Utilities and would have replaced all but the busiest lines with bus service. World War II intervened, and tire and gas shortages increased demand for rail service. Old cars were taken out of storage and women began to work in various capacities to meet demand while minimizing resource use.

=== Purchase by American City Lines (1944) ===
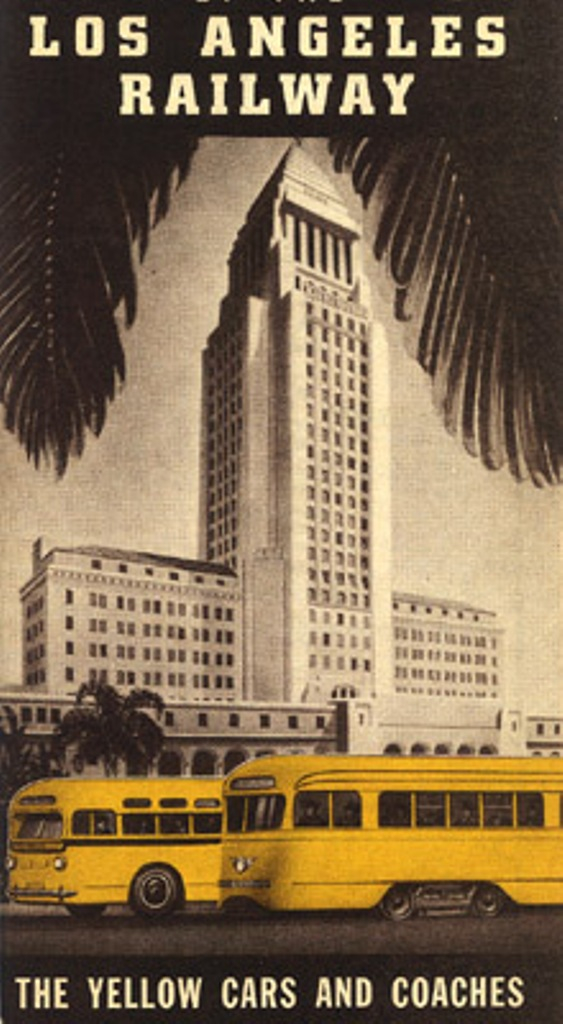
Los Angeles Railway route map (cover), 1942

The system was sold in 1944 by Huntington's estate to American City Lines, Inc., of Chicago, a subsidiary of National City Lines, a holding company that was purchasing transit systems across the country. The sale was announced December 5, 1944, but the purchase price was not disclosed. National City Lines, along with its investors that included Firestone Tire, Standard Oil of California (now Chevron Corporation) and General Motors, were later convicted of conspiring to monopolize the sale of buses and related products to local transit companies controlled by National City Lines and other companies (Note: United States Court of Appeals for the Seventh Circuit (1951), para 33) in what became known as the General Motors streetcar conspiracy. National City Lines purchased Key System, which operated the streetcar system in Oakland, California, the following year.

The company was renamed as Los Angeles Transit Lines. The new company introduced 40 new ACF-Brill trolley buses which had originally been intended for the Key System, which was being converted to buses by National City Lines in late 1948.

Many streetcar lines were converted to buses in the late 1940s and early 1950s.

=== Public ownership and finale ===
The last remaining lines were taken over by the Los Angeles Metropolitan Transit Authority (a predecessor to the current agency, The Los Angeles County Metropolitan Transportation Authority (Metro)) along with the remains of the Pacific Electric Railway in 1958. The agency removed the remaining five streetcar lines (J, P, R, S and V) and two trolley bus lines (2 and 3), replacing electric service with diesel buses after March 31, 1963.

== List of routes ==
Map of the post-1921 numbered routes

- A Line – Mid City to Echo Park; by way of Adams Boulevard, Kensington Street, Venice Boulevard, Broadway, Temple Street, Edgeware Road, and Douglas Street.
- B Line – Nevin to City Terrace; by way of Ascot Avenue, Hooper Avenue, 12th Street, Main Street, Brooklyn Avenue, Evergreen Avenue, Wabash Avenue, and City Terrace Drive.
- D Line – Westlake to Skid Row; by way of Bonnie Brae Street, 3rd Street, Alvarado Street, 6th Street, and 5th Street.
- F Line – Athens to Boyle Heights; by way of Vermont Avenue, Hoover Street, Santa Barbara Avenue, Grand Avenue, Jefferson Boulevard, Main Street, 3rd Street, 4th Place, 4th Street, and Fresno Street.
- G Line – Nevin to South Park; by way of McKinley Avenue, Jefferson Boulevard, Griffith Avenue, Washington Boulevard, and Main Street.
- H Line – South Los Angeles to East Hollywood; by way of San Pedro Street, 7th Street, Broadway, 6th Street, Rampart Boulevard, Beverly Boulevard, Heliotrope Drive, and Melrose Avenue.
- I Line - W 1st St
- J Line – Jefferson Park to Huntington Park; by way of Jefferson Boulevard, Central Avenue, Vernon Avenue, and Pacific Boulevard.
- K Line - Nevin to South Park; by way of Naomi Avenue and Olympic Boulevard.
- L Line – East Hollywood to Mid-City; by way of Lexington Avenue, Madison Avenue, Temple Street, Broadway, and Olympic Boulevard.
- N Line – Koreatown to South Park; by way of 8th Street and 9th Street.
- O Line – South Los Angeles to Lincoln Heights; by way of Main Street.
- P Line – Mid-City to City Terrace; by way of Pico Boulevard, Main Street, 1st Street, Gage Avenue, Hammel Street, and Record Avenue.
- R Line – Hancock Park to East Los Angeles; by way of 3rd Street, Vermont Avenue, 7th Street, Boyle Avenue, and Whittier Boulevard.
- S Line – Watts to East Hollywood; by way of Central Avenue, Florence Avenue, Avalon Boulevard, Vernon Avenue, Vermont Street, 3rd Street, and Western Avenue.
- U Line – Nevin to West Adams; by way of Central Avenue, Jefferson Boulevard, Vermont Street, and 27th Street.
- V Line – Nevin to East Hollywood; by way of Santa Fe Avenue, 7th Street, and Vermont Street.
- W Line – Mid-City to Highland Park; by way of Washington Boulevard, Figueroa Street, 6th Street, Broadway, Avenue 20, Figueroa Street, and York Boulevard.
- 2 Line – Rampart area of Echo Park to Montecito Heights; by way of Belmont Avenue, Loma Drive, 3rd Street, Flower Street, 5th Street, Broadway, Pasadena Avenue, Avenue 26, and Griffin Avenue.
- 3 Line – Skid Row to Hollywood; by way of 5th Street, 6th Street, private ROW, 3rd Street, and Larchmont Boulevard.
- 5 Line – Hawthorne to Eagle Rock; by way of Hawthorne Boulevard, Market Street (Inglewood), private ROW paralleling Redondo Boulevard (later Florence Avenue), Crenshaw Boulevard, Leimert Boulevard (dedicated tracks in center divider), Santa Barbara Avenue, Grand Avenue, Jefferson Boulevard, Main Street, Broadway, Pasadena Avenue, Avenue 20, Figueroa Street, Cypress Avenue, Eagle Rock Boulevard, and Colorado Boulevard.
- 7 Line – South Los Angeles to Los Angeles Plaza Historic District; by way of Broadway, Main Street, and Spring Street.
- 8 Line – Leimert Park to Los Angeles Plaza Historic District; by way of 54th Street, Broadway, Main Street, and Spring Street.
- 9 Line – Leimert Park to the Wholesale District, by way of 48th Street, Hoover Street, Grand Avenue, Pico Boulevard, Broadway, and 2nd Street.
- 10 Line – Leimert Park to Lincoln Heights; by way of Vernon Avenue, Dalton Avenue, Martin Luther King Jr. Boulevard, Grand, Pico Boulevard, Broadway, and Lincoln Park Avenue.

== Rolling stock ==
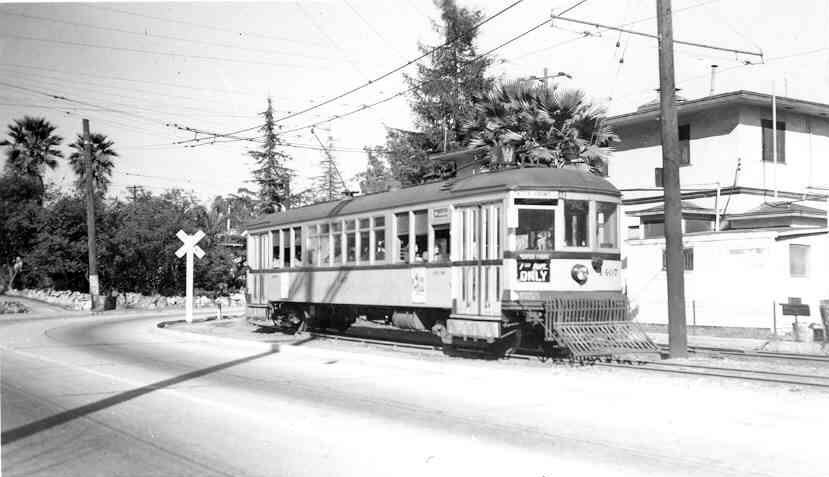
Unit #1407, one of 250 streetcars built for the LARy by the St. Louis Car Company, turns up Marmion Way. The air-operated folding doors were added in the 1930s to permit one-man operation.

Historian Jim Walker notes that there were three major classifications of LARy cars: the Huntington Standards, the all-steel cars, and the streamliners. All were built to run on narrow-gauge tracks spaced 3’ 6” apart. The type numbers referred to below were created by LARy in 1920 to categorize their cars; there were many sub-categories (e.g., B-2, H-3, K-4, etc.) not recorded here.

=== The Standards ===
The Huntington Standard (Type B) was numerically LARy’s largest, with an eventual count of 747 cars. Designed in 1901-1902 by LARy engineers and originally 38’ long, these wooden “California Cars” had open sections on both ends and an enclosed center section, but their most distinctive feature was the five-window front, with two elegant curved corner windows. These cars seemed to dominate the Southern California landscape in the eyes of the world, to a large extent because they were featured in many early movies. The Standards were either rebuilt from older cars or were purchased from manufacturers between 1902 and 1912.

Pay-As-You-Enter (PAYE) Standard - Beginning in 1910, Standards were lengthened to 44 feet and modified into a PAYE format. Each end of the original cars were lengthened and an additional entrance door was added so the conductor could collect fares without having to roam through the car.

Center-entrance Cars (Type C), also called “sowbellies”, were modified older Standards with a low-step center entrance and exit to accommodate the “hobble skirt” craze of the early teens. Beginning in 1913, 107 older Standards were converted and 76 new cars were purchased from the St. Louis Car Company, but the conversions were stopped in 1914 because of a Jitney-caused drop in patronage and the eventual end of the hobble-skirt fashion. One significant drawback to this design was that they could not be converted to one-man operation.

Over the years, less major variations in Type B car designs included different lengths, different seat arrangements, various center section window formats, mesh safety gates vs panels, modifications for cars that made longer runs, and modifications for one-man or two-man operation.

Older Type B cars began to be scrapped beginning in the 1930s, and the last of these iconic cars operated through 1952.

=== The All-Steel Cars ===
All-Steel Cars (Type H) were configured very similar to the Type B cars with open ends and a closed center section. After the disastrous Pacific Electric wreck at Vineyard in July, 1913, the drawbacks of high-speed wooden cars led companies to turn to steel construction. From November, 1921 through early 1924, LARy received 250 of these cars from the St. Louis Car Company. The cars were capable of running in multiple-unit trains for use on heavier lines and were assigned to the Grand Avenue-Moneta line and the S line. The use of multiple-unit operation was stopped in 1930, when reduced patronage due to the depression made the use of trains unnecessary. These cars were updated to accommodate one-operator, two-operator operation between 1934 and 1936. In 1955, due to the abandonment of many rail lines, many of the units were sold to National Metals for scrapping. In 1956, 41 Type H-4 cars were sent to Seoul and Pusan, South Korea as part of an aid program.

LARy also built 50 wood copies (designated Type K) of these steel cars in their own shops between 1923 and 1925. These were initially used on the E (later 5) line; during 1930, they were transferred to the W line. As with other cars, in between 1936 and 1938, many cars were updated to accommodate one-operator, two-operator operation. Almost all of these two car types were scrapped after the abandonment of rail lines in 1955.

=== The Streamliners ===
LARy introduced the Streamliners (Type P) in 1937. The streamlined Presidential Conference Car, or PCC, developed by the industry as a hoped-for savior, were the very latest in transit engineering: modern, comfortable, sleek, and smooth-running . The city celebrated the arrival of these modern cars by creating Transportation Week, where the first car was unveiled by young actress Shirley Temple. LARy only received 65 from the St. Louis Car Company, and successor Los Angeles Transit Lines (LATL) ordered 60 more which were placed in service in 1948 on the most popular lines. The PCC cars were used until final abandonment in 1963.

=== Other passenger cars ===
In addition to these three major categories, LARy had a variety of other cars.

Shorties or Maggies (Type A) - When the Huntington/Hellman syndicate acquired LARy, the line had a large variety of existing wooden cars. The group of short (35’ 5”), wooden cars, which were later designated ‘’’Type A’’’, were either Pullman cars purchased in 1896 or assorted city cars received from Pacific Electric, in 1910. Most of these cars ran on lighter-used lines due to their smaller capacity. Because many had magnetic brakes they were dubbed “Maggies”. Of the eventual 74 short cars, many were converted to other configurations between 1910 and 1923. Twenty-eight were lengthened and converted to Type B Huntington Standards and twenty-two were converted to Type C center-entrance cars. After sixteen more were converted to arch-roof cars by 1923, there were only eight of the short versions remaining, which were retired in 1939, after the I line was abandoned.

Arch-Roof cars (Type F) - In 1922 fifteen of the short cars were converted into Pay-as-you-enter cars with walkover seats throughout and a distinctive arched roof. Initially used on the 5 line as two-man cars, after World War II, LATL rebuilt them for one-man operation in 1948 and they were used until 1954.

Birney Safety Cars (Type G) - In 1919, LARy purchased seventy of these lightweight single-truck cars in response to the California Railroad Commission’s 1919 report which recommended 400 of them to bolster the company’s financial situation. These light cars needed only a single operator, consumed less electricity, and produced less wear on the tracks, which did result in reduced costs. First deployed in September, 1920 on lighter lines, their slow, rough ride, hard seats, and lack of open sections made the cars unpopular with riders. All were placed in storage by 1928, but a dozen were used during World War II. After the war, LATL used them on shuttle lines until they were abandoned in 1946.

Funeral Cars (Type D and Type E) - LARy created two unique Funeral cars to serve the areas cemeteries. The first, a smaller car was rebuilt from a passenger car in 1909 and called “Paraiso”, but was converted again to a passenger car in 1911 when a new, larger car, named “Descanso”, was created. The larger Descanso was used until 1922, when it, too, was rebuilt as a passenger car, and the original, smaller car was re-rebuilt and named “Descanso”. The second Descanso was later donated to the Railroad Boosters.

Experimental cars (Type L and Type M) - LARy purchased two special cars for possible future use. Type L was a low-floor, all-steel car delivered in March, 1925, and Type M, two Peterr Witt pay-as-you-pass cars with front entrances and center exits were delivered in March, 1930. The Depression prevented additional purchases, and by the time there was any opportunity to buy new cars, the new PCC car had been developed.

Trolley Coaches - LARy had ordered a Twin Coach demonstrator trolley coach in 1937, to test its feasibility, but at that time didn’t order more. After 1945, LATL transferred 40 ACF Brill trolley coaches from the Oakland Key System to Los Angeles for use on the new Trolley Coach line 3 (converted from parts of rail lines D, U, and 3). Additional Brill coaches were purchased, and were used to convert rail line B to Trolley Coach line 2 in 1948. The two trolley coach lines ran until 1963.

=== Work and miscellaneous cars ===
LARy had almost 150 work and maintenance cars designed to carry out a variety of tasks on the railway. This included pay and money cars, various specialized repair cars, fuel cars, locomotives and lighter-duty power cars, cranes, material haulers and flat cars, rail grinders, tower cars for overhead maintenance, maintenance-of-way cars for heavy construction, and emergency cars (wreckers).

=== Colors ===
The railway was well known for its distinctive yellow streetcars. Initially cars had a two-tone yellow paint scheme with a lighter shade for the roof. Under NCL a three-color "fruit salad" scheme was adopted, with a yellow body, a white roof, and a sea-foam green midsection.

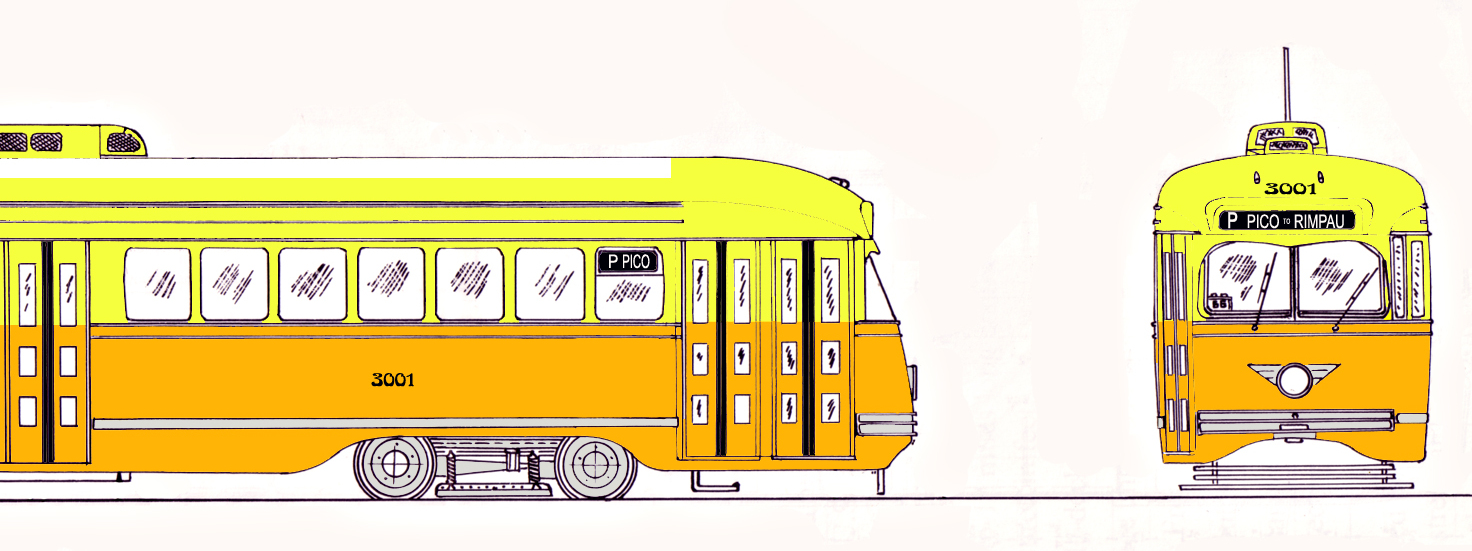
Los Angeles Railway colors

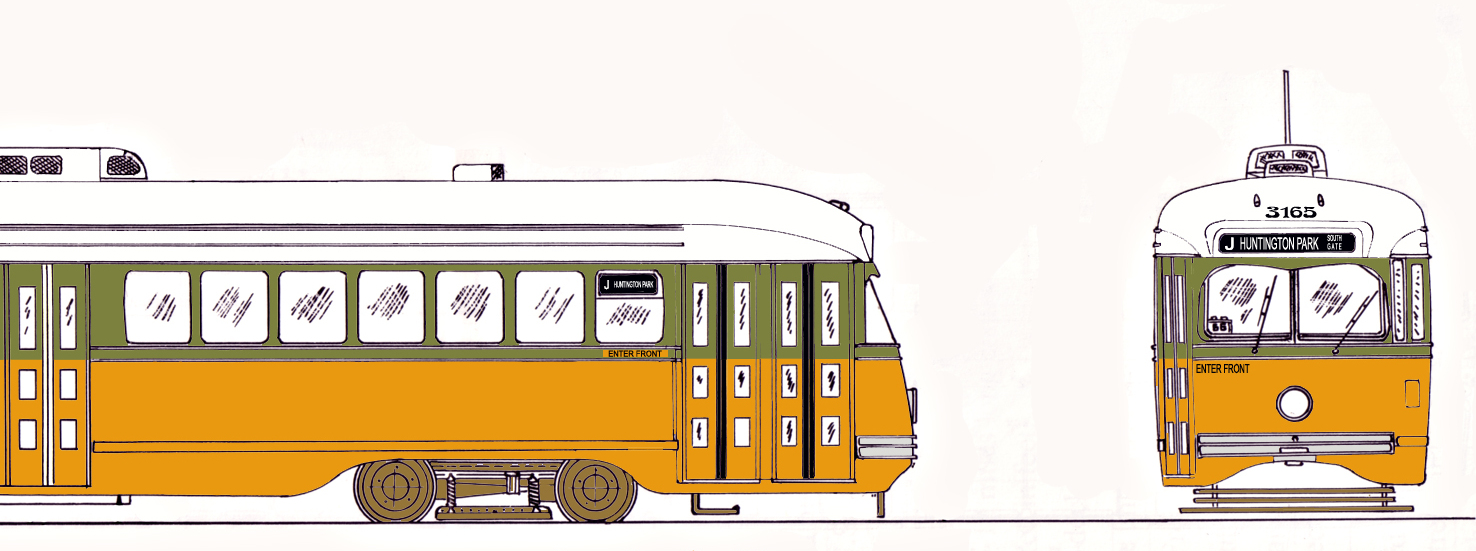
Los Angeles Transit Lines 'fruit salad' colors
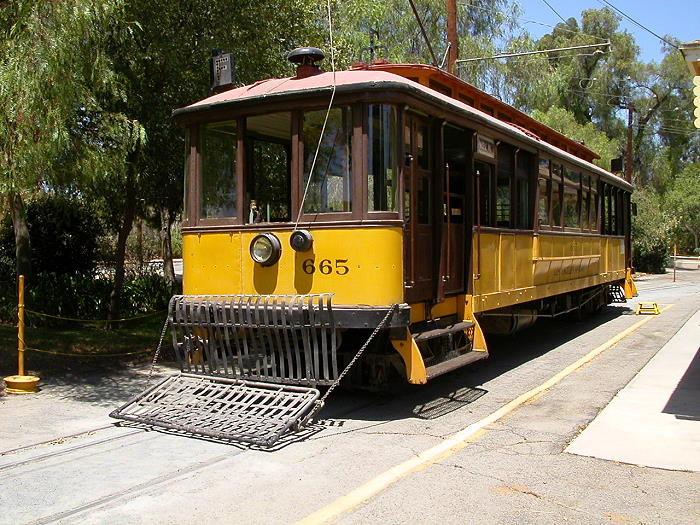
Type B, “Huntington Standard”, car at the Southern California Railway Museum.

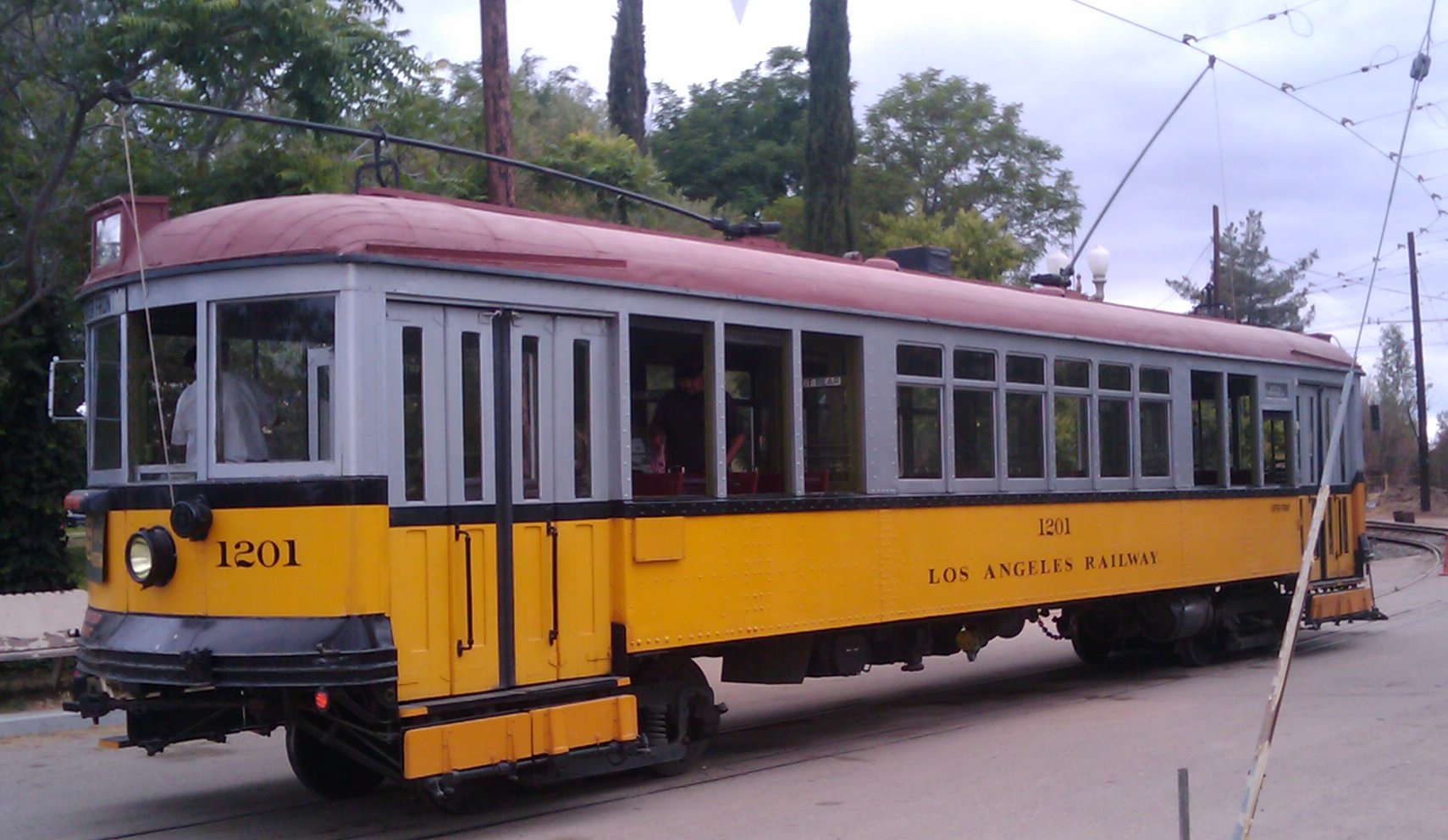
Type H, all-steel car, at the Southern California Railway Museum.

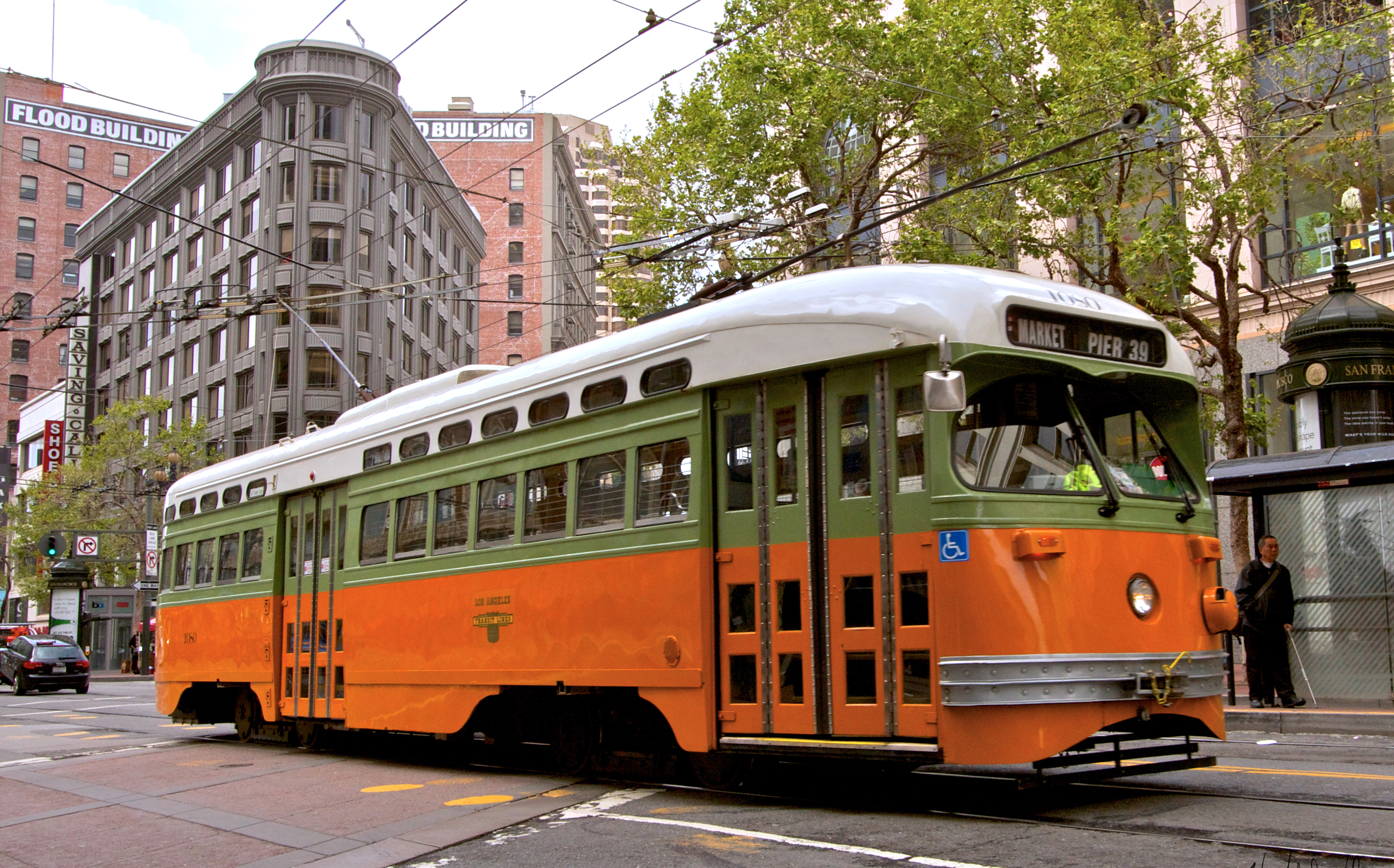
Type P, “Streamliner” (President’s Conference Car), in Los Angeles Transit Lines livery, operating in San Francisco.

== Facilities ==
=== Shops ===
Original shops - When the Huntington syndicate acquired the Los Angeles Railway system in 1898, its headquarters was the former property of the old cable car company at Central Avenue and Wilde Streets, just east of downtown. The facility featured a car house, a power house, and a maintenance and repair shop. A new, larger facility at Central Avenue and 6th Street was completed in August, 1899, and included car houses capable of storing 211 cars, a power house and shops. Huntington planned on increasing the number of routes and cars considerably and began planning larger facilities.

Pacific Electric shops – The new Pacific Electric shops were completed in 1902 at 7th and Central streets. LARy and the Pacific Electric shared them until July, 1903, when the expansion of both systems forced LARy to return to its original 6th and Central property.

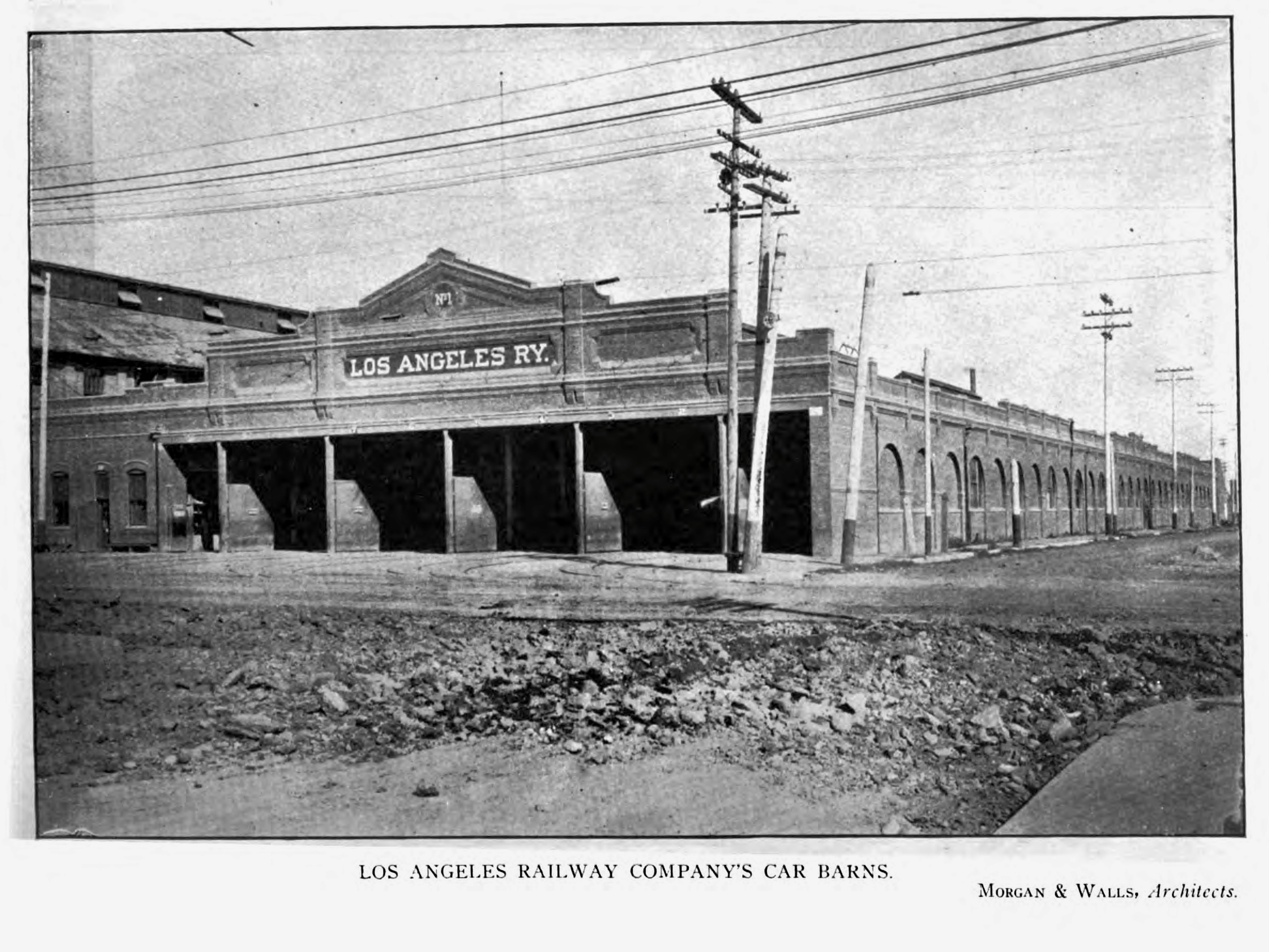
Los Angeles Railway Company Car Barn, photo published 1904

South Park shops – Huntington had acquired a parcel of land south of the city, on the blocks encompassed by 53rd St, 55th St, South Park Ave (now Avalon Boulevard) and San Pedro Street in late 1901 for the planned larger maintenance and repair facilities. Construction of the South Park Shops began In August, 1903. The initial effort, estimated to cost $300,000, focused on the northernmost block. A large car house was completed in 1904. The shop facility was completed in 1906 and included a machine shop, electrical shop, carpentry shop, a blacksmith, electrical and motor repair shops, wheel and truck repair facilities, a parts store room, and painting facilities. From 1910 through 1926, new shops were built on the southern half of the property, including a large paint shop, a new mill, a fender shop and a large storage facility. In 1946, the old shops were closed by new owners, Los Angeles Transit Lines, who used the southern half of the property for maintenance and repairs. The shop was used into the 1990s for bus maintenance and repair.

Vernon Street Yard - In addition to shops for car maintenance and repair, LARy also had a 44-acre facility for maintenance-of-way operations at the Vernon Street yards, located off of Pacific Boulevard in Vernon. The facility opened in 1910 when the line to Huntington Park was completed and included everything needed for the track department and its activities. Facilities included carpentry, machine and other shops, parts storage, offices, the employee ball park, and cottages for the families of Mexicans employed at the yard. The yard was closed in 1946 by LATL, who opened a new Way and Structures facility in the 2 ½-acre Pepper Street yards in the rear of Division 3.

=== Divisions ===
Car houses and their related buildings were known by the numbers of their operating divisions, with five separate locations created through 1912. Each division had offices and at least one car house, where the active streetcars were stored when not in use.

Division 1 was located at 6th Street and Central Avenue, east of downtown. It originally included a power house, car house, headquarters, and shops, and was the first sizeable operating base for streetcars in the city. A new, larger car house was completed in November, 1899. Over 200 cars could be stored in the car houses at this facility. Streetcars ran from here until 1949. Trolley coaches were stored, maintained and painted here from 1947 to 1963. There is still a bus garage at the location, at MTA Division 1.

Division 2 car house opened in February, 1904, at the 54th and San Pedro Street property capable of storing 200 cars. Division 2 closed in 1932, due to decreasing rail patronage and the presence of other, more convenient, car houses throughout the city.

Division 3, at 28th and Idell streets, northeast of the city, opened in February, 1907, and as of 1923 held 231 cars. LATL converted one of the car barns to bus maintenance in 1945. Used for bus storage today.

LARy’s Division 4 was originally the headquarters of the Los Angeles Traction (LAT) Company. When the great merger was completed in late 1910, LARy acquired a number of new lines and cars and the 1896 LAT car house and other facilities between Georgia Street and 12th Street. After the car house was removed in 1925, the area was open storage, encompassing almost a whole city block. After LAMTA purchased the system, it renamed the facility Division 20. The only division that operated streetcars after 1955 (it was closed in 1963), it never housed buses; the Los Angeles Convention Center was built there as part of an urban renewal project.

In January 1913, another large car house, Division 5, opened, this time southwest of downtown at 54th and Arlington. Though capable of holding 300 cars, as of 1923, it held 169 cars. By 1955, the property was entirely bus. Today the location is a bus garage, MTA’s Division 5.

In addition to the divisions, LARy had two bus garages.

The 16th Street Garage, at 16th Street, east of San Pedro Street, also called the Coach Division, was originally used to house LARy’s tower trucks and trouble wagons, but was converted later to a motor vehicle garage, and was expanded in 1925 to house LARY’s own motor coaches. In 1927 a repair shop was added to the property. Today this operates as MTA’s Division 2.

In addition to the 16th Street Garage, the Los Angeles Motor Bus Company (Later Motor Transit Company), which was 50% owned by LARy, had a garage at Virgil and Santa Monica Boulevard.

=== Administrative and operational departments ===
Once the Huntington Pacific Electric Building was completed in January 1905, at 6th and Main streets, both PE and LARy moved their offices there. But once the Great Merger was complete in late 1910, the PE Railway saw the need to use the entire building, and LARy began planning for their own office building.

In May, 1921, the ten-story Los Angeles Railway building was completed at 11th Street and Broadway, and all offices were moved here, occupying mainly the sixth through tenth floors, with the remaining floors devoted to tenants.

In 1946, LATL moved many operations functions to the divisions, and much of the LARy building was leased to other tenants. It later housed the administrative offices for the Los Angeles Metropolitan Transit Authority, and until 1976, it was the headquarters for the Southern California Rapid Transit District.

== Electricity ==
Huntington and Hellman had ambitious plans to expand the Los Angeles Railway, and to plan and construct an interurban electric railway, incorporated in November 1901 as the Pacific Electric Railway. In order to do this, new sources of electricity would be needed to power the new lines.

Early streetcar power systems generated 500- to 600-volt direct current (DC) which was transmitted to the copper overhead wires via feeder cables. But direct current had a limit of how far it could be transmitted at full power, resulting in line loss which led streetcars to run slower the farther they got from the power house (such as episodes reported by the Los Angeles Times in August 1902). Larger systems generated or purchased high-voltage alternating current (AC), which could be transmitted over longer distances to a substation, which used a transformer to drop the current to a voltage that motor-generator sets could use to generate the 600 volts DC required by the streetcars.

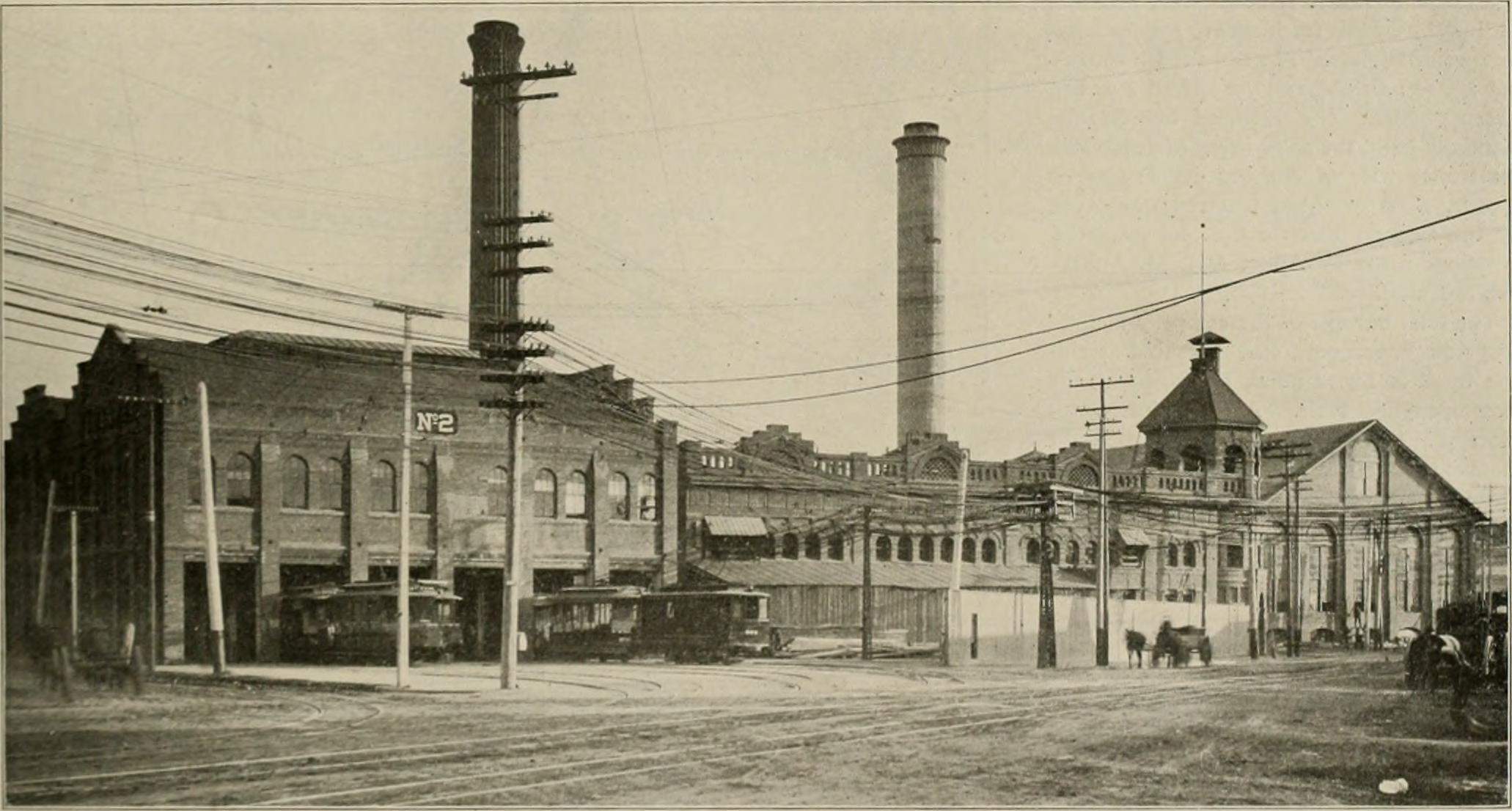
The north end of the 6th and Central Facility showing the stacks to the two steam plants

Sherman and Clark’s original 1891 plant at the company’s Central Avenue and Wilde Street facility generated direct current by utilizing five pairs of two oil-fired Sterling boilers to power a variety of steam engines, which in turn drove several 550-volt generators which generated 5,000 horsepower (hp). In August, 1902, a second power plant was built as part of the expansion of the Central Avenue facility, which then encompassed a large property at Sixth and Central (later called Division One). This new steam power station adjoined the 1891 power station, and was also capable of generating 5000 hp.

In mid-1898, The Los Angeles Railway power station was connected to power generated from a hydroelectric plant that had been created by William G. Kerckhoff and Allan C. Balch’s San Gabriel Electric Company. Located near Azusa at the mouth of the San Gabriel Canyon, the Azusa plant transmitted 15,000 kW AC power 23 miles via power lines to their downtown Los Angeles substation. From there, the power was converted to 500 volts DC and was sent to the LARy power house, and ultimately to the streetcars.

On March 6, 1902, Huntington’s group and Kerckhoff and his investors formed the Pacific Power and Light Company (PL&P), first, to supply power for the expanding electric railways, and second, to sell excess to parts of Los Angeles County. The Huntington group owned 51% of the stock, held in the name of the Los Angeles Railway. Capitalized at ten million dollars, the new company absorbed the San Gabriel Electric Company, the Sierra Power Company, and the Kern River Company, the latter which had been working on a hydroelectric power plant 11 miles south of Kernville.

LARy then began constructing substations which would convert the higher-voltage AC power to the 600 volts required by the motors used on the cars.

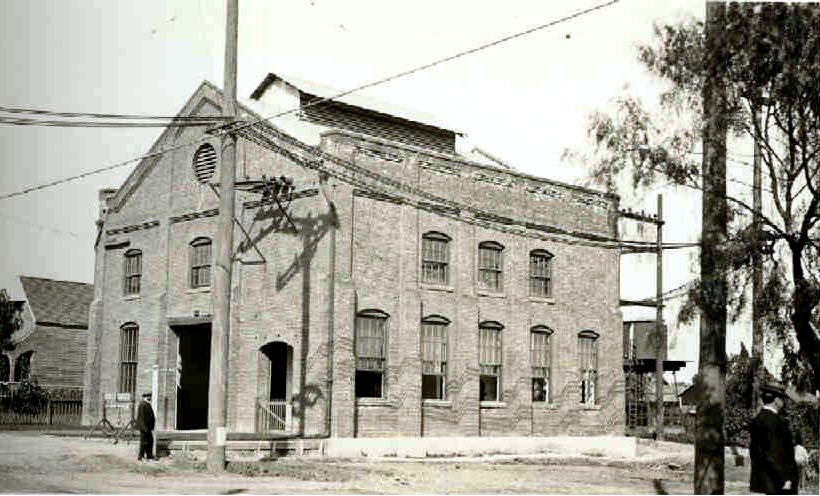
A standard LARy Substation - this is the Soto substation in 1913

The first substation was built near Agricultural Park. Two more were quickly constructed and opened in June, 1903, one near Westlake Park and the other at the Los Angeles Plaza. Each substation was fed by 15,000-volt transmission lines, which were connected to transformers that transformed the power to 2,200-volts. The resulting power was fed to motor-generator sets which produced the 500-volts direct current, which was fed to the overhead via feeder lines. At its peak, LARy had 16 substations which distributed electricity to all their lines.

Electricity from PL&P’s completed Kern River Company’s hydroelectric project reached Los Angeles in December, 1905. With a generating capacity of 17,500 kW, its output was transmitted over 123 miles to a receiving station in Los Angeles, which then distributed the power to its primary customers, the electric railways.

Earlier that same year, Huntington acquired the Redondo Land and Improvement Company and the Los Angeles and Redondo Railway, an electric railway that operated from Los Angeles, through Rosecrans and Gardena, to Redondo Beach with an eye toward developing the town as a resort and a port for lumber deliveries. PL&P began construction on a steam plant nearby in December, 1906, which opened in March, 1908, generating 25,000 kW for the LARy, the Pacific Electric, the Los Angeles and Redondo Railway and other railways and areas.

After the 1910 agreement between Huntington and the SP, in which Huntington’s interests in the Pacific Electric were turned over to the Southern Pacific, and SP’s interest in the LARy was acquired by Huntington, Huntington had a much larger LARy. gained the Pacific Electric’s former city routes, the former LA Traction Company’s lines, and LA and Redondo Railway’s the lines north of 116th Street, totaling 122 additional miles of track. The system now had 345 miles of track. These changes, along with the prospect of supplying power to the larger PE Railway underscored the need to create even more power. The cost of electricity generated at the efficient Redondo steam plant was 4 cents per kilowatt-hour, whereas power generated by hydro power cost less than one-tenth of one cent per kilowatt-hour. In order to build these new projects, Huntington organized a new Pacific Light and Power Company, capitalized at 40 million dollars, in early 1910. This new company enlarged the Redondo Beach plant in December, 1910, adding two 12,000 kW generators.

The new PL&P began its most ambitious project, a large hydroelectric system on the San Joaquin River called Big Creek.

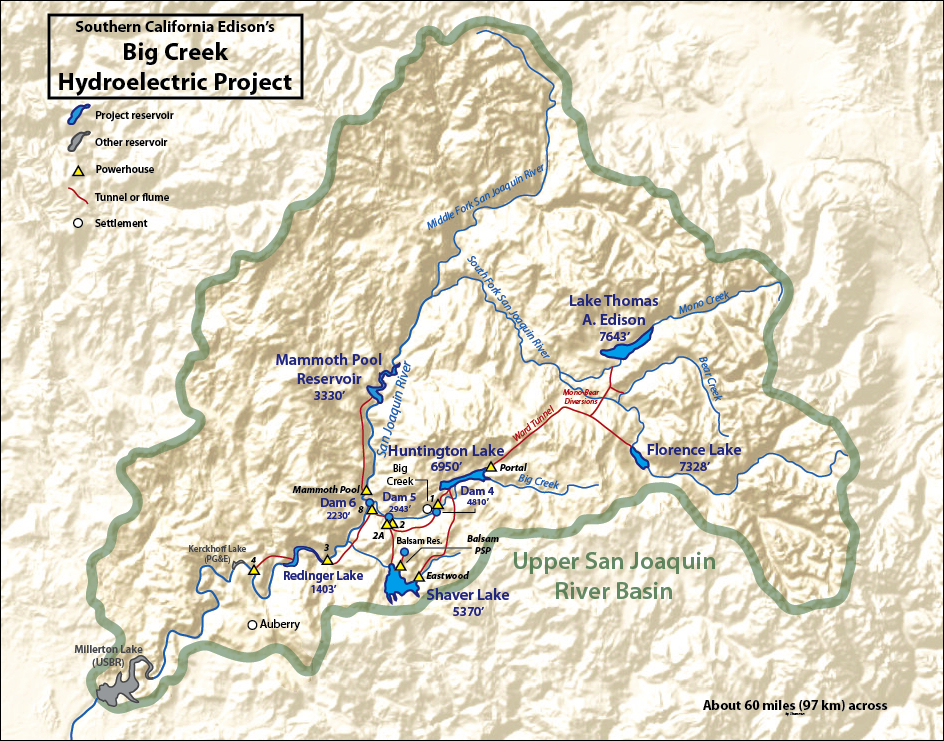
Big Creek hydroelectric project area

In November, 1910, Huntington hired the engineering firm Stone and Webster to oversee what would be the first phase of the Big Creek project. After two years of construction on the South Fork of the San Joaquin River, and the expenditure of 13.9 million dollars, the Borel station of the Big Creek project began generating 60,000 kW of electricity to Los Angeles in December, 1913, which enabled Huntington close the remaining steam plants, though the Redondo plant was kept as a standby.

In 1917, after Huntington had begun to concentrate more on his legacy art and book collections, he sold his interest in PL&P to Southern California Edison, but not without negotiating a contract for the company to continue to furnish power to LARy and the Pacific Electric Railway.

== See also ==
- Bibliography of Los Angeles
- Outline of the history of Los Angeles
- Bibliography of California history
- Angels Flight, funicular railway
- Los Angeles Streetcar, proposed restoration of some streetcar service
- Plaza Substation
- Los Angeles Pacific Railroad
- List of funicular railways
- San Diego Electric Railway
- Southern California Rapid Transit District
- Streetcars in Los Angeles
