= Streetcars in Los Angeles =

Aspect of transportation history

Streetcars in Los Angeles over history have included horse-drawn streetcars and cable cars, and later extensive electric streetcar networks of the Los Angeles Railway and Pacific Electric Railway and their predecessors. Also included are modern light rail lines.

== Horse-drawn streetcars (1874–1897) ==
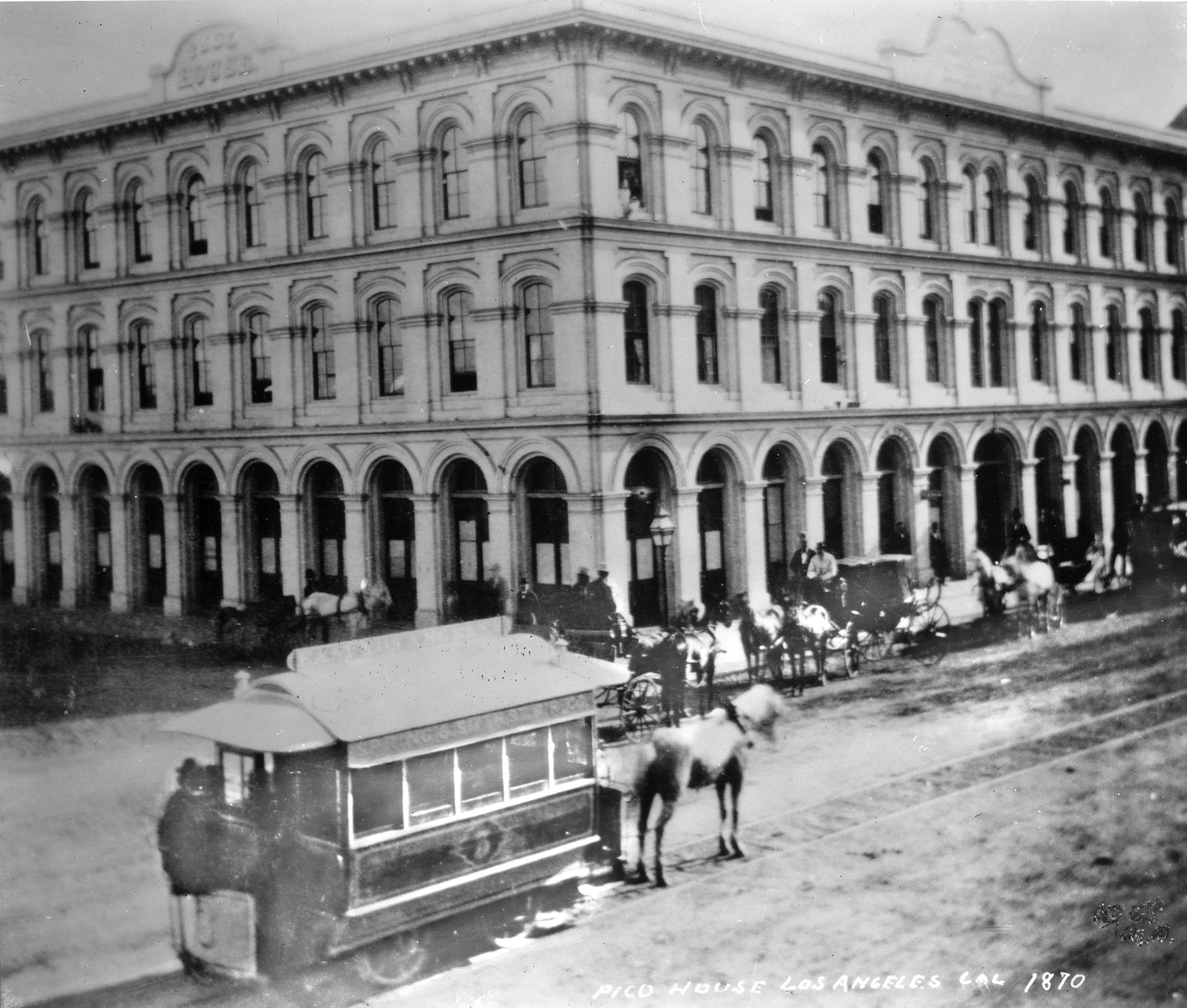
1870: A horse-drawn streetcar of the Spring & Sixth railway in front of the Pico House

Horse-drawn streetcars started with the Spring and Sixth Street Railroad in 1874. Single truck, open air cars traversed unpaved streets. Numerous companies built tracks, with some merging to form larger networks. More railroads of the era included the Main Street and Agricultural Park Railway, the Depot Railway, the City Railroad, and the Central Railroad. The last horsecars were converted to electric in 1897.

== Cable cars (1885–1902) ==
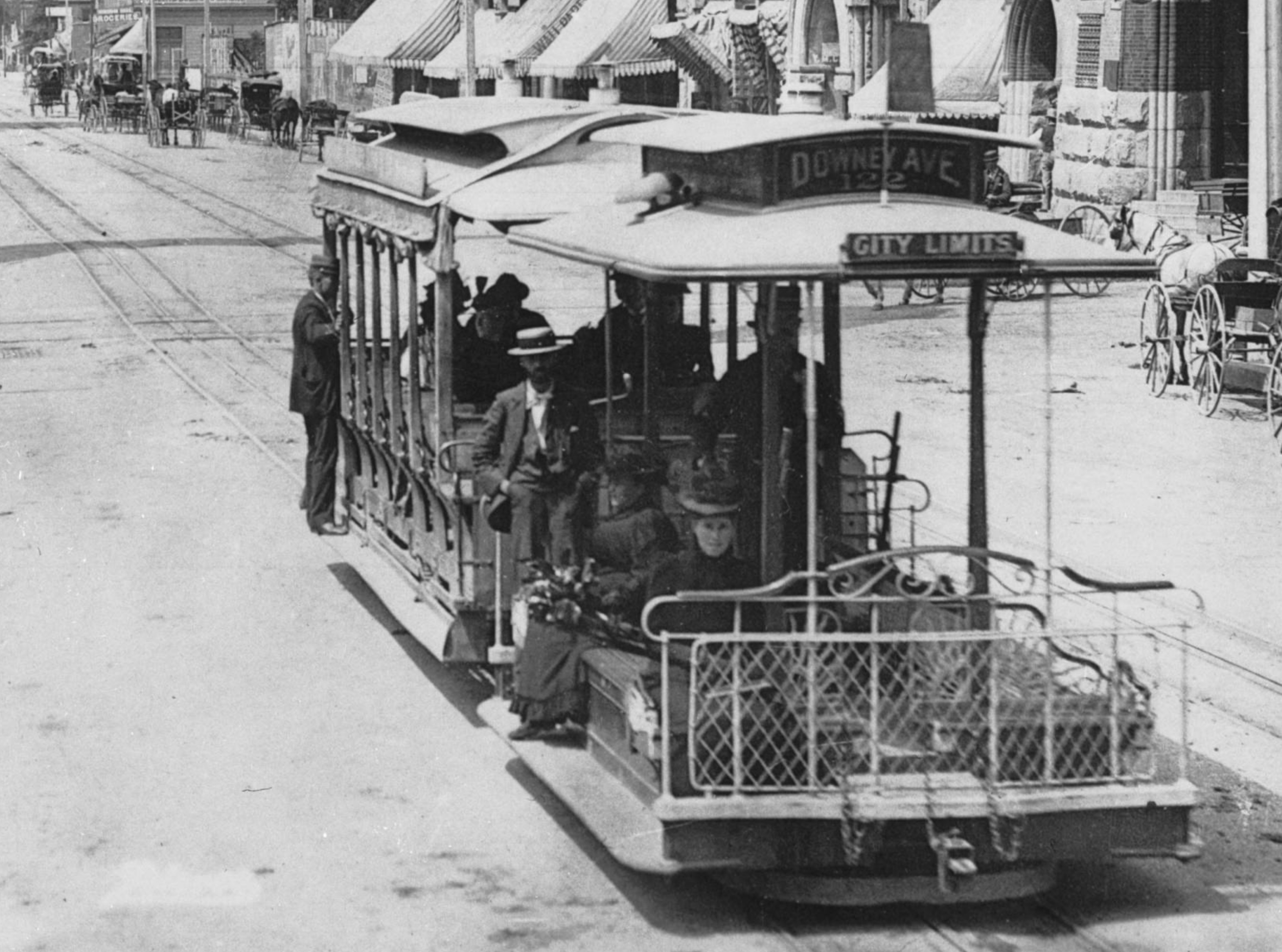
Cable car on Broadway just north of 2nd Street looking south, Los Angeles, c. 1893–1895

Cable car street railways in Los Angeles first began operating up Bunker Hill in 1885, with a total of three companies operating in the period through 1902, when the lines were electrified and electric streetcars were introduced largely following the cable car routes. There were roughly 25 miles (40 km) of routes, connecting 1st and Main in what was then the Los Angeles Central Business District as far as the communities known today as Lincoln Heights, Echo Park/Filipinotown, and the Pico-Union district. A large viaduct over the Southern Pacific yard operated from 1889 to 1896, colloquially known as the Cape Horn Viaduct.

Angel's Flight should not be confused as a cable car because it is a funicular railway operating from Broadway up Bunker Hill.

== Electric streetcar systems (1887–1963) ==
The use of cable traction in Los Angeles was short lived. The Los Angeles Electric Railway began operations in 1887. Electrically-powered streetcar systems were numerous, but were largely consolidated into two large networks.

In 1901, Henry Huntington bought various electric streetcar companies operating mostly within the City of Los Angeles (and not in the San Fernando Valley, Harbor area or Westside) and combined them into the Los Angeles Railway with its "yellow cars". This system operated with narrow gauge tracks and primarily provided local service along its lines. This was the most popular rail operator in Los Angeles based on passenger numbers.

In 1902, Huntington and banker Isaias W. Hellman established the Pacific Electric Railway, which would acquire other railways, providing interurban service to new suburban developments and surrounding towns in what is now Greater Los Angeles (Los Angeles, Orange, San Bernardino County and Riverside Counties). The company operated distinctive "red cars".

The explosion of the highway construction and car ownership before and after World War II reduced the demand for passenger rail services, and many lines were controversially converted to bus service by 1955. After being transferred to municipal ownership under the Los Angeles Metropolitan Transit Authority, all former Pacific Electric and Los Angeles Railway services had ended by 1963. Elements of the film Who Framed Roger Rabbit are loosely based on the closure and dismantling of Los Angeles' electric streetcars.

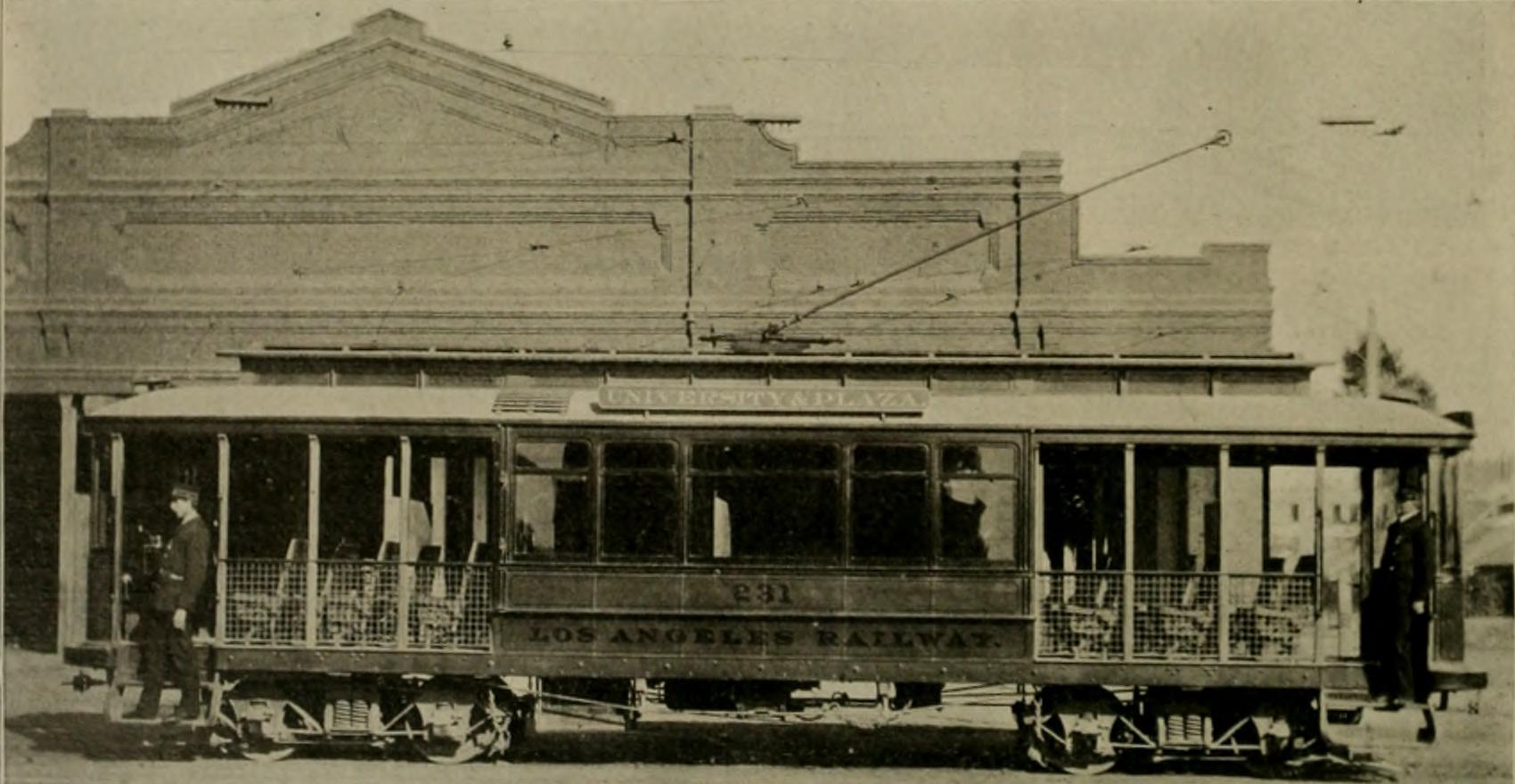
A Los Angeles Railway electric streetcar, 1891

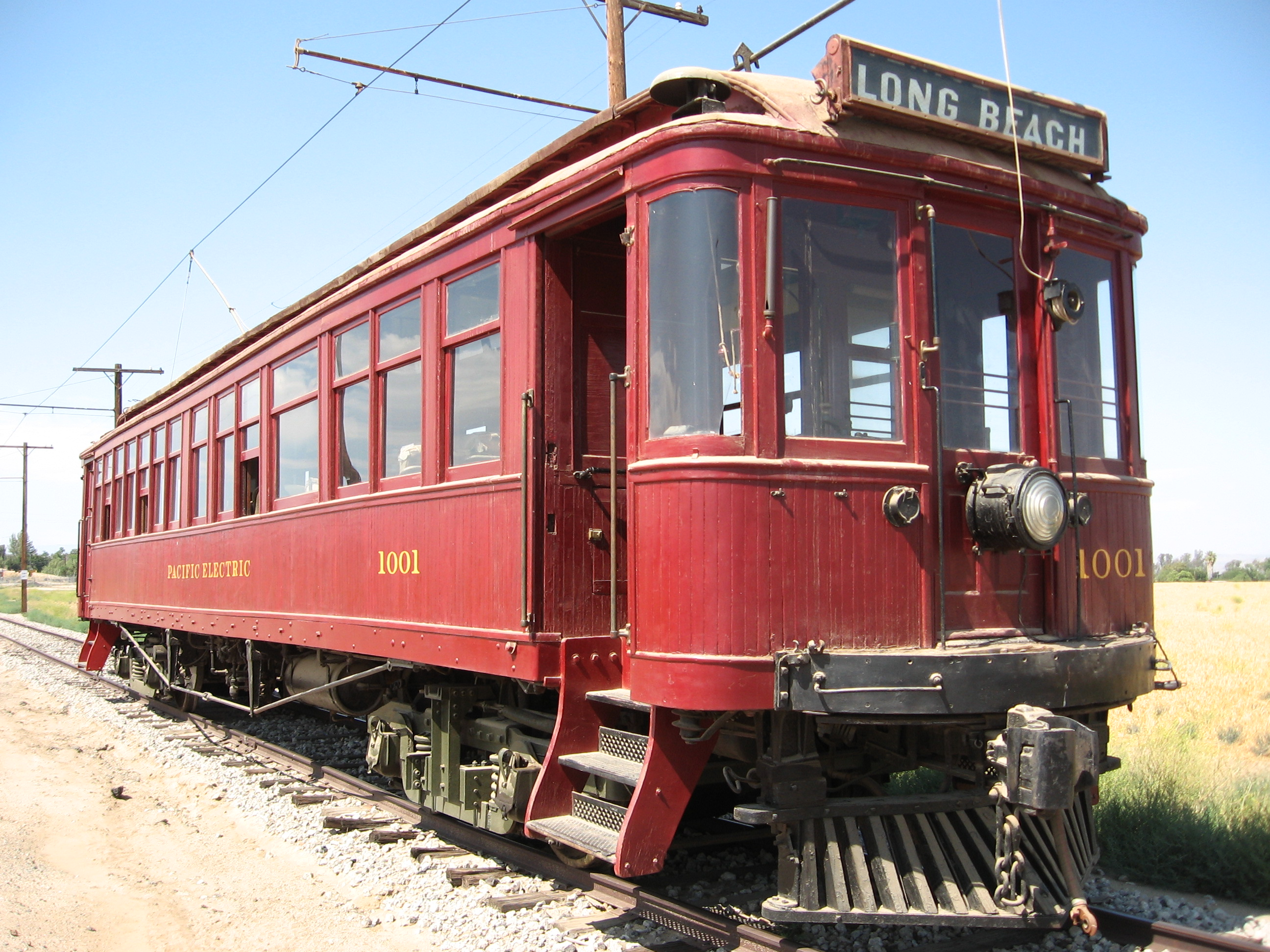
"Red car" of the Pacific Electric

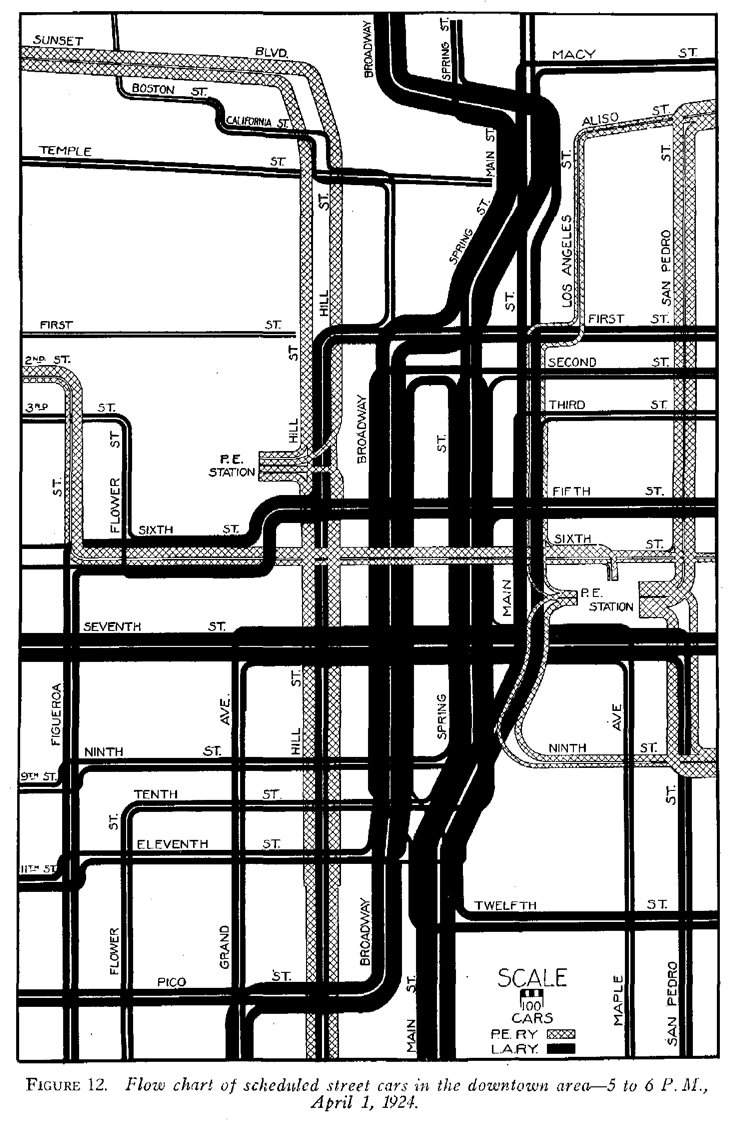
Schematic map of streetcar and interurban lines serving Downtown Los Angeles; April 1, 1924.

== LACMTA Metro light rail (1990–present) ==
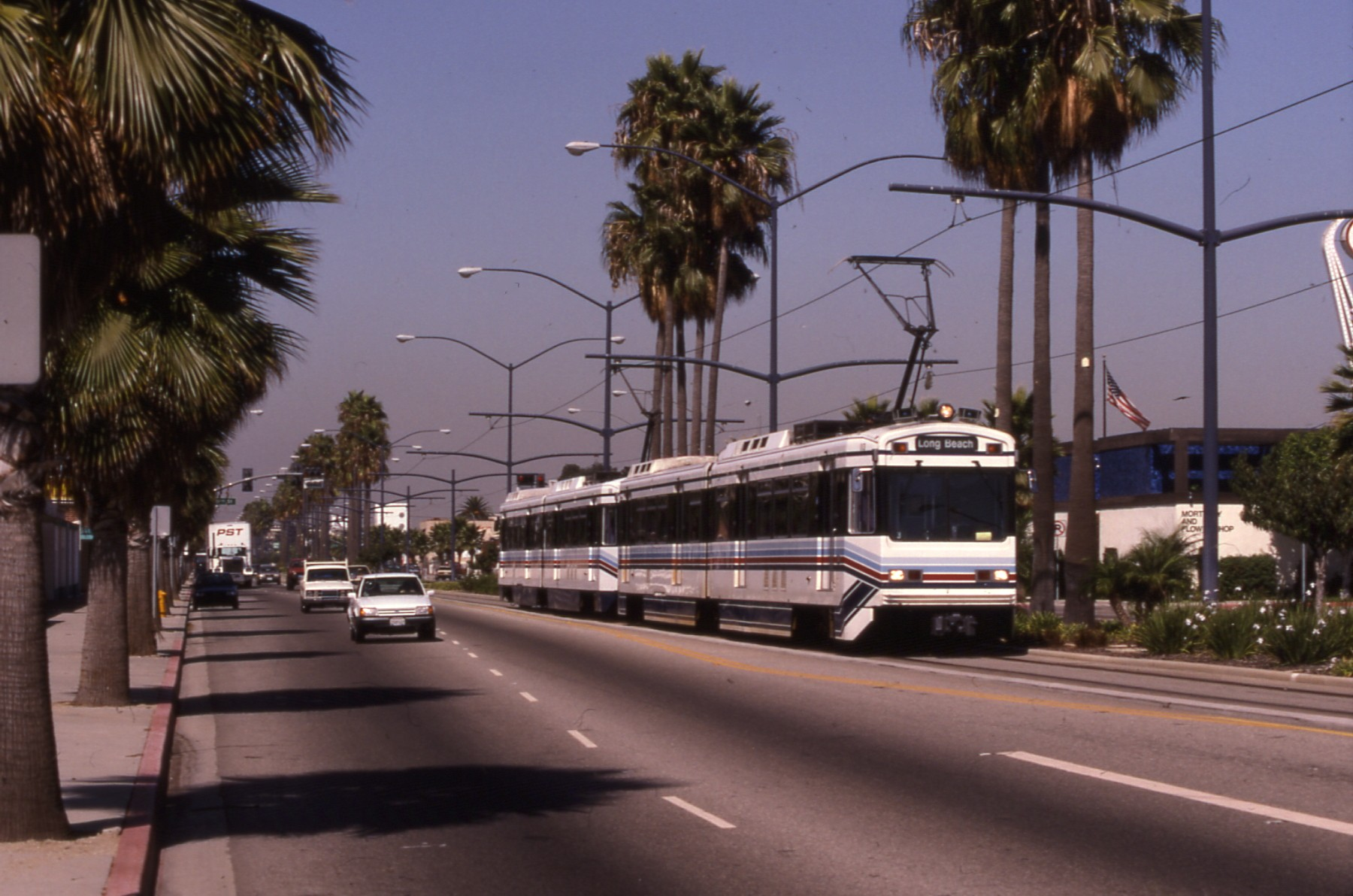
The Blue Line (now A Line) running in the median strip of Long Beach Boulevard in Long Beach

The Los Angeles County Transportation Commission was formed to coordinate transit planning in the county. After the passage of Proposition A in 1980, light rail had emerged as a preferred mode for new services. Partially rebuilt on former Pacific Electric corridors, the new rail lines differ from the last generation of services by operating almost entirely in a dedicated right of way without interference from cars. As of 2021, the system consists of four lines:

- The A Line opened in 1990 as the Blue Line, operating both on city streets in Downtown Los Angeles and Downtown Long Beach, as well as on a dedicated surface and underground rights of way. It is built on a section of the former Pacific Electric Long Beach Line.
- The C Line opened as the Green Line in 1995. It operated mostly in the median of Interstate 105 between Redondo Beach, the LAX area and Norwalk.
- The L Line opened as the Gold Line in 2003 and now operates between Downtown L.A. and Azusa in the northeast and East Los Angeles in the southeast. It is planned to be split up and absorbed into the A an E line in the future.
- The E Line between Downtown L.A. and Santa Monica opened its first section in 2012 as the Expo Line. It operates on a section of the former Santa Monica Air Line.

Additional services are planned in the future:

- The East San Fernando Valley Light Rail Transit Project will reinstate local rail service in the San Fernando Valley, connecting to other Metro services as well as commuter rail and Amtrak services primarily via Van Nuys Boulevard and San Fernando Road.

== OC Streetcar (under construction) ==
The OC Streetcar is a 4.15-mile (6.7 km) modern streetcar line under construction in Orange County. It will connect the Santa Ana Regional Transportation Center to the Harbor Transit Center in Garden Grove, following a former Pacific Electric Railway right-of-way for most of its route. The project broke ground in 2018, with opening now projected for March 2026. Service is planned every 10–15 minutes, with an estimated daily ridership of about 7,000.

== Los Angeles Streetcar (proposed) ==
The Los Angeles Streetcar is a planned local streetcar in Downtown Los Angeles.
