= 2 (Los Angeles Railway) =

Former lines of the Los Angeles Railway

2 was a designation given to several transit lines in Los Angeles, California. The number was assigned to a streetcar route in 1930 which lasted a year, then later reassigned to a new service in 1932. Trolley buses replaced streetcars on a 3rd line in 1948, and the line was converted to full motor coach operation in 1963.

== West 7th Line ==
2

Overview
- Locale: Los Angeles

Service
- Type: Streetcar
- System: Los Angeles Railway

History
- Opened: 1930
- Closed: June 1, 1931

Technical
- Track gauge: 3 ft 6 in (1,067 mm)
- Electrification: Overhead line, 600 V DC

The first incarnation of the 2 was assembled from existing trackage, running from 7th Street and Central to and Vermont Avenue and 1st Street. It ran during peak periods only and lasted from 1930 to June 1931.

== Second version ==
2

Overview
- Locale: Los Angeles

Service
- Type: Streetcar
- System: Los Angeles Railway

History
- Opened: June 13, 1932
- Closed: October 5, 1941

Technical
- Track gauge: 3 ft 6 in (1,067 mm)
- Electrification: Overhead line, 600 V DC

The new 2 line has a more continuous history. It began service on June 12, 1932, as a combination of two former routes: A-2 West Adams and Griffith Avenue Line and C Crown Hill and Temple Street Line. It ran from Montecito and Griffin in the east to Belmont and Temple where connections were available to the L car. Cars began running though the Pacific Electric's Hill Street Tunnel in July 1939 as the line was diverted to Temple Street and Hill Street. That same year, the Griffin Avenue section was converted to bus service and the line was routed to 5th Street, which was already in service under the D, U, and V lines. The line ceased service on October 5, 1941, with the closure of the Crown Hill branch, and was thereupon converted to trolley bus service.

=== Trolley coach and bus operation ===
The service was maintained and transferred to Los Angeles Metropolitan Transit Authority in 1958. The agency replaced trolley buses with SilverLiner coaches after March 31, 1963; the new service retained the number 2.
