= R (Los Angeles Railway) =

Streetcar line in Los Angeles, California, U.S.

Overview
- Owner: Los Angeles Metropolitan Transit Authority
- Locale: Los Angeles, East Los Angeles
- Termini: 3rd Street and La Brea Avenue; Whittier Boulevard and Eastern Avenue
- Stations: 33

Service
- Type: Streetcar
- System: Los Angeles Railway, Los Angeles Metropolitan Transit Authority
- Daily ridership: 21,230 (1940)

History
- Opened: 1895
- Closed: March 31, 1963

Technical
- Track gauge: 3 ft 6 in (1,067 mm)
- Electrification: Overhead line, 600 V DC

R was a streetcar line in Los Angeles, California. It was operated by the Los Angeles Railway and its immediate corporate successor, Los Angeles Transit Lines, from 1895 to 1958, and by the Los Angeles Metropolitan Transit Authority from 1958 to 1963.

== History ==
=== Sixth Street Line (1895–1920) ===
The original routes of what would become the R line ran on a drastically different route. When it was first built in 1895, the route ran from a terminus at West Third Street down a private right-of-way between Wilton Place and Grammercy Place to Sixth Street. From there it continued down Sixth to Alvarado, Seventh Street, Figueroa, Sixth, Olive, and Fifth Street to Arcade Depot (later Central Station). When the competing Los Angeles Interurban Railway was purchased, the Sixth Street Line ran entirely down 6th Street between Wilton and Arcade Station. This was briefly a local route of the Pacific Electric Railway before the Great Merger of 1911.

=== Stephenson Avenue Line (1895–1920) ===
The Stephenson Avenue Line was also one of the original LARy routes. Though its Downtown terminus is unknown, this route ran to the city's eastern limit by way of First Street, Cummings Street, Boyle Avenue, and Stephenson Avenue (present-day Whittier Boulevard).

=== The old R (1920–1931) ===
When the Los Angeles Railway was restructured in 1920, the Sixth Street and Stephenson Avenue lines were merged and streamlined. The western terminus was extended northwest along 3rd Street and Larchmont Boulevard to Melrose Avenue, while the eastern terminus was extended beyond city limits to a loop track between the Calvary and Beth Israel Cemeteries. The addition of new trackage over the Los Angeles River now allowed the route to run entirely on Seventh Street between Alvarado and Boyle, making trips across Downtown significantly shorter and quicker. The route was designated "R" in 1921.

It ran from 3rd and La Brea to Whittier and Eastern East Los Angeles, by way of 3rd Street, Vermont Avenue, 7th Street, Boyle Avenue, and Whittier Boulevard. When the route opened, the original western terminus was at Larchmont Avenue and Melrose Avenue. This alignment was replaced by the new 3 in 1931.

=== The New R (1931–1963) ===
In 1931, the construction of several linking tracks allowed R's western portion to run on an entirely new route, from East Los Angeles to the new Fairfax District by way of Whittier Boulevard, Boyle Avenue, 7th Street, Vermont Avenue, and 3rd Street. The old western portion, which followed the new route closely, was re-christened 3, and terminated at Central Station. The new route was amongst the most used routes throughout its run.

In 1950, a branch line was run on Western Avenue between 3rd street and Santa Monica Boulevard. Previously this route had been serviced by the S line, but that route had been changed to terminate on 8th Street. In 1958 this branch line was eliminated, and two miles (3.2 km) of the 3rd street portion were cut back to a loop on Wilton Place and 4th Street.

In 1958 the route was taken over by Los Angeles Metropolitan Transit Authority. The line was decommissioned in 1963 and converted to bus operation.

== See also ==
- Streetcars in Los Angeles
