= Streetcars in San Pedro =

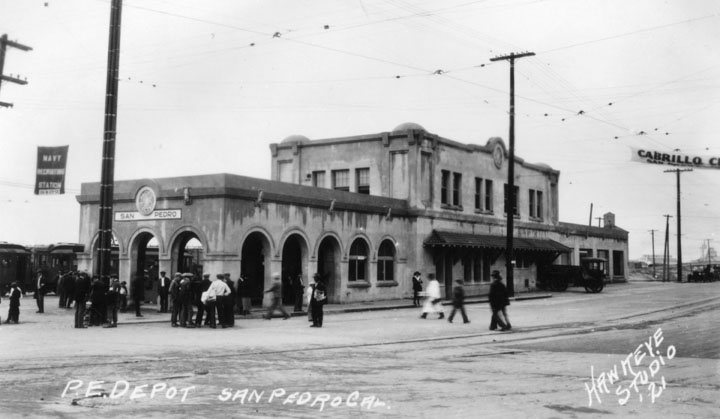
The San Pedro Pacific Electric Railway station, located at 510 S. Harbor Boulevard, 1921

San Pedro featured a network of streetcars between 1903 and 1958. The establishment of the Port of Los Angeles in the early 1900s spurred the development of the nearby city, and electric streetcars provided local transit services for workers and later military personnel. Pacific Electric was the primary operator in the city.

== Interurbans ==
California Pacific, a subsidiary of the Los Angeles Traction Company, began interurban service to San Pedro over a narrow-gauge line in 1903. Pacific Electric opened their competing San Pedro via Dominguez Line on May 21, 1905. Pacific Electric had additionally opened a line east to Long Beach, providing a connection between the two cities and allowing for trains to be run though on the Long Beach Line. All streetcar operations in San Pedro were consolidated under Pacific Electric in 1911. Several services offered a one-seat ride from San Pedro to downtown Los Angeles, Long Beach, and Balboa. The company ran special services to serve Catalina Island steamships. The last interurban service to San Pedro ran under the Los Angeles Metropolitan Transit Authority on December 7, 1958.

== Streetcars ==
=== Point Firmin Local ===
This line ran from the Pacific Electric depot at Sixth and Palos Verdes to Point Firmin via Sixth and Pacific. It was constructed between 1905 and 1906 as far south at Fourteenth Street and completed to Point Firmin in 1907. While it was the most popular route in San Pedro, competition from parallel bus operators tempered its ridership potential. Service ended in October 1934 and tracks were removed in the following years.

=== Outer Harbor Local ===
Cars were probably routed through to the La Rambla Line at its inner terminus. The line was entirely rerouted in October 1916, taking it off of city streets and to the Outer Harbor via a private right of way. Company records indicate service ended on the line after April 21, 1924, and the final years of service were very informal. The line continued to see infrequent passenger service whenever the U.S. fleet was stationed at San Pedro, as interurban cars from Los Angeles would end their runs at the harbor. This finally ended after September 1940.

=== La Rambla Local ===
Opening in 1906, this was one of the three major streetcar routes in San Pedro. Cars ran from Fourth and Palos Verdes via Fourth, Front, Sixth, Pacific, Fifth, a private right-of-way, and Alameda to First. Tracks on Fourth, Front, and Fifth were abandoned around 1915 and was likely routed through to the Outer Harbor Line. In 1928, this line accounted for 38% of San Pedro's local passenger traffic with just over 20% of the system's route miles. The last car operated over the line on January 23, 1938. This was the final streetcar line to operate in San Pedro.

=== West Basin Line ===
A minor line for local service, this line ran from San Pedro's Pacific Electric station via Front Street, a private right-of-way, another private right-of-way adjacent to Wilmington & San Pedro Road, B Street, and a private right-of-way to Wilmington Station. By 1911, service had been reduced to a single round trip in the afternoons. Pacific Electric was granted permission to end service in November 1931, though the final years of this is not well documented. While local service was discontinued, tracks were maintained and were seeing regular use by 1942 as the bridge route over the harbor was deemed hazardous during wartime.

=== Fourteenth Street Line ===
Originally an independent service, most cars had stopped running on Fourteenth Street by 1915, though it was still used as the ending of runs from the Outer Harbor Line. Rails remained in place until 1936.

=== Beacon Avenue–Palos Verdes Street Local Line ===
By the time of the Great Merger in 1911, service had likely been reduced to franchise service. The line was fully abandoned around May 5, 1915.

== Revival (2003–2015) ==
The Waterfront Red Car was a heritage streetcar operated by Port of Los Angeles. It ran over a former segment of the Pacific Electric route using electrified replica rolling stock.
