= P Train =

P Train may refer to:

- PATH (rail system)
- Phoenix Light Rail
- Pittsburgh Light Rail
- P (Los Angeles Railway)
