= U Line (disambiguation) =

U Line is a rapid transit line in Seoul, South Korea.

U Line or Uline may also refer to:

- Uline, an American industrial supply company
- Transilien Line U, a line of the Paris transport network
- U (Los Angeles Railway), a former streetcar line
- Yurikamome, a new transit in Tokyo, Japan, line code "U"
