= Oldest palm tree in Los Angeles =

Coordinates: 34.014041°N 118.283257°W

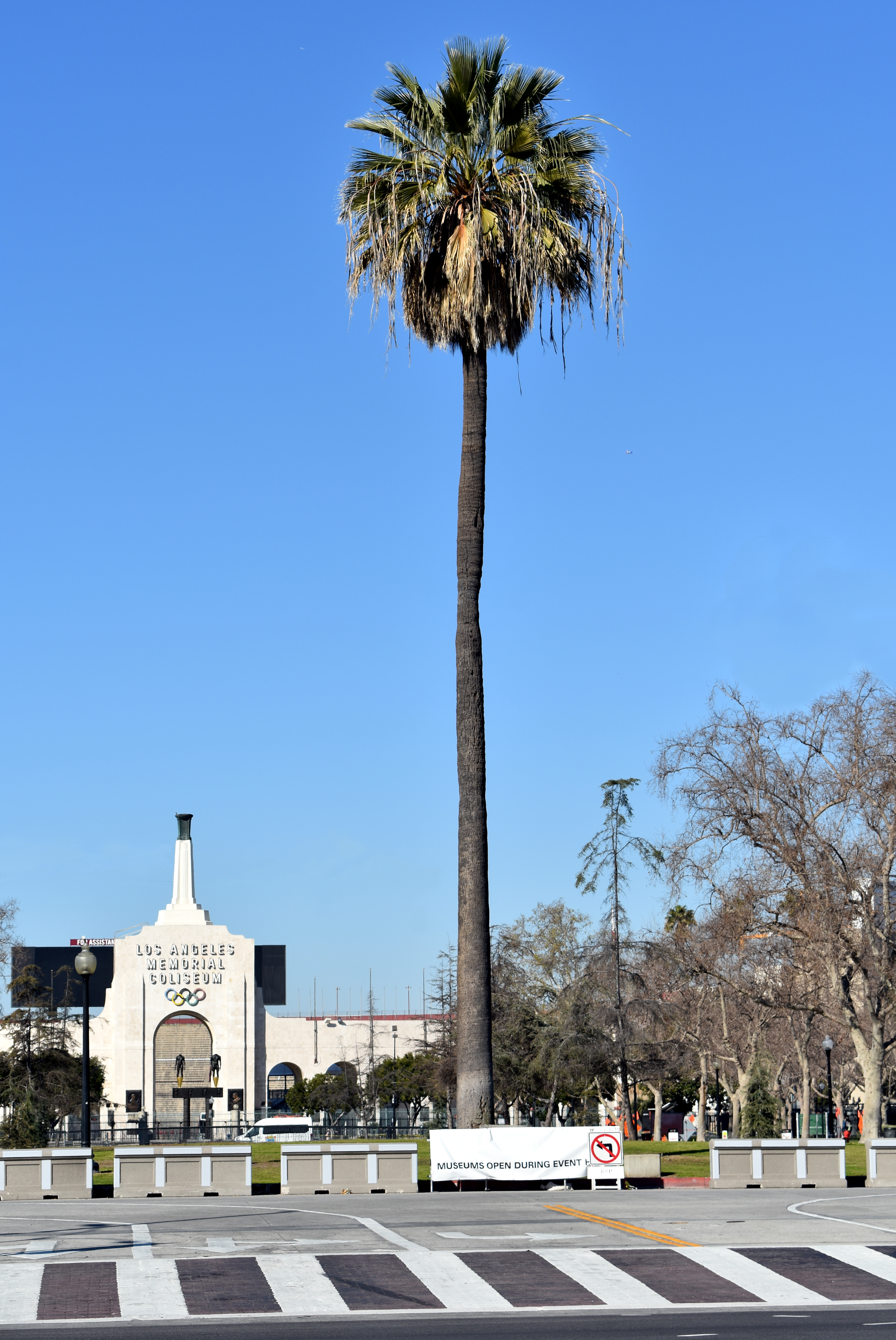
The palm tree is now in front of the Los Angeles Memorial Coliseum.

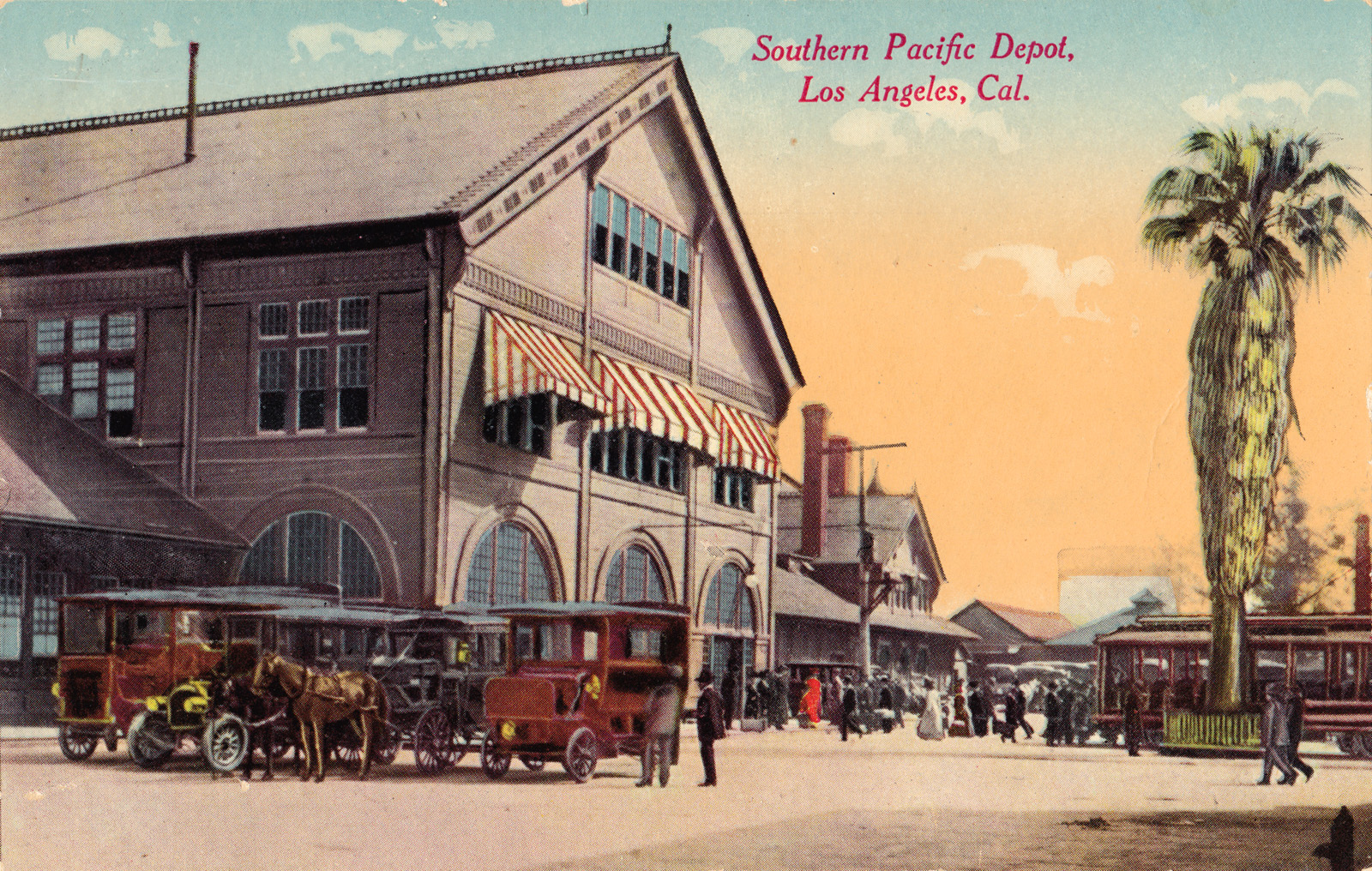
Early postcard photo of the tree, with the Arcade Depot at left

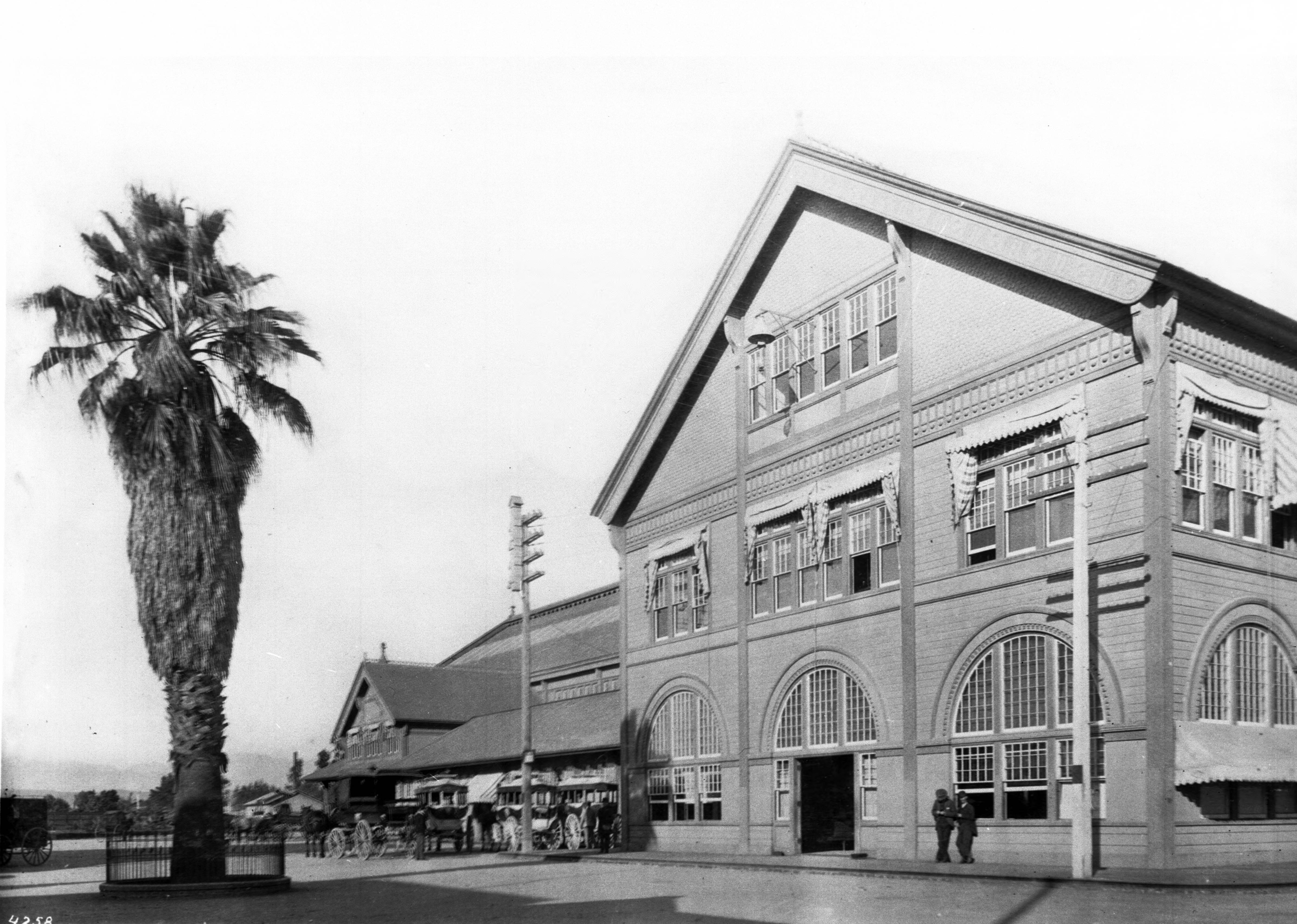
The tree and the station, 1895-1900

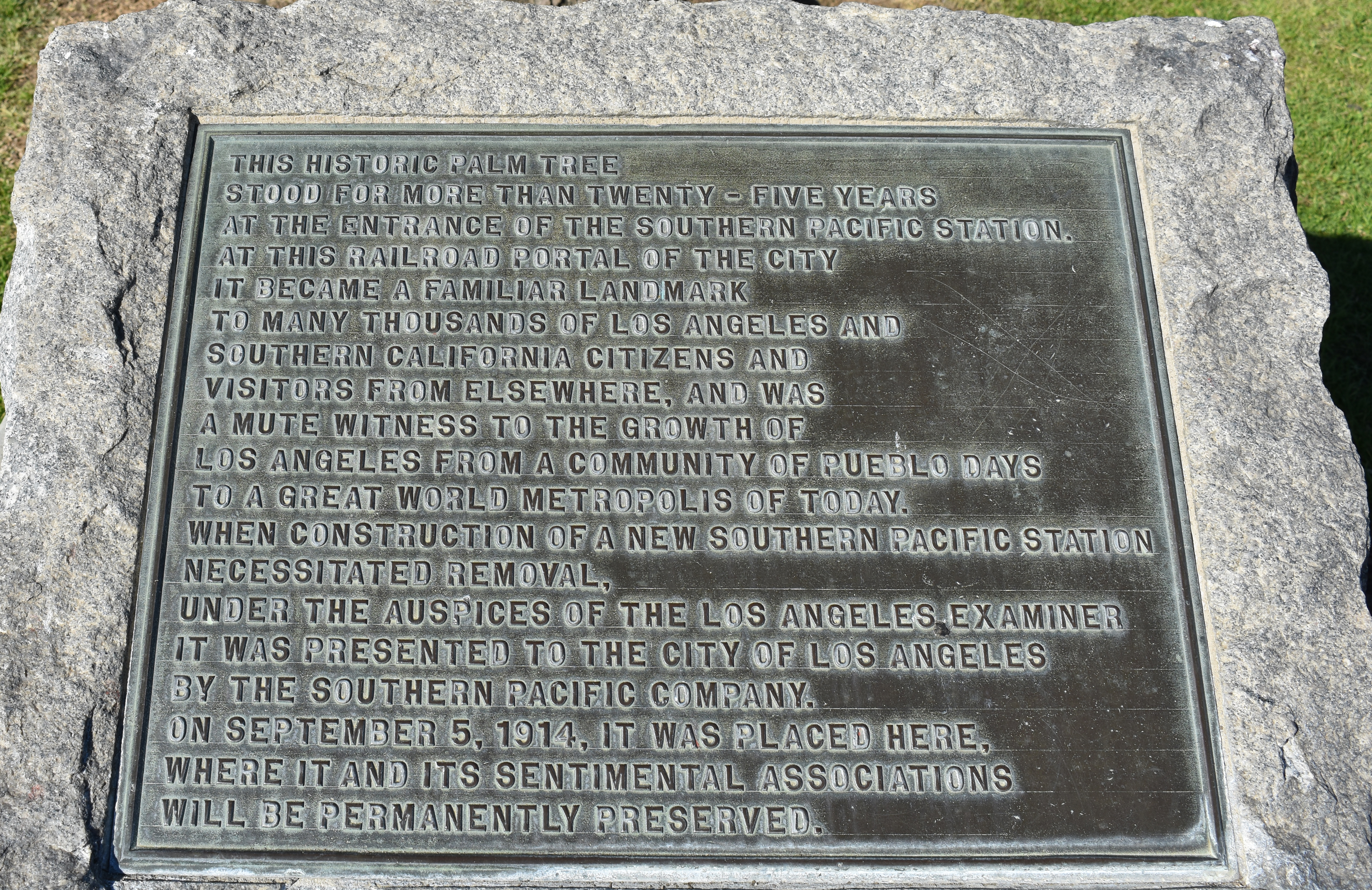
Commemorative plaque at tree base (click to enlarge)

The "Oldest" Palm Tree in Los Angeles is in Exposition Park, where it has survived for more than a century following its transplanting on September 5, 1914. It may be the most-often-moved palm in the city.

The Washingtonia filifera fan palm now on Exposition Park Drive just off Figueroa Street sits at the West 39th Street intersection.

== History ==
It started life in the suburban wilds until it was uprooted and moved, probably to San Pedro Street between 2nd and 3rd streets in the 1850s.

It was chosen in 1889 to be moved to a featured spot in front of the entrance to Arcade Depot, the Los Angeles station for the Southern Pacific Railroad, situated on Alameda Street between 4th and 5th Streets. As one historian recalls:

"It made the city’s first impression on tourists and transplants disembarking at the station, a sign that they had reached the promised land of sunshine after a long journey west."

A quarter of a century later, newspapers were describing the Arcade Depot as "ancient" and "unsightly and inadequate", so Southern Pacific moved its operations to Central Station in 1914 and the Arcade Depot was history. The tree some called the "Arcade Palm" found a new home in Exposition Park.

Since Exposition Park (known as Agricultural Park until it was renamed in 1913) was not complete in 1914, and the construction of the Los Angeles Memorial Coliseum was yet to come, it is uncertain whether the tree was moved to its present location in 1914, or whether it spent time elsewhere in the Park. Whatever its exact journey, despite a "dent" a little more than halfway up its trunk, perhaps due to the 1947–1950 drought or some other environmental assault, the tree — now 100 feet (30 m) tall — has flourished over three centuries and remains healthy. To reduce stress on the tree during frond removal, landscapers at Exposition Park now use a cherry picker as opposed to harmful tree climbing equipment that could leave additional pock marks in the tree's stem.

== See also ==
- List of individual trees
