= G-line (disambiguation) =

A G-line in Internet Relay Chat refers to a global network ban applied to a user.

G-line may also refer to:

- G (New York City Subway service)
- G Line (Los Angeles Metro), a bus rapid transit line in Los Angeles County, California
- G (Los Angeles Railway), former streetcar service
- G Line (RTD), commuter rail line serving Denver, Colorado
- Goubau line, a single-wire transmission line or waveguide
- The peak at 435.8 nm on the emission spectrum of mercury. See Mercury-vapor lamp § Emission line spectrum.
- Metro G Line (Minnesota), a planned bus rapid transit line in Minneapolis–Saint Paul, Minnesota
- G (SEPTA Metro), a trolley Line in Philadelphia.
