= Pico/Rimpau =

Area of Mid-City, Los Angeles

Pico/Rimpau is an area of Mid-City, Los Angeles, at the junction of Pico Boulevard, Rimpau Street, San Vicente Boulevard, Venice Boulevard, Vineyard Avenue and West Boulevard. This area is the location of several key former and current transportation hubs and retail shopping centers for the Los Angeles area.

Retail shopping centers included the innovative landmark Sears Pico store, Midtown Crossing and Midtown Shopping Center.

In public transit, the Pico/Rimpau Transit Center remains a major bus station for LA's Metro and Santa Monica's Big Blue Bus, while Rimpau Loop and Vineyard Junction are landmarks from the city's electric railway history.

== Transportation hubs ==
=== Vineyard Junction ===
Vineyard Rimpau Loop

History
- Opened: 1897
- Closed: December 28, 1950 (Pacific Electric); March 31, 1963 (Los Angeles Railway)
Former Services
Preceding station	Pacific Electric	Following station
Roberto toward Rustic Canyon	Venice Short Line	Western Avenue toward Hill Street
Rosemary toward Santa Monica	Sawtelle	Western Avenue toward Hill Street
Rosemary toward Santa Monica	Westgate	Western Avenue toward Hill Street
Roberto toward Clifton	Redondo Beach via Playa del Rey	Western Avenue toward Hill Street
Rimpau Loop
Preceding station	Los Angeles Railway	Following station
Terminus	P	Pico and Crenshaw toward Dozier Loop
Location

In the late 1800s, the Pacific Electric (PE) established its Vineyard Junction depot, near the intersection of Venice and San Vicente. Lines ran on Venice Boulevard between Downtown Los Angeles and Vineyard Junction, where they would split with some cars heading further along Venice Boulevard to Venice and Redondo Beach, while others went along Boulevard toward West Hollywood, Beverly Hills and Santa Monica. In 1924, PE added a more direct motorbus between Vineyard Junction and Santa Monica via Pico Boulevard.

Vineyard Junction was the site of an accident on July 13, 1913, in which two wooden streetcars crashed into each other, with 14 people dead and 200 people injured. As a result, the Pacific Electric ordered its future cars to be made of steel, and it was recommended that signaling be introduced on the PE's lines.

=== Rimpau Loop ===
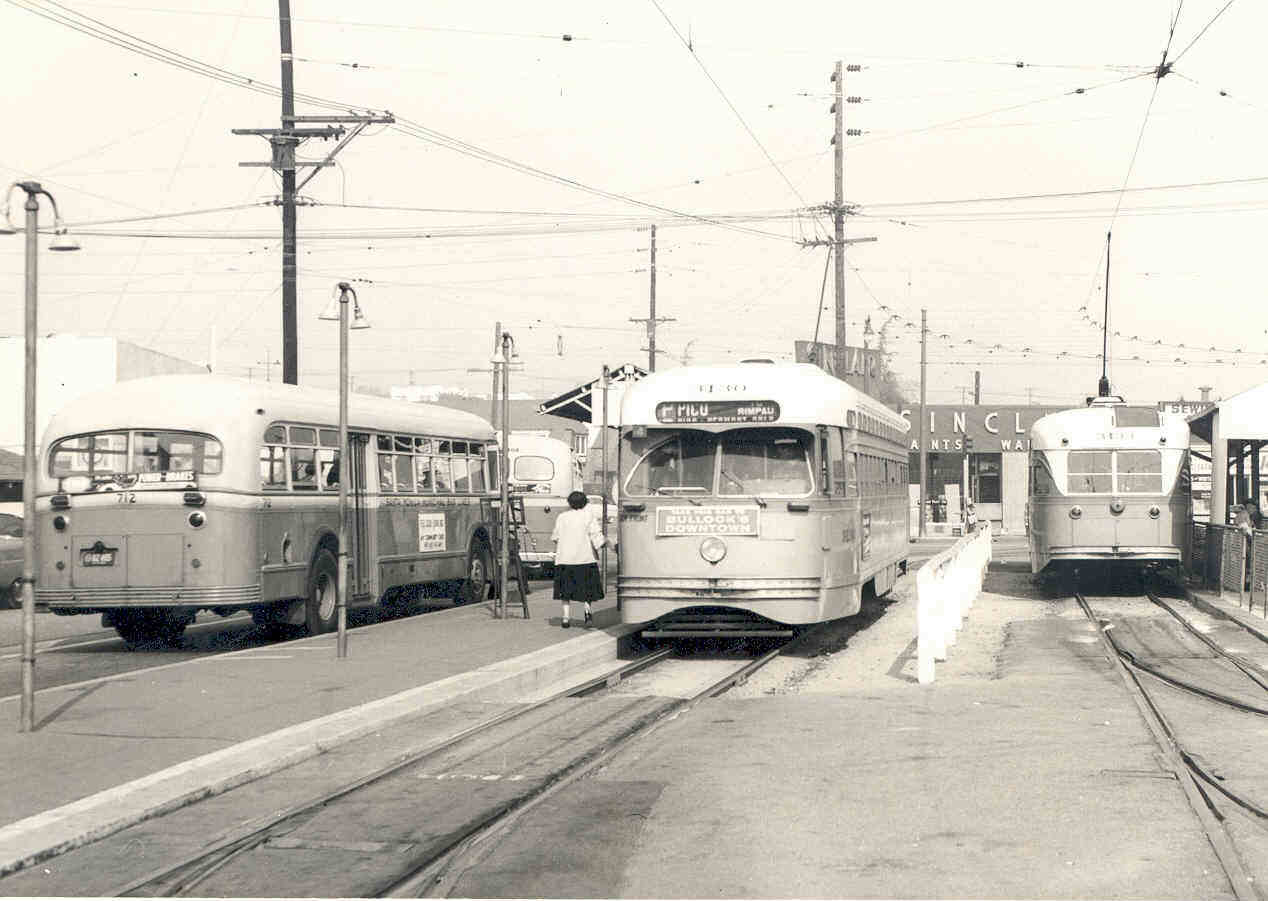
Rimpau Loop in 1956

In 1920, the Los Angeles Railway ("Yellow Cars") extended its "P" Pico Blvd. streetcar line to Rimpau Street, about a block away from the PE's Vineyard Junction.

Dissatisfied with PE’s service and fares, the City of Santa Monica began running its own bus service along Pico Boulevard on April 14, 1928. The combination of Santa Monica’s bus and the Yellow Car offered a lower fare than PE between Santa Monica and LA. PE eventually discontinued its Pico bus line, and in 1935, the Los Angeles Railway and Santa Monica made their partnership permanent with the construction of the Rimpau Loop, a bus-to-streetcar transfer station.

The P Yellow Car line was transferred to the Los Angeles Metropolitan Transit Authority in 1958. Service was converted to motor coach operation on March 31, 1963.

Santa Monica was prevented from operating any buses east of Rimpau, and the transfer arrangement remained in place for decades.

=== Pico/Rimpau Transit Center ===
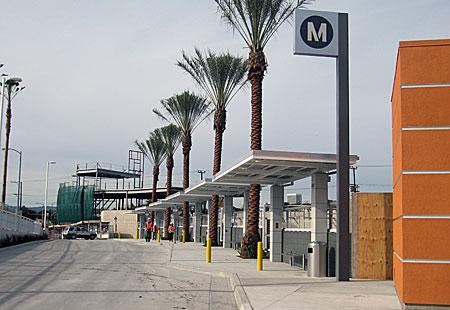
Pico/Rimpau Transit Center in January 2006

In 2006, as part of the redevelopment of the former Sears Pico site, a new "Pico/Rimpau Transit Center" was built, offering more passenger amenities.

As of 2021, Big Blue Bus (the current name of Santa Monica Municipal Bus Lines) still operates Line 7 between Pico/Rimpau and Santa Monica and the Los Angeles County Metropolitan Transportation Authority operates Line 30 between Pico/Rimpau and Downtown Los Angeles.

The Pico/Rimpau Transit Center is a proposed station on the K Line Northern Extension light rail, which will open in 2047.

== Shopping centers ==
=== Sears Pico (1939–2003) ===
Sears Pico was a Sears branch that opened here on October 19, 1939. The designer was John Raben, who assisted Jock Peters in the design of Bullocks Wilshire. It had 202,640 square feet (18,826 m^{2}) of retail space over two floors plus a basement, the largest Sears store on the West Coast at the time. Pico and Rimpau was not a major shopping district, but Sears had been having success since 1925 doing things differently from other retail chains, which placed their stores in downtown shopping districts, by instead opening freestanding stores in working-to-middle-class suburban areas of major U.S. cities, designed for access primarily by car, although in the case of the Pico store, there was easy access by transit.

Sears Pico claimed one of the largest street display windows in the city at the time, at 18 by 40 feet. It had parking for 360 cars, including an 80,000-square-foot (7,400 m^{2}) rooftop parking deck, from which customers parking there would descend via escalator into the store. From the roof parking lot, the store entrance was not utilitarian but in the style of a main entrance. All of this was novel and futuristic at the time. The Los Angeles Times noted that at the time, "people would come from miles around to see the rooftop parking deck".

Other features considered progressive at the time were streamlined escalators, "windowless construction" (no windows to the outside from the selling floor), and air conditioning. Moreover, the floor plan was open instead of divided into sections, and the entire syncretic architectural design of the store was based around the needs of the selling floor. Sears boasted that, "a rival merchandising executive offered tribute: 'in my long experience in the retail field, I have yet to witness a unit which equals Sears' Pico store in practical efficiency, merchandise engineering, operation, layout and presentation of merchandise'."

By the 1990s, the Pico/Rimpau area was surrounded by mostly working-class residents: Central American and Korean immigrants, and African Americans. Middle-class shoppers who originally shopped at Sears Pico/Rimpau, were lost to an increasing array of stores in the central/western Los Angeles: the Miracle Mile shopping district, Crenshaw Center (opened 1947), Fox Hills Mall (opened 1975), and Beverly Center (opened 1982).

The area suffered damage from the 1965 Watts riots and further with the 1992 Rodney King riots. In 1988, Sears built a store in the newly renovated and expanded Baldwin Hills Crenshaw Plaza, formerly Crenshaw Center. As a result of this, then new, Sears store, this Sears location closed in late 1987 and another Sears in Inglewood closed in 1988.

By the mid-1990s, Sears had sold the store. The first floor was occupied by a discount hardware store and the second by a bazaar of independent vendors, in California known as an indoor swap meet.

=== Midtown Crossing (2012–present) ===
The Sears-Pico building was demolished around 2003 and replaced by the Midtown Crossing in 2012, a development with 330,000 square feet (31,000 m^{2}) of retail space on 11 acres (4.5 ha). The center was the result of a 2010 plan in which the city provided $34 million worth of loans and subsidies to CIM Group for its construction. Lowe's, Smart & Final Extra!, PetSmart and Ross Dress for Less are the main big-box anchors.

=== Midtown Shopping Center (1960–present) ===
Midtown Shopping Center opened to the west of the large Sears store in 1960. The development had 200,000 square feet (19,000 m^{2}) of retail space, originally anchored by Thrifty Drug Stores, J. J. Newberry five and dime, and a Safeway supermarket which later became a Boys Market, and later an Alpha-Beta Supermarket which, in 1995, merged with Ralphs.

Much of the center was destroyed in the 1992 Los Angeles riots.

Today the center is anchored by a Ralphs supermarket, a CVS Pharmacy, a Living Spaces furniture store and a Planet Fitness gym.
