= D (Los Angeles Railway) =

Overview
- Locale: Los Angeles
- Termini: Bonnie Brae Street and Beverly Boulevard; Central Station

Service
- Type: Streetcar
- System: Los Angeles Railway
- Daily ridership: 3,632 (1940)

History
- Opened: 1920
- Closed: August 3, 1947

Technical
- Track gauge: 3 ft 6 in (1,067 mm)
- Electrification: Overhead line, 600 V DC

D was a streetcar route in Los Angeles, California. The line was operated by the Los Angeles Railway from 1895 to 1947.

== History ==
=== Bonnie Brae Line (1895–1920) ===
During the early days of LARy, the route ("Bonnie Brae") had to compete with multiple other streetcar companies, running a circuitous route to avoid them between Central Station and the northern portion of Westlake, by way of 5th Street, Olive Street, 6th Street, Figueroa Street, 7th Street, Alvarado Street, Webster Avenue, and Bonnie Brae Street.

Following the Great Merger of 1911, Pacific Electric divested most of its Los Angeles local routes to LARy, allowing D to use former Los Angeles Inter-Urban Electric Railway trackage on West 6th street Westlake. The Figueroa and 7th street portions of the line were eliminated, shortening the trip by one-quarter mile (0.40 km).

=== D Line (1920–1947) ===
In 1921, the Bonnie Brae Line was given the letter designation D. Cars originated at Fifth and Central, running west via Fifth; Olive; Sixth; a private right of way; and Larchmont as far as Melrose. Early in the 1920s, the 5th Street segment was extended so that 3, U, and D lines could run straight along 5th Street through Downtown and shortening the route by an additional one-quarter mile (0.4 km). This made D little more than a branch of two much more popular routes. Service to Bonnie Brae was resumed in January 1925.

With the closure of Central Station in 1940, and no major destinations on East 5th Street, ridership downtown reduced significantly (though the removal of the I line improved ridership in Westlake). Ridership along the route spiked in World War II, necessitating extending the service down U line tracks to Slauson. The route was removed by Los Angeles Transit Lines in 1947, largely replaced with trolley coach service.

== See also ==
- Streetcars in Los Angeles
