= California State Route 187 =

Highway in California

State Route 187
- Venice Boulevard
- SR 187 highlighted in red

Route information
- Maintained by Caltrans
- Length: 0.22 mi (350 m)

Major junctions
- West end: Comey Avenue near Culver City (State Maintenance)
- East end: I-10 near Culver City

Location
- Country: United States
- State: California
- Counties: Los Angeles

Highway system
- State highways in California; Interstate; US; State; Scenic; History; Pre‑1964; Unconstructed; Deleted; Freeways
← SR 186	→ SR 188

State Route 187 (SR 187) is a state highway in the U.S. state of California that forms part of Venice Boulevard in Los Angeles. Though some maps and signs may mark SR 187 as continuous between Lincoln Boulevard (State Route 1) in the Venice district to Interstate 10 in the South Robertson district, control of the highway has been relinquished in piecemeal segments to the City of Los Angeles since 2015, and thus those segments are no longer officially part of the state highway system. As of 2025, only the portion surrounding the Interstate 10 interchange between Comey Avenue and Cadillac Avenue officially remains under state control.

== Route description ==
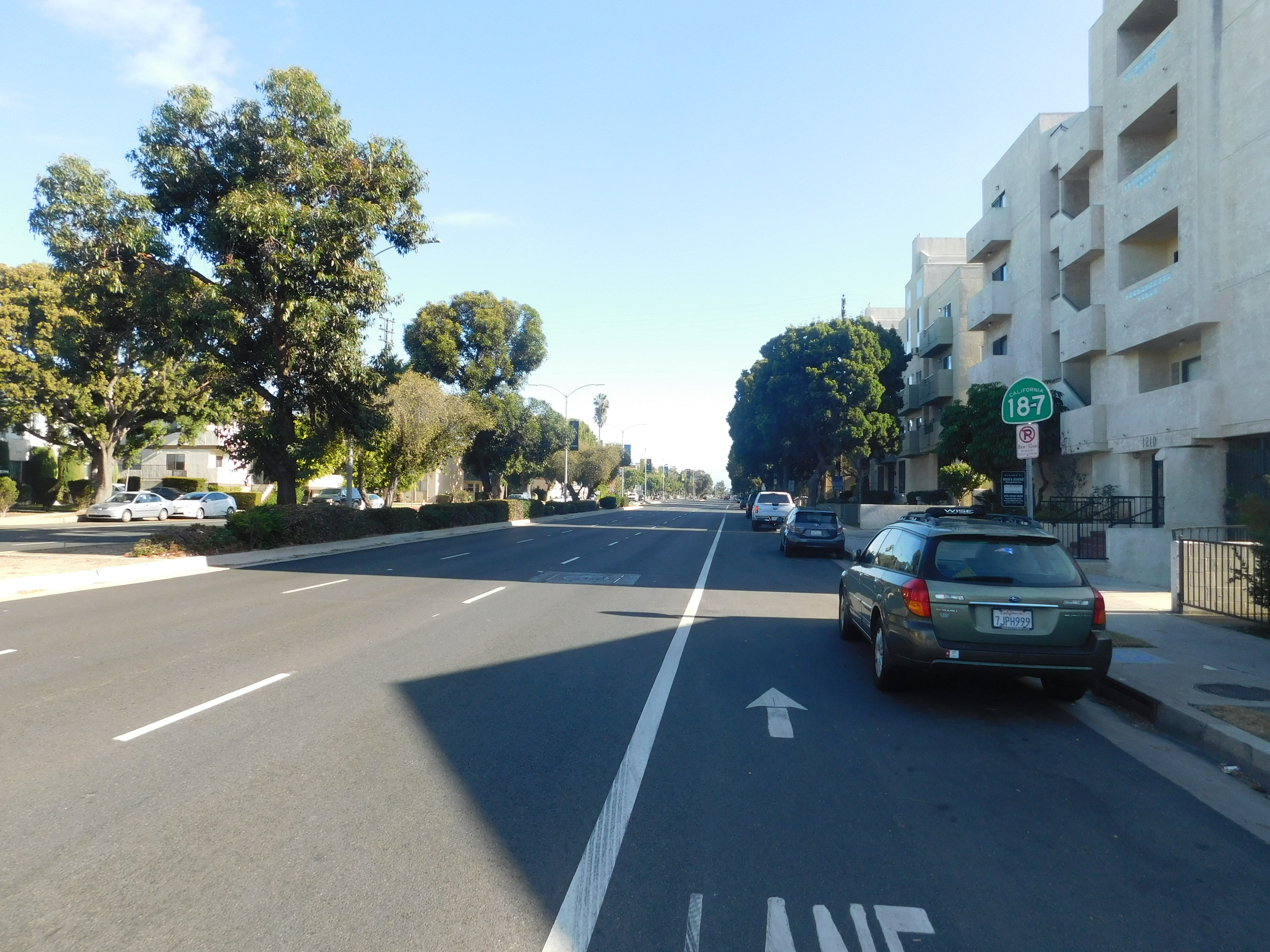
CA 187 heading east through Venice

Route 187 is defined in section 487, subsection (a) of the California Streets and Highways Code, last amended by the California State Legislature in 2015, and that the highway is "from Lincoln Boulevard to Route 10 via Venice Boulevard". Subdivision (b) permits the state to relinquish control of the entire length of the highway to the City of Los Angeles.

The relinquishment of piecemeal segments of SR 187 in Los Angeles began in 2016. Prior to, Venice Boulevard began assumed the state route designation at Lincoln Boulevard (State Route 1). Proceeding easterly, the highway then passed through the Mar Vista neighborhood. Further east, it briefly forms the boundary between Palms and Culver City and passes near Sony Pictures Studios. Continuing northeast into the South Robertson neighborhood of Los Angeles, the SR 187 designation then terminates at the intersection with Cadillac Avenue and the ramp carrying traffic from westbound I-10. as of 2025, only the portion surrounding the I-10 interchange between Comey Avenue and Cadillac Avenue remain under state control. Once that is also relinquished, the state highway will cease to exist.

SR 187 is part of the National Highway System, a network of highways that are considered essential to the country's economy, defense, and mobility by the Federal Highway Administration.

== History ==
Route 163 was defined in 1961 as a route from the ocean in Santa Monica to Route 173, routed along Pacific Avenue and Venice Boulevard. This was redefined as SR 187 in the 1964 state highway renumbering. In 1988, the part of SR 187 in Santa Monica was removed from the state highway system. The part of the route from the southern boundary of Santa Monica to Lincoln Boulevard was removed in 1994.

The California State Legislature passed AB 810 in 2015, allowing the state to relinquish the entire length of the state highway to the City of Los Angeles.

== Major intersections ==
Except where prefixed with a letter, postmiles were measured on the road as it was in 1964, based on the alignment that existed at the time, and do not necessarily reflect current mileage. Postmile prefixes include: R reflecting a realignment in the route since then, M indicating a second realignment, L referring to an overlap due to a correction or change, and T indicating postmiles classified as temporary. Segments that remain unconstructed or have been relinquished to local control may be omitted. The entire route is in Los Angeles, Los Angeles County.

Postmile	Destinations	Notes
3.50	Venice Boulevard – Venice Beach	Continuation beyond SR 1
3.50	SR 1 (Lincoln Boulevard)	Former US 101 Alt.; west end of SR 187
4.78	Centinela Avenue	
5.83	I-405 (San Diego Freeway) – Long Beach, Santa Monica	Interchange; I-405 exit 52; former SR 7
5.91	Sepulveda Boulevard	
6.62	Overland Avenue	
7.63	Culver Boulevard	
8.64	La Cienega Boulevard	
8.69	Comey Avenue	West end of state maintenance
8.80	I-10 (Santa Monica Freeway)	Interchange; I-10 exit 7A (as La Cienega Boulevard eastbound); east end of SR 187
8.91	Cadillac Avenue, Venice Boulevard	Continuation beyond I-10; Cadillac Avenue serves Kaiser Permanente West Los Angeles Medical Center
1.000 mi = 1.609 km; 1.000 km = 0.621 mi

== Notable incidents ==
A gasoline pipeline explosion occurred June 16, 1976 on the street with a death of toll seven and twenty-one people with injuries requiring hospitalization.

Rapper Snoop Dogg posed in front of a SR 187 sign in 1993, as a reference to Section 187 of the California Penal Code that defines the crime of murder and the song with Dr. Dre that he collaborated with (the shield has since been removed).
