= Central Station (Los Angeles) =

Former Southern Pacific train stop

Los Angeles Central Station
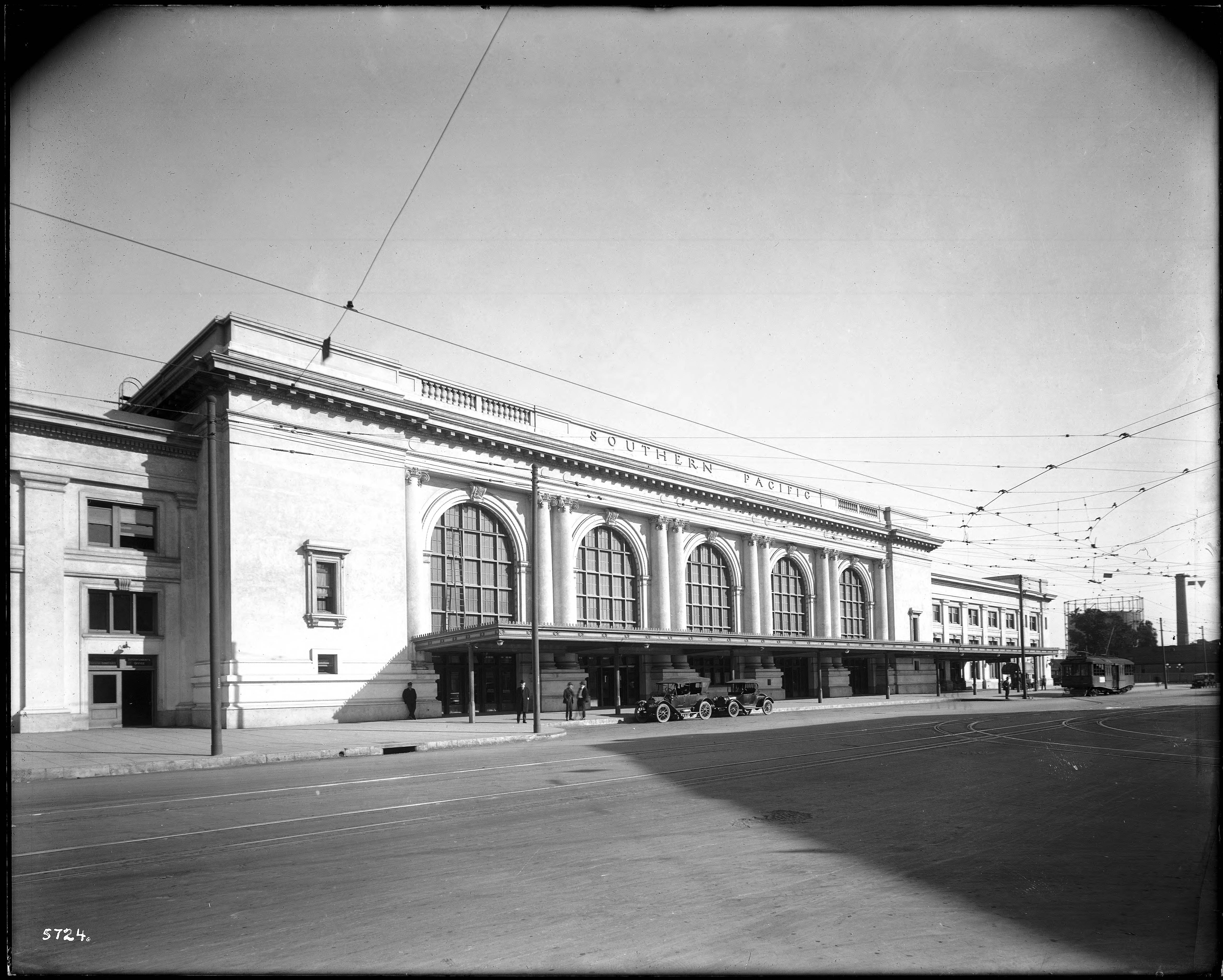
- Exterior view of the Southern Pacific Depot, c. 1918

General information
- Location: Fifth and Central; Los Angeles, California; United States
- Coordinates: 34°02′32″N 118°14′22″W
- Lines: Southern Pacific Railroad, Union Pacific

History
- Opened: December 1, 1914
- Closed: 1939 (passengers); August 22, 1956 (demolished)

Services
Preceding station	Southern Pacific Railroad	Following station
River toward San Francisco	Coast Line	Terminus
Terminus	Sunset Route	Alhambra toward New Orleans
Terminus	Los Angeles – San Pedro	Florence toward San Pedro
Preceding station	Union Pacific Railroad	Following station
Terminus	Los Angeles and Salt Lake Railroad	East Los Angeles toward Salt Lake City
Preceding station	Pacific Electric	Following station
Terminus	Los Angeles SP–Pasadena SP (until 1933)	Aliso and San Pedro toward Pasadena SP
6th and San Pedro toward Richardson	Edendale; Local (until 1940)	Terminus
Vermont toward San Pedro	Los Angeles SP–Long Beach–San Pedro (until 1939)	Terminus
Preceding station	Los Angeles Railway	Following station
5th and San Pedro toward Larchmont and Melrose	3	Terminus
5th and San Pedro toward Bonnie Brae and Beverly	D	Central and 6th toward Central and Slauson
5th and San Pedro toward Vermont and Florence	U	Central and 6th toward Central and Slauson
Location

Central Station was the Southern Pacific Railroad's main passenger terminal in Los Angeles, California. It was formerly on Central Avenue at Fifth Street, in eastern Downtown Los Angeles. The primary hub for Southern Pacific's passenger operations in Southern California, it was served by the Sunset Limited, Coast Daylight, Golden State, and other named trains. The station replaced the company's previous Los Angeles terminal, Arcade Depot, and was often referred to by the name of the older facility.

== History ==
The Southern Pacific Railroad (SP) was the most used of the three mainline railroads that serviced Los Angeles in the early 20th century (the others being the Los Angeles and Salt Lake Railroad and Santa Fe Railroad), though their main Arcade Depot had fallen into a state of disrepair by 1913. Southern Pacific began investigating the replacement of the aging station as early as that year in anticipation of increased passenger numbers to the state as a result of hosting both the San Francisco Panama–Pacific International Exposition and San Diego Panama–California Exposition in 1915.

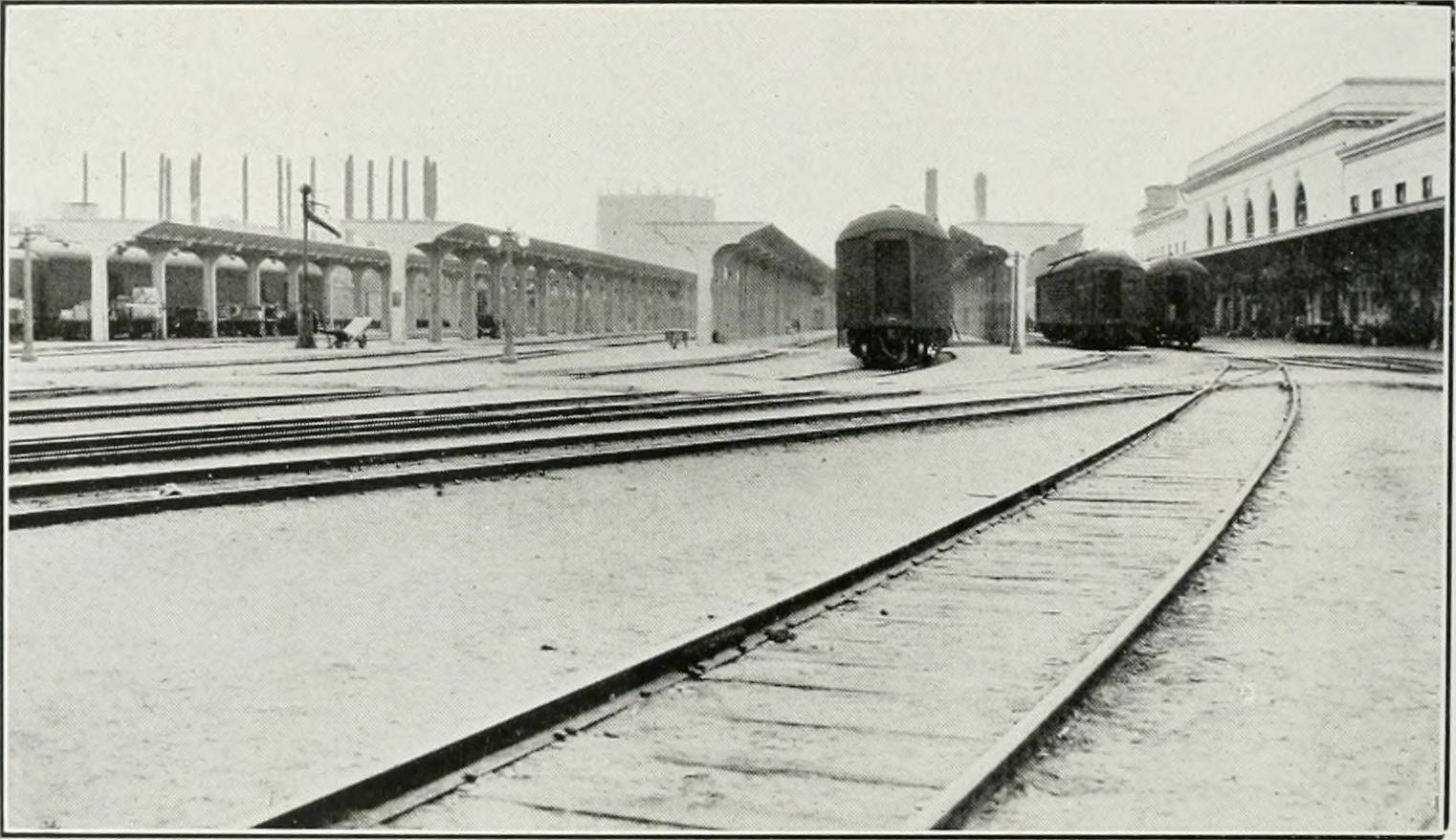
Station platforms and tracks seen from the north

Passenger trains began operating at the station's new tracks on December 1, 1914. The station building opened on May 2, 1915. In 1918, just over 50% of all passenger traffic was provided via Southern Pacific and Central Station. The Union Pacific Railroad, which had its main Los Angeles train station (built 1891) damaged in a fire, began operating from the station in 1924.

In addition to long-distance trains, the station was served by the two local electric railways. Pacific Electric Red Cars stopped at the station until 1950, calling at Ceres and Central on the west side of the building. Passengers could get cars to Sierra Vista, Pasadena, Edendale, Long Beach and San Pedro. By 1938, the Los Angeles Railway Yellow streetcar lines D, U, and 3 stopped in front of the building on Central Avenue.

In 1926, the citizens of Los Angeles voted 51% to 49% to build a union station. All long-distance passenger services were transferred to the new Los Angeles Union Station upon that building's completion in 1939. Pacific Electric cars continued to Central Station until September 1940, after which trips were rerouted to the Subway Terminal Building.

The Central Station was demolished on August 22, 1956.

== Design ==
The station was designed by the firm of Messrs, Parkinson & Bergstrom. Features which governed its design included:

- Pedestrian and track grade separation
- Separation of incoming and outgoing passengers
- Amenities for waiting passengers
- Adequate baggage facilities
- An efficient and convenient train ticket office
- A centralized information bureau
- Additional operational facilities including a power plant, kitchen and dining room, office, private car yards, etc.

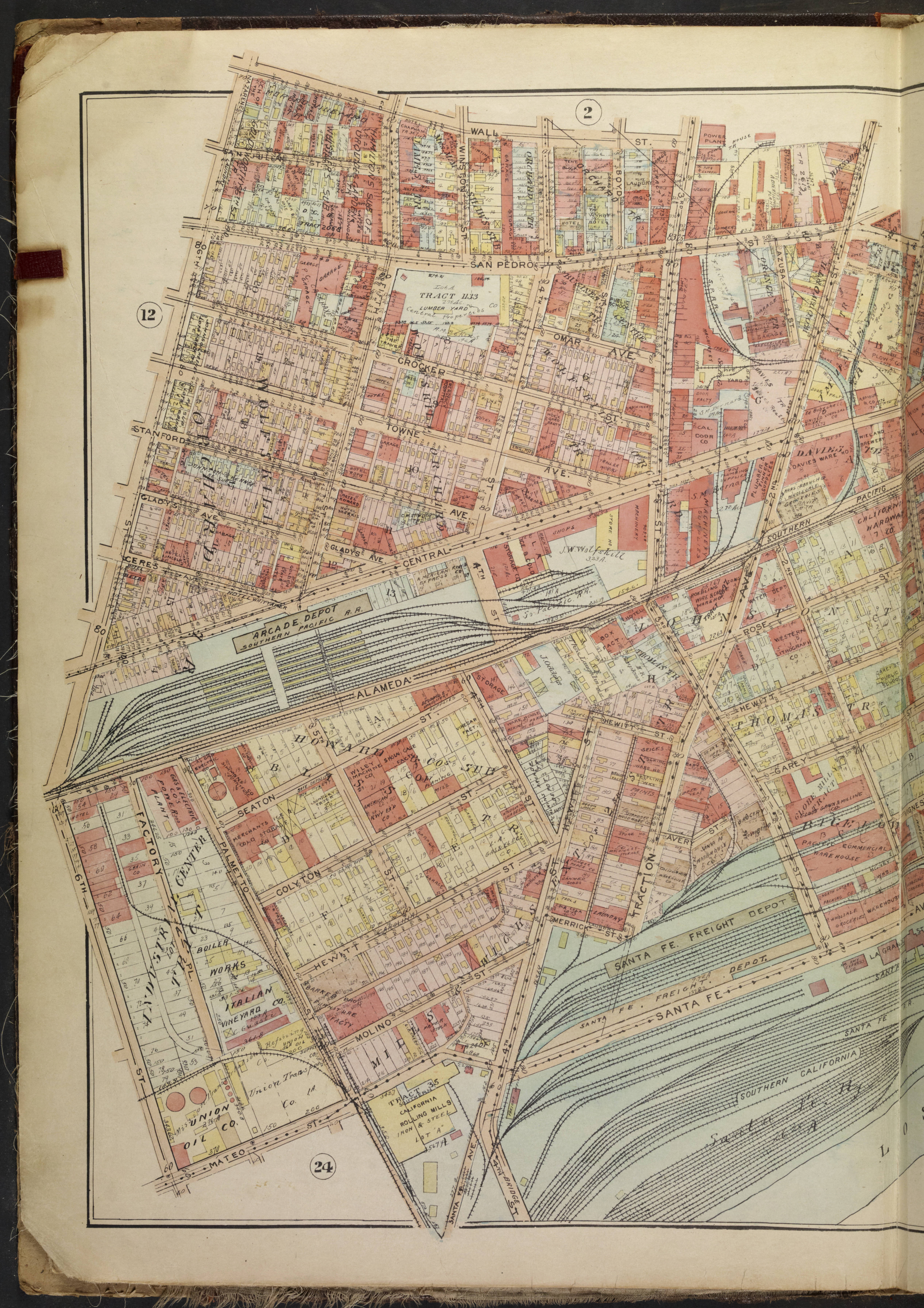
1921 Los Angeles real estate map
