= Arcade Depot =

Former Southern Pacific rail terminal, Los Angeles

Los Angeles Arcade Depot
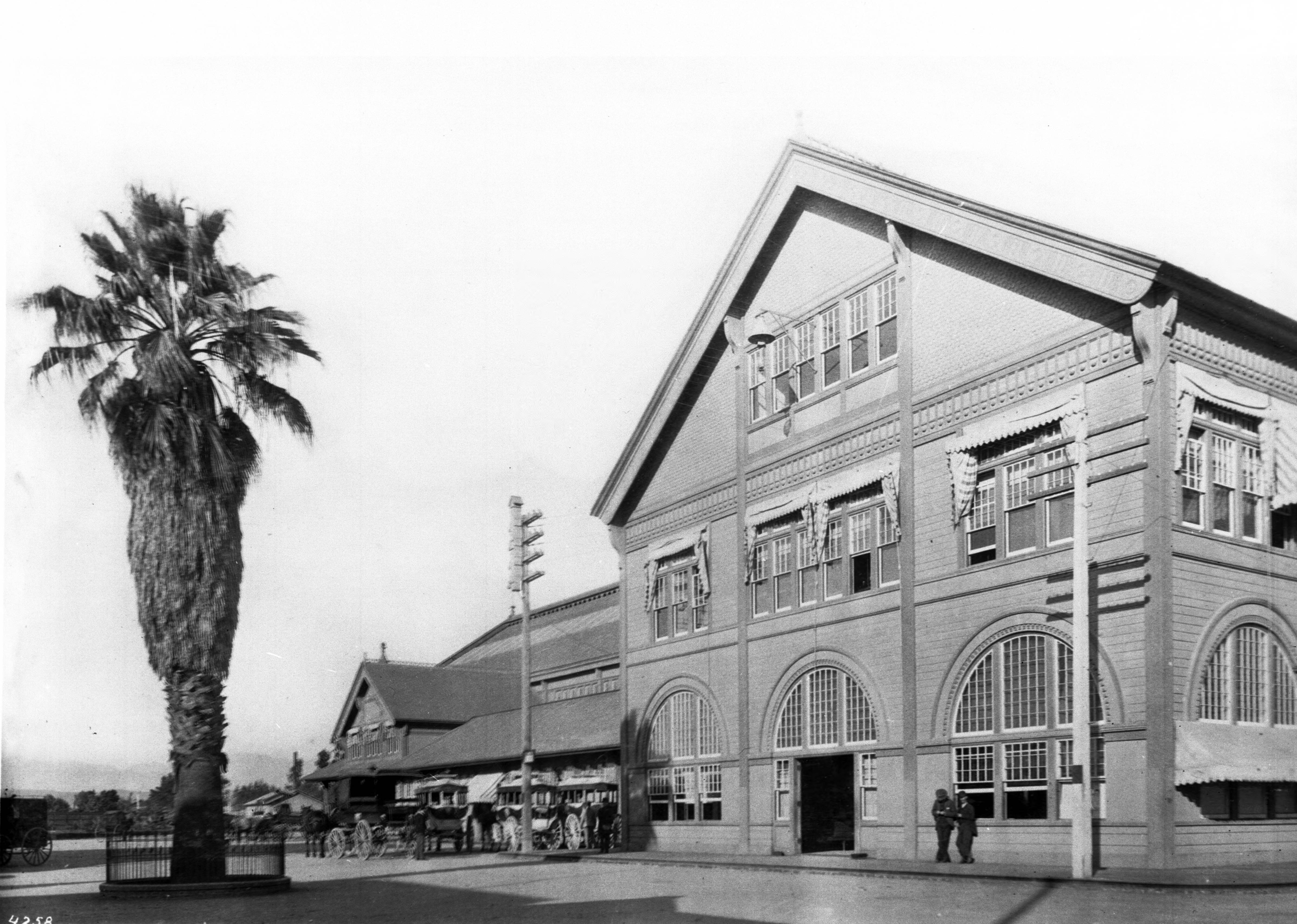
- Arcade Depot c. 1895–1900

General information
- Location: Fourth and Alameda; Los Angeles, California
- Coordinates: 34.0418°N 118.2389°W
- Owner: Southern Pacific Railroad

History
- Opened: 1888; 138 years ago
- Closed: 1914; 112 years ago

Services
Preceding station	Southern Pacific Railroad	Following station
Glendale toward San Francisco	Coast Line	Terminus
First Street toward New Orleans Union Station	Sunset Route	Terminus
First Street toward Pasadena	Pasadena Branch	Terminus
First Street toward River	Los Angeles – San Pedro	Clement Junction toward San Pedro
First Street toward River	Santa Monica Branch	Clement Junction toward Port Los Angeles
Preceding station	Pacific Electric	Following station
6th and San Pedro toward Richardson	Edendale; Local	Terminus
Terminus	Los Angeles SP–Pasadena SP (1912–1914)	Aliso and San Pedro toward Pasadena SP
Terminus	Sierra Vista; Local (1912–1914)	6th and San Pedro toward Sierra Vista
Location

The Arcade Depot was the main Southern Pacific Railroad passenger railway station of Los Angeles, California, between 1888 and 1914. It was located on Alameda Street, between 5th and 6th Streets. The station consolidated intercity services at a location closer to Downtown Los Angeles than the previous terminal, the San Fernando Street Depot.

== History ==
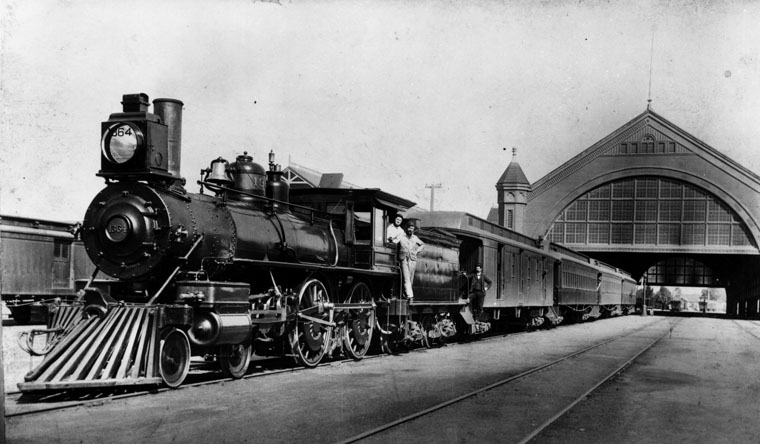
Steam train at Arcade Depot (1891)

The land for the station was furnished to Southern Pacific by the City of Los Angeles, which was intended to lure the railroad to town. The Victorian style wooden station was completed in 1888. It was located on the site of the former orange groves of William Wolfskill, on the east side of Downtown Los Angeles towards the Los Angeles River. It was a massive wooden structure, 500 feet (150 m) long, with skylights and an arched roof clearing 90 feet (27 m) above the platforms below. A palm tree was replanted outside the station during its opening year.

The station replaced the Southern Pacific River Station as the main L.A. passenger terminal, which was located next to a freight yard further outside of downtown L.A.

In addition to mainline steam trains, the depot was also served by Pacific Electric Red Cars.

By 1913, the Arcade Depot had fallen into a state of disrepair and calls were made for its replacement in anticipation of increased passenger traffic. The station was closed in 1914 when the SP opened the Los Angeles Central Station just to the north. The old depot was demolished soon after to make room for outdoor platforms serving the new station.
