= River Station =

Railroad passenger station in California, US

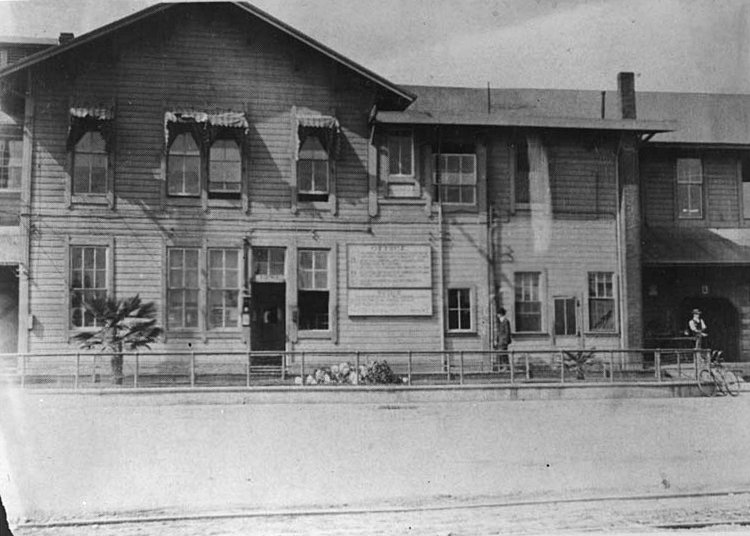
- The second River Station

General information
- Location: The Cornfield, Los Angeles State Historic Park (site), Los Angeles, California
- Coordinates: 34.0687°N 118.2311°W
- Owner: Southern Pacific Railroad

History
- Opened: June 1877; 149 years ago
- Closed: 1915; 111 years ago
- Rebuilt: 1883
- Former names: San Fernando Street Depot

Former services
Preceding station	Southern Pacific Railroad	Following station
Glendale toward San Francisco	Coast Line	Central Station Terminus
Glendale toward Oakland Pier	San Joaquin Valley Line	Central Station Terminus
Terminus	Los Angeles – San Pedro	Naud Junction toward San Pedro
Terminus	Santa Monica Branch	Naud Junction toward Port Los Angeles
Terminus	Sunset Route	Shorb toward New Orleans
Location

River Station, earlier known as the San Fernando Street Depot and later commonly referred to as old River Station, was a Southern Pacific Railroad passenger station location, southwest of the Los Angeles River and north of Downtown, in Los Angeles, California. The original building served as the company's primary Los Angeles terminal until the opening of Arcade Depot in 1888. A rebuilt station would continue to operate as a passenger stop until 1915 when it was retained for freight and storage. The location for both stations was at the Southern Pacific's Los Angeles freight yard, at the north end of present-day Chinatown in Central Los Angeles. It was demolished in 1940, though the site is noted within "The Cornfield" section of Los Angeles State Historic Park.

== History ==
=== First station (1875−1883) ===
The station in Los Angeles utilized by Southern Pacific was that of the Los Angeles & San Pedro Railroad, which was acquired by SP in 1873. It was located at Alameda and Commercial. The railroad built a new wooden station on San Fernando Street in 1875, though passenger and logistical operations did not move here until June 16, 1877. Transcontinental trains started serving the station in 1881. The two-story building had both women's and men's waiting rooms and later had a hotel and restaurants added to it. The station was assigned the first telephone number in Los Angeles in 1882.

=== Second station (1883−1902) ===
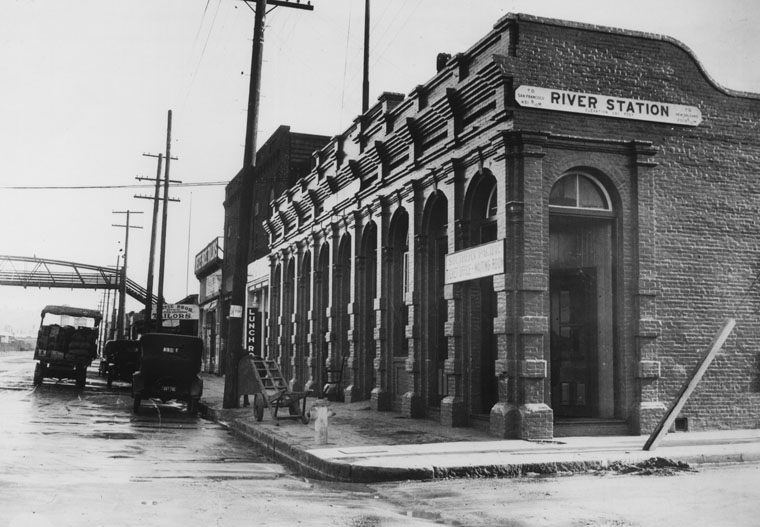
The third River Station, c. 1919

The second station was built in 1883 on the west side of San Fernando Street opposite the termination of Sotello Street, near the freight depot. It was a brick Romanesque Revival style building. This was the arrival point of many migrants drawn to the city during the land boom of the mid-1880s. The name of the station was officially changed to River Station in July 1893. As development had coalesced around what became Downtown Los Angeles, Southern Pacific responded by building the Arcade Depot in 1888, diminishing the importance of River Station. This station building was razed in June 1902.

=== Third station ===
After the second station was torn down, the freight facilities were greatly expanded to include a new 600-by-50-foot (183 m × 15 m) depot featuring 32 cargo bays for transloading freight to and from trucks along with five scales and a new 200-foot-long (61 m) freight platform. Southern Pacific's passenger accommodations were moved to a nearby storefront to maintain service. The second River Station continued to be used for passengers until 1915, then it was converted to storage.

=== After railway use ===
The building was leased out as a Christian mission between 1934 and 1940, its last use before demolition that year. Segments of the freight depot were demolished in 1971. The yards were subsequently removed and the site was renovated into the Los Angeles State Historic Park.

== See also ==
- "Not A Cornfield"
- Zanja Madre
