= I (Los Angeles Railway) =

Overview
- Locale: Los Angeles

Service
- Type: Streetcar
- System: Los Angeles Railway

History
- Opened: 1919
- Closed: November 1, 1939

Technical
- Track gauge: 3 ft 6 in (1,067 mm)
- Electrification: Overhead line, 600 V DC

I was a streetcar route in Los Angeles, California. It was owned and operated by the Los Angeles Railway.

== History ==
The route was created from a former section of the West 1st and West 6th Street Line in 1919. It ran from 2nd and San Pedro to Alvarado and West 6th, mainly on West 1st Street. In the rerouting scheme of 1920, the route was shortened to 2nd and Broadway at the eastern end. It was given the letter designation I in 1921. Further rounds of truncation occurred between 1921 and 1932, usually related to road works. These left the outbound terminal at Bonnie Brae Street, where passengers could connect to a D car. Service ceased after November 1, 1939.

== See also ==
- Streetcars in Los Angeles
