= 3 (Los Angeles Railway) =

Former lines of the Los Angeles Railway

3 was the number assigned to two distinct streetcar lines operated by the Los Angeles Railway in Los Angeles, California. Combined, they operated from 1924 to 1947.

== 1924 alignment ==
3

Overview
- Locale: Los Angeles
- Termini: Adams Boulevard and Alsace Avenue; Lincoln Park Avenue and Eastlake Park

Service
- Type: Streetcar
- System: Los Angeles Railway

History
- Opened: 1924
- Closed: 1930

Technical
- Track gauge: 3 ft 6 in (1,067 mm)
- Electrification: Overhead line, 600 V DC

The first version of 3 was introduced in 1924, and was coterminous with the original A line. From a terminus at Adams Boulevard and Alsace Avenue, it ran via Adams Boulevard, Normandie Avenue, 24th Street, Hoover Street, Burlington Avenue, Venice Boulevard, Hill Street, First Street, Broadway, and Lincoln Park Avenue to Eastlake Park. This route was discontinued in 1930.

== 1931 alignment ==
3

Overview
- Locale: Los Angeles
- Termini: Larchmont Boulevard and Melrose Avenue; Central Station

Service
- Type: Streetcar
- System: Los Angeles Railway

History
- Opened: November 1, 1931
- Closed: August 3, 1947

Technical
- Track gauge: 3 ft 6 in (1,067 mm)
- Electrification: Overhead line, 600 V DC

Following much of the original route of the R Line, the new route 3 was drastically different. It is notable for its close parallels to Wilshire Boulevard, which never had a transit line of its own because auto traffic was too heavy. The new 3 ran from the intersection of Larchmont Boulevard and Melrose Avenue to Central Station, by way of Larchmont Boulevard (forming the backbone of the Larchmont neighborhood), 3rd Street, a private right of way running between Gramercy Place and Wilton Place, 6th Street, and 5th Street. From the start of this routing until 1935, short turns were made from 5th to 3rd and were designated as the 4 Line (distinct from that number's 1939 incarnation). The route was converted to trolley bus operation in 1947, eight years after Central Station closed.

The trackless line was extended to 3rd Street and Fairfax Avenue in September 1950.

=== Trolley coach and bus conversion ===
The service was maintained and transferred to Los Angeles Metropolitan Transit Authority in 1958. The agency replaced trolley buses with SilverLiner coaches after March 31, 1963; the new service retained the number 3.
