= Lincoln Boulevard (Los Angeles County) =

Street in Los Angeles, California

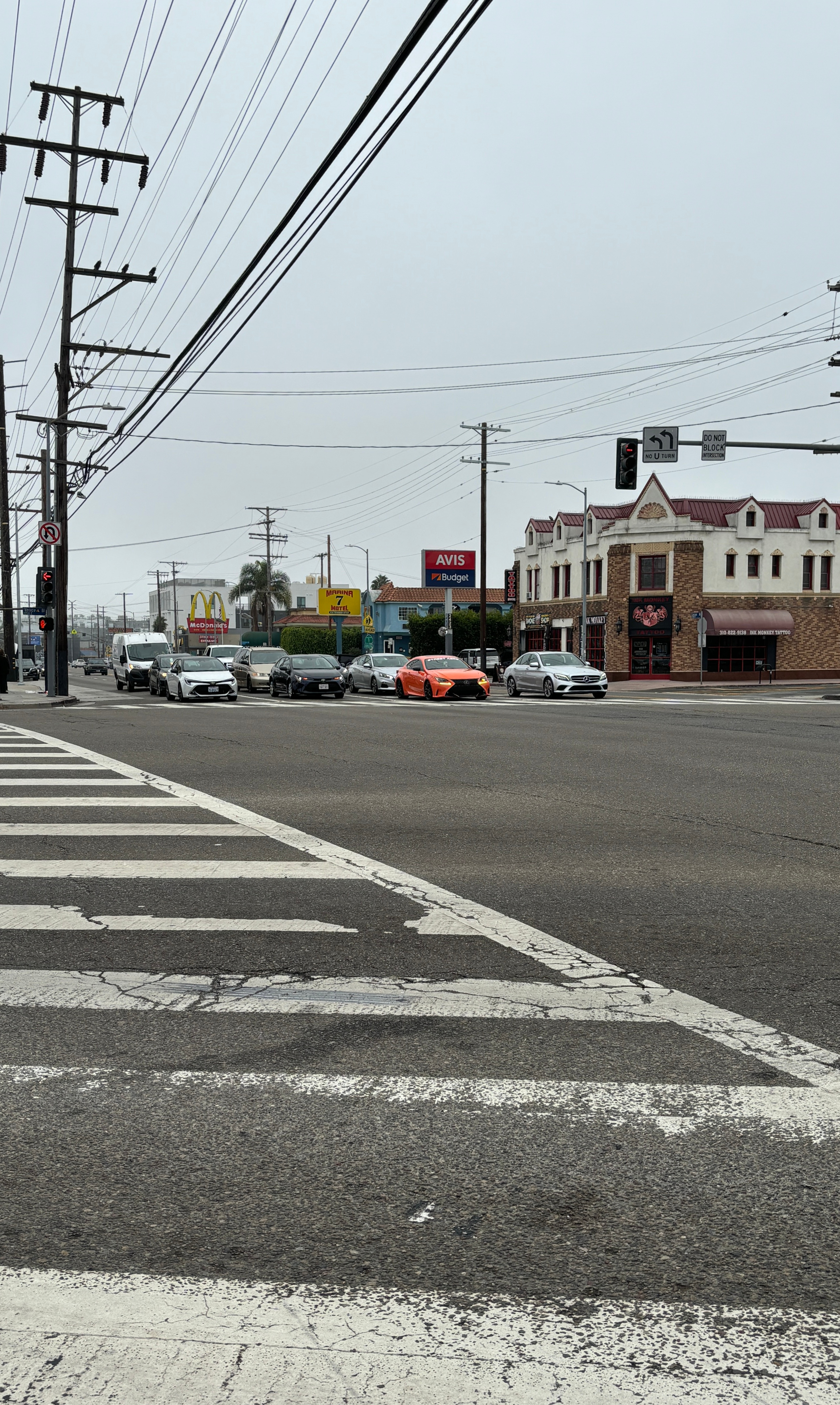
- Lincoln Boulevard at Venice Boulevard in Venice, Los Angeles, October 2024
- Part of: SR 1 between Sepulveda Boulevard at LAX and Interstate 10 (I-10) in Santa Monica
- Maintained by: Caltrans; LACDPW; Local city jurisdictions
- Length: 8.8 mi (14.2 km)
- South end: SR 1 / Sepulveda Boulevard in Los Angeles
- Major junctions: I-10 in Santa Monica
- North end: San Vicente Boulevard in Santa Monica

Lincoln Boulevard is a major northwest–southeast boulevard near Santa Monica Bay in Los Angeles County in California. Over 8 miles (13 km) in length, it connects Los Angeles International Airport (LAX) with Santa Monica. A portion of Lincoln Boulevard is signed as part of California State Route 1 (Pacific Coast Highway), making it a major route to go along the Pacific Coast in Los Angeles.

== Route ==
Lincoln Boulevard begins by branching northwest from Sepulveda Boulevard at the northern side of Los Angeles International Airport (LAX). It then passes through the Los Angeles districts of Westchester, Playa Vista, and Venice before entering Santa Monica. After crossing Wilshire Boulevard, it then changes from a four-lane thoroughfare to a residential street before terminating at San Vicente Boulevard.

Major landmarks include Loyola Marymount University, Otis College of Art and Design, and the Ballona Wetlands.

Lincoln is known for high levels of auto traffic during daylight and rush hours. This congestion creates other high levels of traffic on alternate parallel residential streets, such as Walgrove Avenue in Venice.

=== Signage ===
The portion between its southern terminus at Sepulveda Boulevard and the Santa Monica Freeway (Interstate 10) is signed as part of State Route 1. To the north, Route 1 continues as Pacific Coast Highway. To the south, Route 1 continues as Sepulveda Boulevard. The portion between Interstate 10 and the Santa Monica Boulevard was originally part of State Route 2.

== Rapid transit ==
Santa Monica Transit line 3 operates on Lincoln Boulevard.

== Junction list ==
The entire route is in Los Angeles County.

| Location | mi | km | Destinations | Notes |
|---|---|---|---|---|
| Los Angeles | 0.0 | 0.0 | SR 1 south (Sepulveda Boulevard) | Southern terminus of Lincoln Boulevard; southern end of SR 1 concurrency; no southbound left turn |
| Los Angeles | 0.8 | 1.3 | Westchester Parkway | Interchange |
| Los Angeles | 1.6 | 2.6 | Manchester Avenue | Former western end of SR 42 |
| Los Angeles | 2.1 | 3.4 | Loyola Marymount University Drive | Access to Loyola Marymount University |
| Los Angeles | 2.7 | 4.3 | Jefferson Boulevard | |
| Los Angeles–Marina Del Rey line | 2.9 | 4.7 | Crossing over Ballona Creek | |
| Los Angeles–Marina Del Rey line | 3.0 | 4.8 | Culver Boulevard | Single-quadrant interchange |
| Los Angeles | 3.8 | 6.1 | SR 90 east (Marina Freeway) | Western terminus of SR 90 |
| Los Angeles | 4.3 | 6.9 | Washington Boulevard | |
| Los Angeles | 4.7 | 7.6 | Venice Boulevard (SR 187) | |
| Santa Monica | 6.9 | 11.1 | Pico Boulevard | |
| Santa Monica | 7.1 | 11.4 | I-10 east – Los Angeles SR 1 north – Oxnard; Olympic Boulevard; Western terminus of Historic US 66 | Northern end of SR 1 concurrency; southern end of Historic US 66 concurrency; I-10 east exit 1A, west exit 1B; former western end of SR 2 |
| Santa Monica | 7.5 | 12.1 | Historic US 66 east (Santa Monica Boulevard) | Northern end of Historic US 66 concurrency; former SR 2 |
| Santa Monica | 7.8 | 12.6 | Wilshire Boulevard | |
| Santa Monica | 8.8 | 14.2 | San Vicente Boulevard | Northern terminus of Lincoln Boulevard |
1.000 mi = 1.609 km; 1.000 km = 0.621 mi
