= P (Los Angeles Railway) =

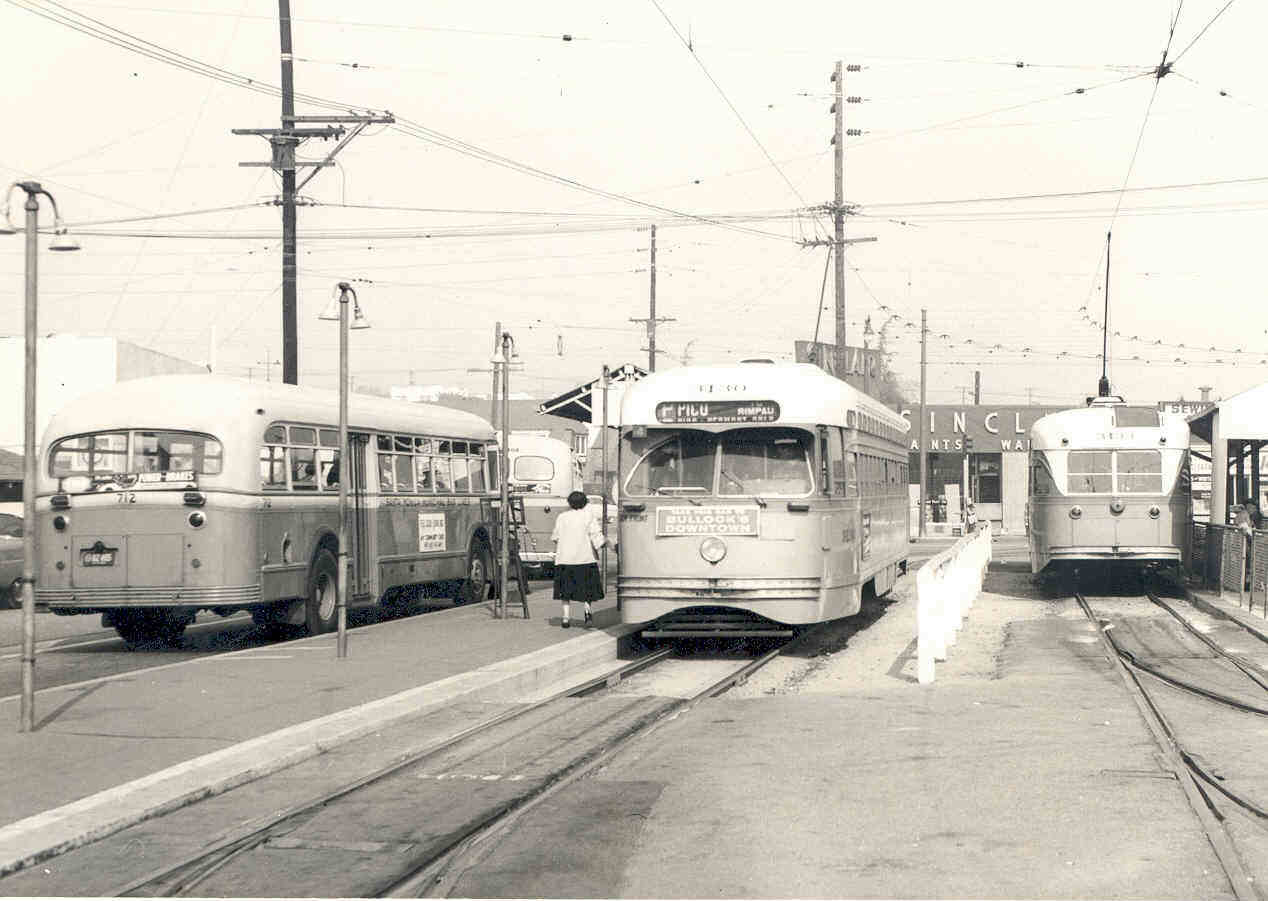
- P cars and buses at the Rimpau Loop terminus, 1956

Overview
- Owner: Los Angeles Metropolitan Transit Authority
- Locale: Los Angeles, East Los Angeles
- Termini: Pico and Rimpau boulevards; Brooklyn Avenue and Rowan Avenue
- Stations: 34

Service
- Type: Streetcar
- System: Los Angeles Railway, Los Angeles Metropolitan Transit Authority

History
- Opened: May 9, 1920
- Closed: March 31, 1963

Technical
- Track gauge: 3 ft 6 in (1,067 mm)
- Electrification: Overhead line, 600 V DC

P was a streetcar line in Los Angeles, California, United States. It was operated by the Los Angeles Railway from 1895 to 1958, and by the Los Angeles Metropolitan Transit Authority from 1958 to 1963.

== History ==
=== Pico Street Electric Railway (1887–90) ===
The first streetcar line on Pico Boulevard was short lived, running from an orange grove at Lorde Street (present-day Harvard Boulevard) to the Plaza de Los Angeles by way of Pico, Maple Avenue, 7th Street, San Julian Street, 3rd Street, and Los Angeles Street. The company began running cars in January 1887 as the first electrified streetcar in the western United States, but went under within a few years.

=== The modern route ===
The Pico and First Street Line was one of the first routes built by the new Los Angeles Railway in 1895. Its route lay between Pico and Van Ness Avenue on the west and Brooklyn and Rowan avenues on the east, via Pico Boulevard, Main Street, Broadway, 1st Street, and Rowan Avenue. In 1919, Broadway was extended south from 11th and Main to Pico Boulevard, removing the line from Main Street entirely.

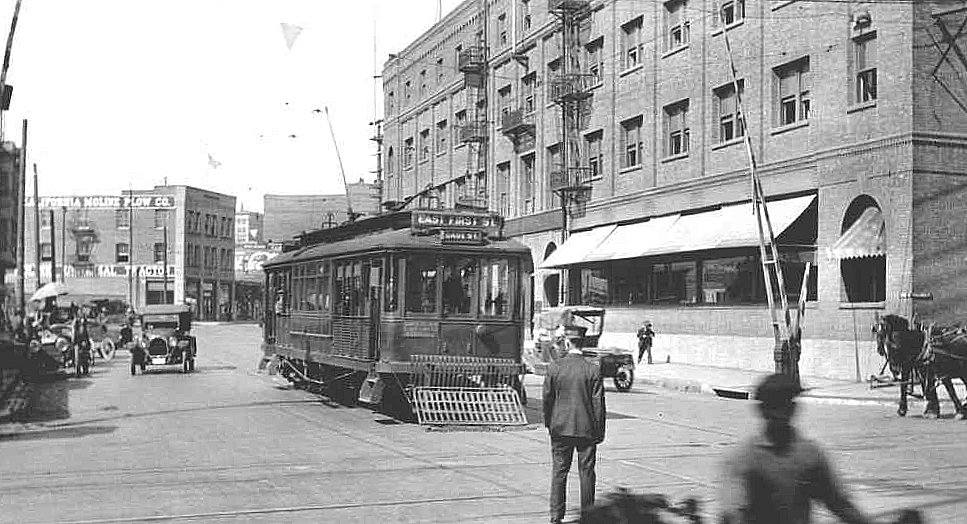
A trolley crosses Alameda Street at 1st Street in Little Tokyo as it heads for Boyle Heights, c. 1918.

In the 1920 service rerouting, the western end of the West Pico and Santa Fe Station Line was combined with the eastern portion of the Boyle Heights and West 7th Street Line to form the West Pico & East First Street Line. The new line ran from Brooklyn and Rowan via Rowan, First, Broadway, and Pico to Delaware. It was assigned the letter designation P in 1921. While the route was unchanged for the rest of its existence, the Rimpau Loop and Dozier loop were added in 1935 and 1936, respectively.

The line was commuted to the Los Angeles Metropolitan Transit Authority in 1958. Service was converted to motor coach operation on March 31, 1963.

== Gage Street Shuttle Line ==
As part of the Los Angeles Railway's expansion, a shuttle line was built north from Rowan and Dozier along Rowan, Hammel and Gage to Blanchard Street, at the foot of what is now City Terrace. This service was designated as route 34. Ridership was very low and the route was discontinued by LATL.

== Rolling stock ==
In 1947, Los Angeles Railway purchased 40 PCC streetcars to replace the old rolling stock on the line.

== Partial restoration ==
The Gold Line Eastside Extension was a project by the Los Angeles County Metropolitan Transportation Authority (successor to LARy services) to establish a light rail line to East Los Angeles. From the previous terminus at Union Station, trains operate primarily via 1st Street to Indiana, though the majority of the line is in a tunnel.

== See also ==
- Streetcars in Los Angeles
