= Venice Boulevard =

Thoroughfare in Los Angeles

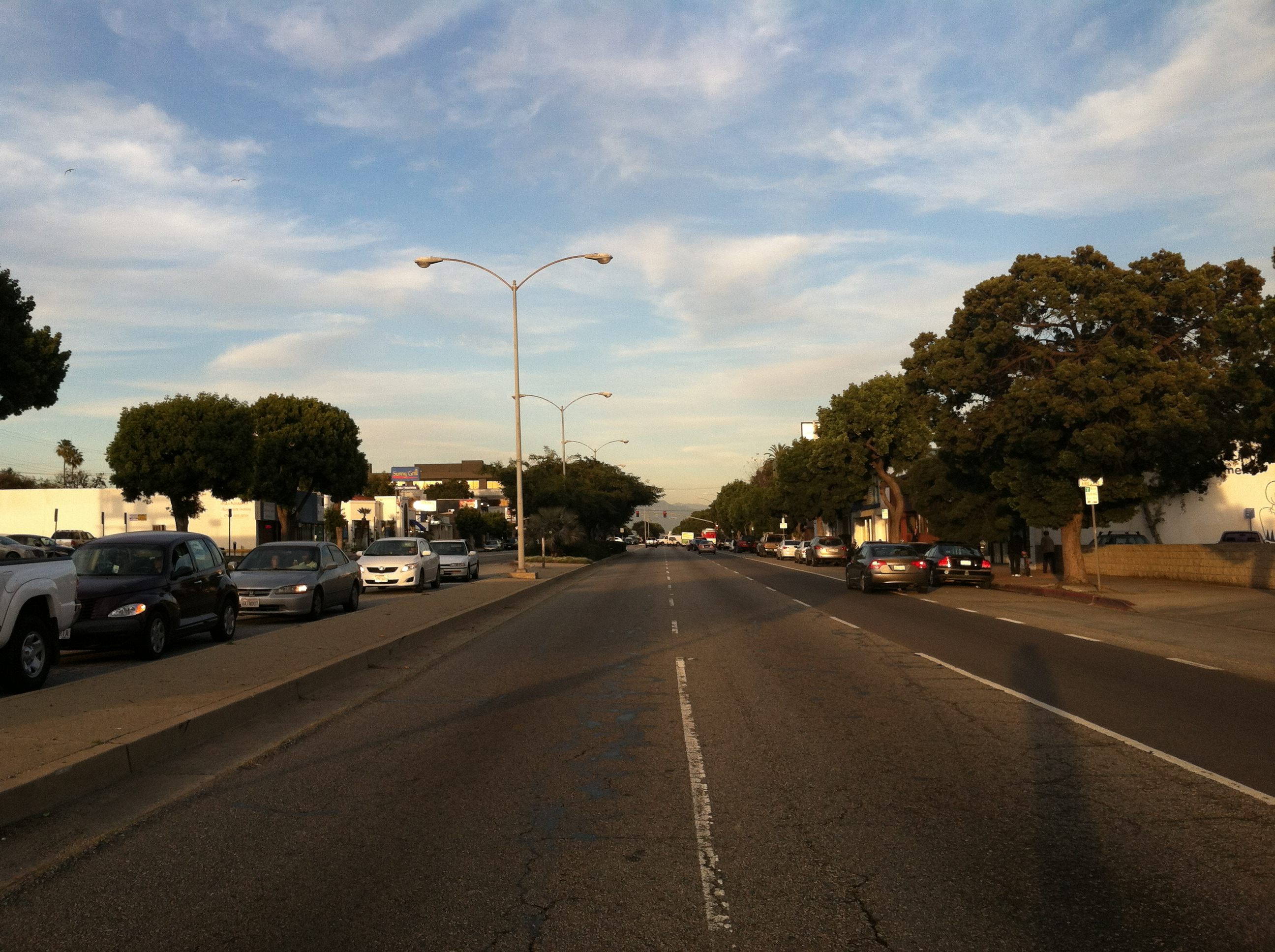
- Venice Boulevard in Mar Vista
- Interactive map of Venice Boulevard
- Former name: West 16th Street
- Maintained by: Caltrans, LACDPW, and the City of Los Angeles
- Location: Los Angeles, California, United States
- Nearest metro station: Culver City
- West end: Ocean Front Walk in Venice
- Major junctions: SR 1 in Venice; I-405 near Culver City; I-10 near Culver City
- East end: Main Street in Downtown

Venice Boulevard is a major east–west thoroughfare in Los Angeles, running from the ocean in the Venice district into downtown Los Angeles. It was originally known as West 16th Street under the Los Angeles numbered street system. While some maps and signs may mark a segment of Venice Boulevard as State Route 187 between Lincoln Boulevard (State Route 1) in Venice and the Santa Monica Freeway (Interstate 10) in the South Robertson district, control of that highway have been relinquished in piecemeal segments from the state to the City of Los Angeles since 2015, with the goal of eventually decommissioning SR 187.

== Route description ==
The western terminus of Venice Boulevard is Ocean Front Walk (a pedestrian road) in Venice. Between Ocean Front Walk and Abbot Kinney Boulevard, a one-way pair is used where eastbound traffic splits onto South Venice Boulevard and westbound traffic travels on North Venice Boulevard. Proceeding easterly, Venice Boulevard crosses Lincoln Boulevard (State Route 1). The route then passes through the Mar Vista neighborhood, intersecting with the San Diego Freeway. Further east, it briefly forms the boundary between the Palms neighborhood and Culver City, passing near Sony Pictures Studios. Venice Boulevard then continues northeast into the Crestview neighborhood of the South Robertson district, intersecting with the Santa Monica Freeway. Continuing to parallel Washington Boulevard directly to its south, as it does for much of its length, Venice Boulevard proceeds between the Picfair Village neighborhood in West Los Angeles and Lafayette Square in Mid-City, through the Mid-Wilshire district, through Arlington Heights, and Harvard Heights. It then dips under the Harbor Freeway (without any direct connection to it), and continues into the heart of downtown Los Angeles, where it turns into East 16th Street at Main Street.

== History ==
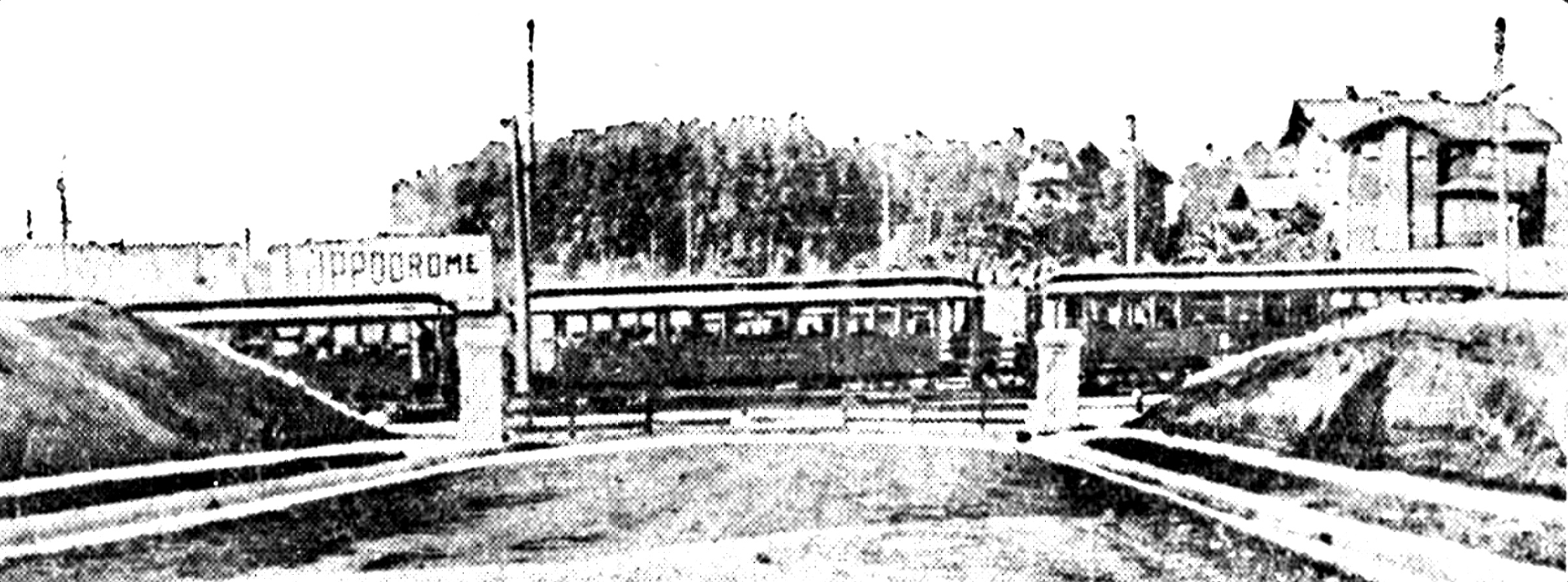
A proposed level crossing at the Pacific Electric tracks (today's Venice Boulevard) would result in "the worse death trap in Los Angeles," a traffic engineer warned in 1915, because of the impaired view of the railway from West Boulevard on both sides. A viaduct was built instead, in 1920.

A street railway was built on 16th Street by the Los Angeles Traction Company in 1896. An extra rail was installed in 1905, which created a dual-gauge streetcar thoroughfare which was shared with the Los Angeles Railway. The line eventually came under the control of the Pacific Electric Railway, which operated it until the end of 1950. The Venice Boulevard Local ran regular service to Vineyard Junction, while the Venice Short Line ran the length of Venice Boulevard from Pacific Avenue to Hill Street. The narrow gauge Los Angeles Railway A Line ran on Venice between Hill and Burlington Avenue until 1946.

Prior to 1932, West 16th Street ended at Crenshaw Boulevard. In that year part of the Pacific Electric right of way was taken and Venice Boulevard was cut through from La Brea Avenue to Crenshaw. At that time West 16th Street was renamed Venice Boulevard.

Venice Boulevard, along with the segment of Pacific Avenue heading north into Santa Monica, became part of what was State Route 163 in 1961. This was redefined as SR 187 in the 1964 state highway renumbering. In 1988, the part of SR 187 in Santa Monica was removed from the state highway system. The part of the route from the southern boundary of Santa Monica to Lincoln Boulevard was then removed in 1994. The California State Legislature later amending the California Streets and Highways Code in 2015 to allow the state to completely remove the entire length of the highway. Segments have since been relinquished in piecemeal segments to the City of Los Angeles; once these segments are also relinquished, the state highway will cease to exist.

== Public transportation ==
Metro Local line 33 operates on Venice Boulevard. The Metro E Line serves a rail station at its intersection with Robertson Boulevard.

== Landmarks ==
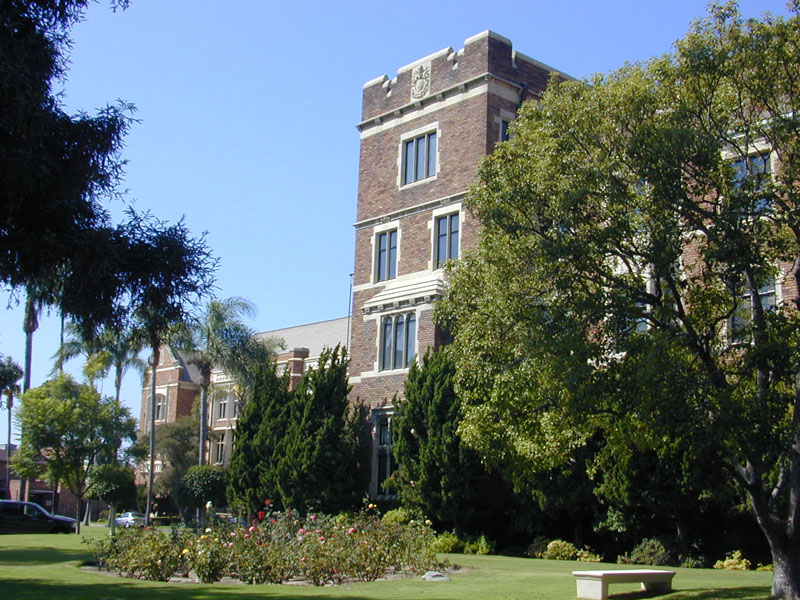
Loyola High School fronting Venice Boulevard

- Venice High School is located near the intersection with Walgrove Avenue.
- Loyola High School is located by Venice and Vermont Avenue.
- The Angelus-Rosedale Cemetery also lies on Venice.

== Major intersections ==
The entire route is in Los Angeles.

mi	km	Destinations	Notes
0.0	0.0	Ocean Front Walk	Pedestrian road; western terminus of Venice Boulevard; west end of one-way pair where eastbound traffic splits onto South Venice Boulevard and westbound traffic joins North Venice Boulevard.
0.6	0.97	Abbot Kinney Boulevard	East end of one-way pair where westbound traffic splits onto North Venice Boulevard and eastbound traffic joins from South Venice Boulevard
1.3	2.1	SR 1 (Lincoln Boulevard)	
2.5	4.0	Centinela Avenue	
3.5– 3.7	5.6– 6.0	I-405 (San Diego Freeway) / Sawtelle Boulevard / Sepulveda Boulevard – Long Beach, Santa Monica	I-405 exit 52
5.4	8.7	Culver Boulevard	
5.6	9.0	Robertson Boulevard	Connects to I-10 west
5.7	9.2	National Boulevard	Connects to I-10 east
6.4– 6.6	10.3– 10.6	I-10 (Santa Monica Freeway) / La Cienega Boulevard	I-10 exit 7A
7.0	11.3	Fairfax Avenue	
8.5	13.7	La Brea Avenue	
9.0	14.5	San Vicente Boulevard	
9.5	15.3	Crenshaw Boulevard	
10.6	17.1	Western Avenue	
11.6	18.7	Vermont Avenue	
13.0	20.9	Figueroa Street	
13.2	21.2	Grand Avenue	
13.3	21.4	Hill Street	
13.4	21.6	Broadway	
13.5	21.7	Main Street	Eastern terminus of Venice Boulevard
13.5	21.7	East 16th Street	Continuation beyond Main Street
1.000 mi = 1.609 km; 1.000 km = 0.621 mi

== Notable incidents ==
A gasoline pipeline explosion occurred June 16, 1976 on the street with a death of toll seven and twenty-one people with injuries requiring hospitalization.

== See also ==
- Pico/Rimpau
