= A (Los Angeles Railway) =

Historical rail line in Los Angeles, California, United States

Overview
- Locale: Los Angeles

Service
- Type: Streetcar
- System: Los Angeles Railway
- Daily ridership: 14,775 (1940)

History
- Opened: May 9, 1920
- Closed: June 30, 1946

Technical
- Track gauge: 3 ft 6 in (1,067 mm)
- Electrification: Overhead line, 600 V DC

A refers to several streetcar routes in Los Angeles, California. The lines were operated by the Los Angeles Railway and its successor, Los Angeles Transit Lines, from 1920 to 1946.

== History ==
1920–1932

Los Angeles Railway rerouted many lines on May 9, 1920, assigning them letter designations the following year. The A line ran along Adams; Normandie Avenue; 24th; Hoover; Burlington; 16th; Hill; 1st; Spring; North Main; Sunset; North Broadway; Lincoln Park Avenue; looping back via North Main to Plaza; thence to west terminal over above route. In 1924, the lines was split in two and was given numeric designations. The 2 West Adams and North Main Street Line operated on those streets as well as a portion of the former C Griffith and Griffin Avenue Line. The 3 West Adams and Lincoln Park Line also ran on Main Street. In 1926, the A-2 was rerouted to Griffin Park. The two routes were recombined in 1930 as a single A line.

1932–1939

A new A line started service on June 12, 1932. It was formed by the Adams Avenue segment of the former service and the Angeleno Heights segment of the G Griffith and Angeleno Heights Line. A branch at Edgeware Road opened in 1934, and the main service was rerouted on this line starting in 1938.

1939–46

Cars began running through the Hill Street Tunnel in July 1939. The final and longest lived routing of the A began service on September 25, 1939. It was predominantly formed from the old A line as well as Temple Street taken from the L West 11th and West Temple Street Line. Tracks on Fountain were removed from service in 1942, and the line ceased to operate on June 30, 1946.

== See also ==
- Streetcars in Los Angeles
