= G (Los Angeles Railway) =

Several streetcar routes in Los Angeles, CA

Overview
- Locale: Los Angeles

Service
- Type: Streetcar
- System: Los Angeles Railway

History
- Opened: 1910
- Closed: June 30, 1946

Technical
- Track gauge: 3 ft 6 in (1,067 mm)
- Electrification: Overhead line, 600 V DC

G refers to several streetcar routes in Los Angeles, California that ran via Griffith Avenue. The lines were operated by the Los Angeles Railway from 1910 to 1946.

== History ==
The Griffith Avenue streetcar line opened on November 1, 1905, running from Temple Square via Main, 12th, Stanford, 14th, and Griffith. The line was combined with the Griffin Avenue line in 1910. The new service ran from Vernon and McKinley to Griffin and Montecito. It was briefly extended to Seville Avenue and Santa Ana Street in the south from 1919 to 1920, but was reverted to its original terminus. The line was given the designation G in 1921.

The G line followed the same route through to Griffin until 1926 when that segment of track was taken over by the A-2 line. The Angeleno Heights Shuttle Line was absorbed into the service and served as the G's new north end. The following year the Edgeware Road and Douglas Avenue sections were transferred to the C line and the terminus cut back to Bellevue Avenue and Edgeware Road. By 1930 the terminus was again cut back to Sunset and Beaudry.

In 1932 the northern section was again changed, with the Angeleno Heights segment of tracks transferred to the A line. The new route operated from Vernon and McKinley Avenues to Spring and Ord Streets via McKinley, 14th, Stanford, 12th, Main, Sunset, and Spring.

The line ceased running through Downtown after February 1938, operating as a shuttle service on the south side from 12th and Stanford to Vernon and McKinley. Streetcar service ended on June 30, 1946.

== See also ==
- Streetcars in Los Angeles
