= Catalina Dock Line =

Los Angeles transit line (1920–1958)

Catalina Dock

Overview
- Line number: 8
- Locale: Los Angeles County, California
- Termini: Los Angeles; Catalina Dock Terminal Island (1942–1945)

Service
- Type: Interurban
- System: Pacific Electric
- Operator(s): Pacific Electric (1920–1953) Metropolitan Coach Lines (1953–1957) Los Angeles Metropolitan Transit Authority (1958)

Technical
- Track gauge: 1,435 mm (4 ft 8 1/2 in) standard gauge
- Electrification: Overhead line, 600 V DC

The Catalina Dock Line is a former Pacific Electric interurban railway line in Los Angeles County, California. The service began primarily for holiday travel but was expanded to serve dock workers during World War II. It ran between Downtown Los Angeles and Terminal Island.

== History ==
While the San Pedro via Dominguez Line had previously served Catalina Island steamships, the establishment of a new terminal at Wilmington necessitated a new service. The Catalina Dock Line opened in March 1920 along with the dock. Service was largely seasonal, with a single daily round trip most of the year, increased to several Los Angeles departures in the summer months. A separate service to Long Beach began in February 1928. Direct independent service from Pasadena was provided during the 1930 and 1931 summer seasons.

Catalina Dock Line service was discontinued on December 23, 1941. However the company soon found it necessary to transport shipbuilders to the California Shipbuilding Corporation yard on Terminal Island. The Terminal Island Line began operating over the same route as the former Catalina Dock Line on February 4, 1942 along with a new service from Long Beach. The Terminal Island railway was hastily constructed later that year, opening the following March to eliminate the ferry transfer to the island. The service had ceased by September 13, 1945, having fulfilled its wartime role (the Long Beach trip lasted a few more days). The Terminal Island Railway was removed.

Pre-war service was restored on March 6, 1946, returning to a single round trip to Catalina Dock with seasonal increases and a Long Beach trip. The Long Beach run was discontinued after April 29, 1949. The service was commuted to Metropolitan Coach Lines on October 1, 1953. Regular service was discontinued after Halloween 1955, but the line continued to see use in the summer. The final season of 1958 would see the line operated by the Los Angeles Metropolitan Transit Authority, with the last train running October 12.
