= C (Los Angeles Railway) =

Streetcar route (1910–1932)

Overview
- Locale: Los Angeles

Service
- Type: Streetcar
- System: Los Angeles Railway

History
- Opened: 1910
- Closed: June 12, 1932

Technical
- Track gauge: 3 ft 6 in (1,067 mm)
- Electrification: Overhead line, 600 V DC

C refers to two streetcar routes in Los Angeles, California. The lines were operated by the Los Angeles Railway from 1910 to 1932.

== History ==
=== Angeleno Heights and Crown Hill (1910–1923) ===
The beginnings of the route begin in 1910 when the Los Angeles Railway acquired the Angeleno Heights and Crown Hill Lines from the Los Angeles Inter-Urban Electric Railway, combining them into one service. It operated on a winding circle route in and north of Downtown Los Angeles with a branch to Kensington Road and Douglas Street – cars terminated at their second stop at Bellevue Avenue and East Edgeware Road. Rebuilding of the Broadway Tunnel forced the line to be rerouted there in 1915. Under the new naming scheme adopted in 1921, the line was designated the letter C. The route operated from Douglas Street and Kensington Road via Douglas to Edgeware; Bellevue; Beaudry; Alpine; Figueroa; Boston; Bunker Hill; California; Hill; Temple; North Broadway; 1st; Hill; 5th; Olive; 6th; Flower; 3rd; Boylston; Crown Hill; Columbia; 2nd; Loma Drive; and Belmont as far as Temple. Track on the Echo Park Line was abandoned later in the year and the circle was broken, with a cars terminating at Temple Street and Belmont Avenue.

=== Temple Street Line (1910–1924) ===
Acquired from the Pacific Electric in 1910, the Temple Street Line ran From East 1st Street and San Pedro Street to Fountain Avenue and Edgemont primarily on 1st and Temple Streets. The service was designated as the T line in 1921.

=== Crown Hill and Temple Street (1923–1932) ===
The T line was absorbed into a new C line, starting in November 1923 with the west end of the route with full integration the following year. The service formed a new circle route, starting and running through Bellevue Avenue and East Edgeware Road to a branch into East Hollywood. The line was straightened downtown via 5th Street after October 1925. In 1927, the Kensington Road and Douglas Street of Temple was transferred to the G. Service was rerouted downtown to rebuild the lines for eight months starting in 1931.

In 1932, the former Edgeware line became a shuttle service and was designated line 32. The C was discontinued on June 12, 1932, with portions of the line being transferred to the 2 and L.

== See also ==
- Streetcars in Los Angeles
