= Sierra Vista Line =

Pacific Electric streetcar line (1895–1951)

Sierra Vista

Overview
- Owner: Southern Pacific Railroad
- Locale: Southern California
- Termini: Pacific Electric Building, Downtown Los Angeles; Sierra Vista, El Sereno, Eastside Los Angeles

Service
- Type: Streetcar
- System: Pacific Electric
- Operator(s): Pacific Electric

History
- Opened: May 6, 1895; 130 years ago
- Closed: September 30, 1951; 73 years ago

Technical
- Line length: 7.65 mi (12.31 km)
- Track gauge: 1,435 mm (4 ft 8 1/2 in) standard gauge
- Electrification: Overhead line, 600 V DC

The Sierra Vista Line was a streetcar route mostly operated by the Pacific Electric Railway. It ran from 1895 to 1951 as the short turn making local stops along the Pasadena Short Line on the outside tracks of the Northern Division quadruple-track system.

== Route ==
The line ran from Downtown Los Angeles to the Sierra Vista Junction, at the corner of Huntington Drive and Main Street in the El Sereno community of Eastside Los Angeles.

== History ==
The route began as a horsecar line. In 1894, the Pasadena & Los Angeles Electric Railway purchased, re-gauged, electrified, and double-tracked a section of the line for streetcar use. Service began on May 6, 1895. Pacific Electric acquired the route in 1898, and the line was again rebuilt to standard gauge. Upon opening on November 11, 1902, service ran between the Raymond Hotel and the junction with the Alhambra Line. Negotiations to cross the existing roads — the Santa Fe Railway, Terminal Railway, and California Cycleway — led Pacific Electric to build a bridge over the right of ways shortly after their service commenced. In 1908, double tracking was completed throughout.

Between 1912 and 1914, the inbound terminus was moved to Ceres and Central in the rear of Southern Pacific's Arcade Depot. Starting August 1915, local services on the line were assumed by interurban runs. Independent service was reestablished in December 1916, instead terminating at the elevated concourse at the Pacific Electric Building. Alhambra–San Gabriel Line cars absorbed local services again between November 1918 and February 1920. The Sierra Vista Line operated exclusively in Pacific Electric's Northern District until 1938. Beginning March 20 of that year, the service was multiplexed with the Southern District Watts Line. The Aliso Street bridge opened in 1943, eliminating grade crossings with the Union Pacific and Santa Fe Railroad. From 1943 to 1948, local service was extended over the Short Line past Sierra Vista as far as Pasadena. Passenger volumes during World War II additionally necessitated cars terminating downtown to run via a loop on San Pedro, 6th, and Main streets.

Through-routing with the Watts Line virtually ended on October 22, 1950, with the franchise run discontinued on December 28. Service ended on September 30, 1951.
