= Venice Boulevard gas pipeline explosion =

1976 explosion in Venice Boulevard, US

A gasoline pipeline explosion occurred June 16, 1976 on Venice Boulevard, Los Angeles, California, United States. The death toll was seven with twenty-one people with injuries requiring hospitalization.

== Background ==
In September 1975, the California Department of Transportation (Caltrans) contracted with the Griffith Company for a street widening project on the west side of Los Angeles. The stretch of road being widened was on Venice Boulevard between Keystone and Cadillac Avenues. This portion of Venice was separated by a wide median which was to be excavated, filled with crushed stone, and then paved to accommodate additional traffic. Griffith had made use of subcontractors, including C.W. Poss, Inc., which was performing the excavation. At the time of the incident, the project was 41% complete and had been running for nine months.

== Explosion ==
At 10:32am on June 16, 1976, a workman operating a skip loader in the median near the intersection of Venice Boulevard and Bagley Avenue struck an 8 inches (200 mm) gas pipeline owned by Standard Oil Company of California (now Chevron Corporation). Gasoline under 600 pounds per square inch (4,100 kPa) of pressure sprayed into the air and over the north (westbound) side of the street where it drenched nearby cars and buildings. Although traffic was not heavy at the time, there were automobiles parked at the curb and some were moving on the westbound lanes. Seven two- and three-story buildings were located on this block. People were inside the buildings and pedestrians were passing by on the sidewalk.

Ninety seconds later, the gasoline ignited. The explosion hurled huge fireballs hundreds of feet in the air and flames engulfed the gasoline drenched buildings. All seven buildings on the north side of the 9500 block of Venice and several parked cars were incinerated. One person was burned beyond recognition when flames enveloped his moving vehicle. Witnesses told of seeing women employees run from a drapery shop with hair and clothing on fire. Stanley Steinberg, owner of Armand’s Sewing Machine Co., said the heat was so intense that a telephone and some of the sewing machines melted. On the south side of the street windows were shattered.

== Response ==
The Los Angeles Fire Department received the alarm at 10:34am and the first firefighting equipment arrived on the scene at 10:39am. A Los Angeles Police Department patrol car saw the fire at 10:35am and reported it. The police established a two-block perimeter around the area to control the flow of disrupted traffic. Firefighters applied water on the buildings and foam and chemicals on the gasoline fire at the site of the rupture. At 11:10am a manually operated valve on the pipeline was closed. The gasoline fire at the rupture was under control by 2:00pm. Evacuated residents were able to return to their homes at 4:59pm.

Paramedics at the scene reported two dead and 27 injured. The dead included a 92-year-old woman who fled her home on Bagley Avenue just off Venice and collapsed of a heart attack in her front yard. A dozen ambulances rushed victims to at least three hospitals – County-USC Medical Center, Brotman Memorial Hospital, and the Sherman Oaks Community Burn Center. Twenty-one persons were hospitalized, five of which subsequently died of their injuries, bringing the total death toll to seven.

== Investigation ==
An investigation into the incident was conducted by the National Transportation Safety Board (NTSB). Their report was released on December 9, 1976. It concluded that the probable cause of the accident was the rupture of the pipeline by the excavation equipment, whose operator was unaware of the pipeline’s precise depth and location.

The NTSB report reached the following further conclusions regarding the cause of the accident:

1. while the Standard Oil Company of California (SOCAL) supplied Caltrans with information about the existence of its pipeline, it failed to provide its specific depth and location.
2. No attempt was made to verify the pipeline depth at the accident by the four parties (SOCAL, Caltrans, Griffith, and Poss). Test holes dug by SOCAL were spaced too far apart for an accurate depth determination.
3. No “one-call” system was in effect at the time of the accident.

THE NTSB made a series of recommendations intended to reduce the likelihood of such accidents in the future. One of the most significant was the development of a “one-call” system that required excavators to provide notification to the system 48 hours before digging. Such systems allow the owner of underground facilities to mark the lines they own or maintain, reducing the likelihood of accidents.

== Aftermath ==
The project to widen Venice Boulevard was concluded in the year following the incident, however the scars on the block from the blast were evident for years to come. One year later, 39 lawsuits totaling $33 million had been filed. Named as defendants include the City of Los Angeles, the State of California, Standard Oil Company, and the contractors involved in the project.

The “one-call” system recommended in the NTSB report was adopted for the region. By 1994, 71 individual one-call centers across the United States had been created and received 15 million calls per year. In 2002, the federal government directed the Department of Transportation (DOT) and Federal Communications Commission (FCC) to establish a three-digit, nationwide toll-free number that unified these centers. This is known as the 8-1-1 Call Before you Dig system.
