= Los Angeles & San Pedro Railroad =

Railway line in California, US

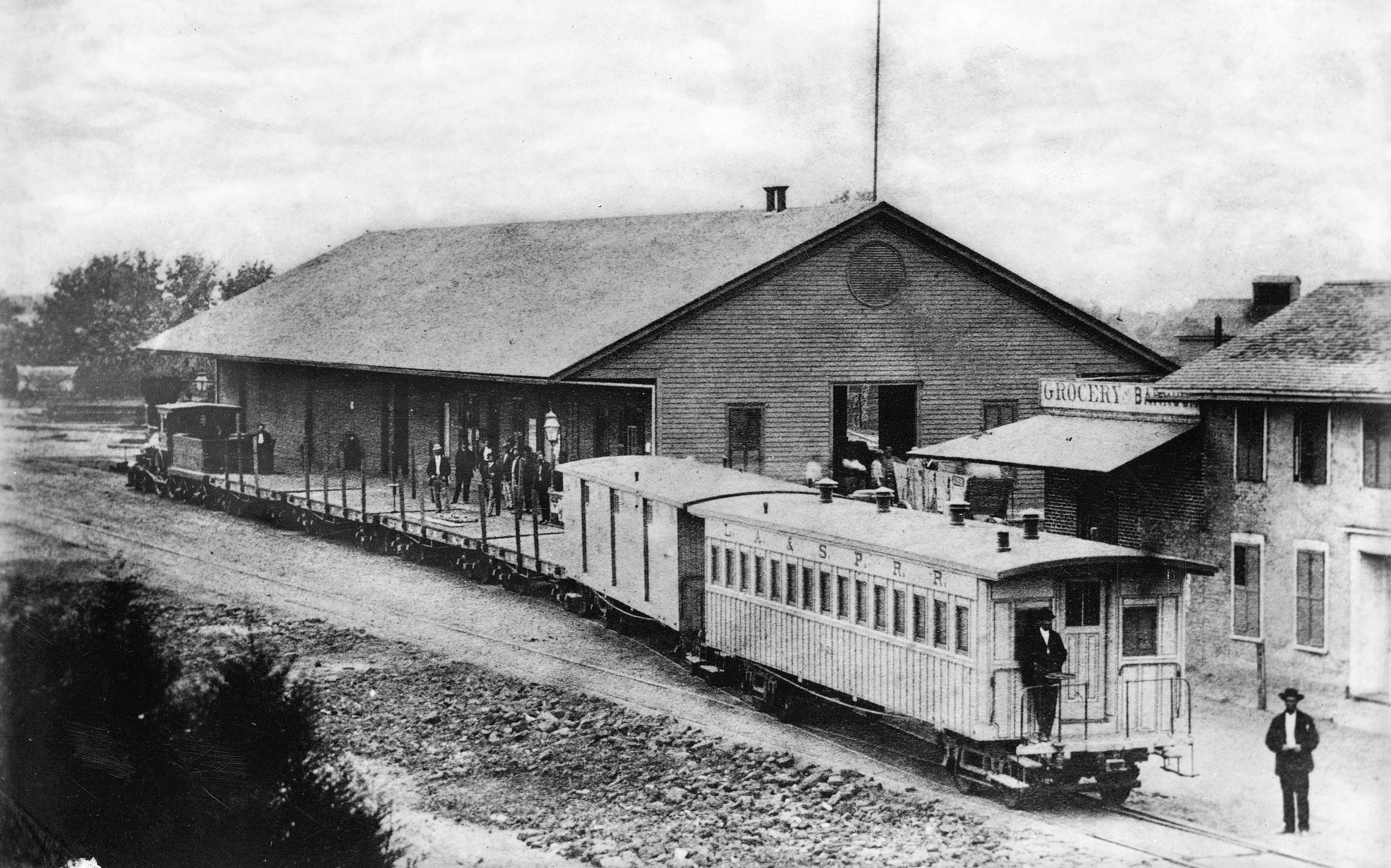
- Los Angeles and San Pedro's Los Angeles station, c. 1880

Overview
- Locale: San Pedro Bay to Los Angeles
- Dates of operation: 1869–1873
- Predecessor: None
- Successor: Southern Pacific

Technical
- Track gauge: 4 ft 8 in (1,422 mm)
- Length: 21 miles (34 km)

The Los Angeles & San Pedro Railroad was Southern California's first railroad. Its 21-mile (34 km) line from San Pedro Bay to Los Angeles was built from 1868 to 1869 and began operations on October 26, 1869. The railroad was the brainchild of Phineas Banning and its primary purpose was to transport freight from the port to the city.

The Los Angeles & San Pedro Railroad was purchased by the Southern Pacific Railroad in 1873. The railroad would go on to be incorporated into the Alameda Corridor, which continues to carry freight trains between Los Angeles and the Port of Los Angeles and Port of Long Beach.

== Securing approvals ==
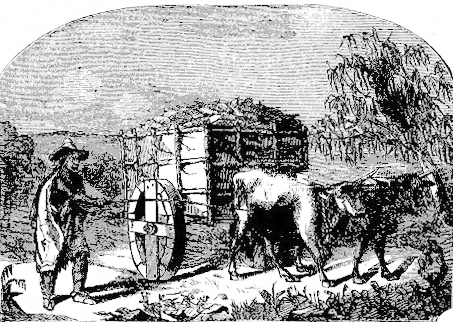
An oxcart transporting cargo along the Paseo de San Pedro

Los Angeles had used the harbor at San Pedro Bay as its principal seaport from the early Spanish days. Though never considered a fine harbor, it was the best harbor between San Diego and Santa Barbara. The first means of transportation between the harbor and Los Angeles were oxcarts, to which were added large, horse-drawn wagons after the American conquest of California.

For some time, businessmen in Los Angeles felt that having a railroad to the bay would be beneficial. As early as 1853, Phineas Banning saw the area around present-day Wilmington both as a possible terminus for a transcontinental railroad, and as a possible seaport.

Numerous plans for a railroad from Los Angeles to the area were discussed in the 1860s, but for one reason or another, nothing was done until Banning was elected a state Senator. After two older, failed attempts to introduce legislation for an LA-to-the-harbor railroad (one by Abel Stearns in 1861 and another by E.J.C. Kewen in 1863), Senator Banning submitted bills in January 1868, regarding such a railroad and these were passed by the state legislature and signed by the governor on February 1, 1868.

The bills authorized the County of Los Angeles to subscribe to $100,000 of the capital stock of the new railroad, and the City of Los Angeles to subscribe to $75,000. One stipulation in the bill was that the city and county could assign the stock of the railroad to a transcontinental railroad if it were to come to Los Angeles. Stock would be sold to the public to raise the remaining $175,000 needed to complete the line.

Two weeks after passage the first stockholders meeting was held. John G. Downey was elected president, and John S. Griffin, M.D., John Kay and Matthew Keller were present. Articles of incorporation were filed February 18, 1868, and the incorporators asked the city and county for an election to approve the railroad subsidy, which was held March 24, 1868. Though there was opposition to the railroad from areas other than the harbor or Los Angeles, including rural areas such as Anaheim, El Monte, Azusa, Ballona, San Fernando and Los Nietos, the subsidy passed in Los Angeles County with a vote of 700 to 672, and in Los Angeles City it passed more decisively with a vote of 347 to 245.

== Construction ==
Phineas Banning initially received the contract for building the railroad, and ground was broken at Wilmington on September 20, 1868. He then contracted the actual construction to H.B. Tichenor, a San Francisco businessman.

The entire right of way from the Los Angeles City limits to Wilmington cost eight dollars, as most of the land was either donated outright or was procured for nominal sums, the owners anticipating benefits from the railroad running through their property. The route chosen followed the San Pedro Road and Alameda Street, and skirted the eastern base of Dominguez Hill, and resulted in Downey withdrawing from the project, as he wanted the route to use the western side of Dominguez Hill, thereby passing through land he owned.

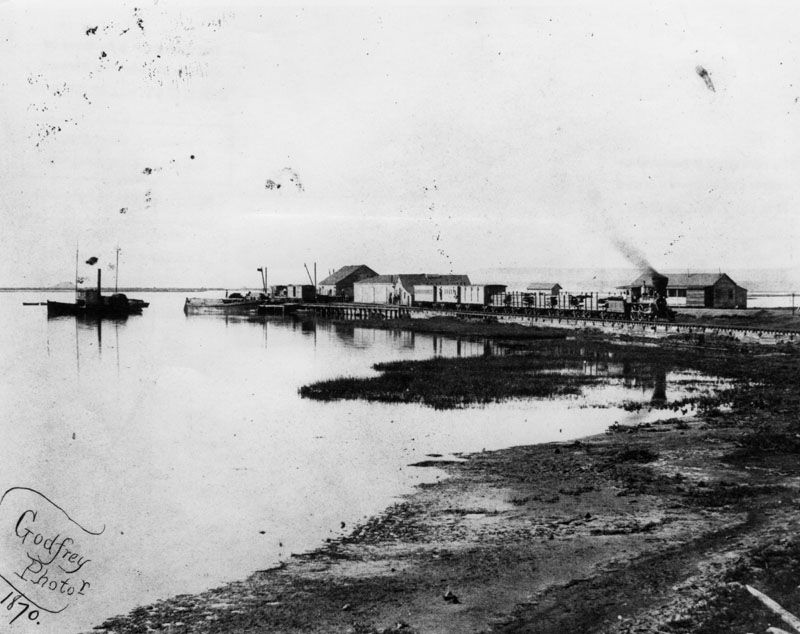
The newly opened port terminal station at Wilmington, 1870

By June 14, 1869 only six miles (9.7 km) of track had been finished, and farmers began to complain, as they anticipated saving on freight charges if they could ship their large grain crop, due to be harvested soon, by railroad. More workers were added and by June 20, another seven miles (11 km) were constructed. By August 19, 18 miles (29 km) had been finished.

In February 1869 a depot site was purchased on the southwest corner of Alameda and Commercial Streets in Los Angeles. The wharf in Wilmington was improved by the addition of a depot, warehouse, a coal shed and the needed right of way.

The first locomotive in Southern California, the "San Gabriel", was put into service when the line opened on October 26, 1869, with an excursion to Wilmington and a grand ball. Regular service commenced on November 1, 1869, with trains leaving Los Angeles at 10 a.m. and 4 p.m., and Wilmington at 8 a.m. and 1 p.m. Passenger fares from Los Angeles to Wilmington were $1.50 (equivalent to $36 in 2025).

== Impact ==
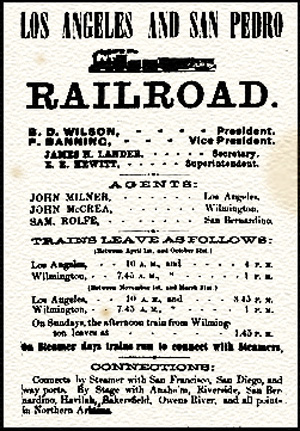
An advertisement for the Los Angeles & San Pedro Railroad

The railroad resulted in reduced fares and freight rates from Los Angeles to Banning's Wilmington wharf, with passenger rates from depot to depot set at $1.50, with an additional $1.00 charge from the wharf to steamers standing offshore, unable to dock in the shallow waters around the dock. Freight rates for the first six months of operation totaled $61,847, an improvement over the $171,988 it would have cost using previous transportation methods.

There were controversies over the construction and financing, and complaints about the southern terminal not being on a deep-water port. Some newspapers criticized the "Railroad Ring" and complained about high freight rates. The city of Los Angeles eventually filed suit against the railroad, a suit that was eventually dropped.

The railroad was a strong stimulant to Los Angeles. Remi Nadeau's shipments of silver and lead from the Cerro Gordo Mines used the line to access the port at Wilmington, which increased coastal freight traffic and made Wilmington a much more active port, allowing it to build new amenities such as the Exchange Hotel and the Railroad Saloon.

The railroad spurred new communities along the route. Florence, a farming community, was created about four miles (6.4 km) south of the Los Angeles depot. Comptonville (later Compton) was founded as Methodist temperance community about six miles (9.7 km) further south. four miles (6.4 km) further was Dominguez Station, which served the needs of the Dominguez family and their ranch. And Cerritos was created two miles (3.2 km) further south as the shipping point for the Cerritos sheep ranch.

In 1871, there were reports that the railroad would be extended to Anaheim, and then through San Bernardino to Arizona or Utah. Congress, responding to requests from Southern California representatives, voted $200,000 for a deep water port on March 2, 1871.

== Acquisition by Southern Pacific ==
In 1872, the Southern Pacific Railroad was building a line south from San Francisco, and Los Angeles was concerned that the main line might bypass the little community entirely, so Harris Newmark and John G. Downey met with Collis P. Huntington about running the line through Los Angeles. Huntington agreed, but insisted on a subsidy which also included the stock of the Los Angeles and San Pedro Railroad, consistent with a state law passed in 1870 which made it possible for cities to pass bond measures of up to 5% of its property value to aid in railroad building. In return, Southern Pacific agreed to build 50 miles (80 km) of lines connecting Los Angeles with other outlying areas, as well as running its main line through the city.

This proposal was well-received by the public. A letter published in the Los Angeles Star favorably compared the $525,000 cost of the subsidy to the approximately $4 million cost of the lines to be built, and the possible appreciation in property values. Only Anaheim, which favored a direct connection to a harbor, was opposed to the suggestion. In July, 1872 there was a meeting about the Southern Pacific's proposition; the city of Los Angeles agreed to donate the stock it held in the Los Angeles and San Pedro R.R. Finally, on November 5, 1872, in a county-wide election, voters decided to accept the Southern Pacific's offer. The final vote was 1,896 For the SP and 724 Against.

The LA&SP was formally transferred to the Southern Pacific on April 23, 1873.

This not only allowed the SP to acquire a money-making railroad, but also gave the company a monopoly of port facilities at Wilmington until that monopoly was broken by the Los Angeles Terminal Railway twenty years later.

== After the Southern Pacific acquisition ==
From this initial beginning, the Southern Pacific built a station at San Fernando Road just north of the city of Los Angeles, called the River Station. It then constructed a 25-mile (40 km) line northward to San Fernando, which would eventually be connected to its line from San Francisco. It also constructed a line 25 miles (40 km) east to Spadra, a community east of Pomona; this line would eventually connect to the Southern Pacific southern route main line. Finally it built a line south east to Anaheim, which opened in January, 1875.

With the completion of the main line to Los Angeles on September 9, 1876, the Southern Pacific Railway had a complete monopoly on Los Angeles rail transportation, in the city area and to the harbor. This would go on to be broken by the arrival of the Atchison, Topeka and Santa Fe Railway to the ports in the 1920s, though the San Pedro Branch remained a vital rail line.

The line would be sold by SP, which was suffering from financial difficulties, to a new county-run transportation authority in 1994. The Alameda Corridor Transportation Authority was tasked to upgrade the old Los Angeles & San Pedro right of way to a grade-separated high-quality freight link, which began service in 2002.

== See also ==
- Bibliography of Los Angeles
- Outline of the history of Los Angeles
- Bibliography of California history
