= Los Angeles Metropolitan Transit Authority =

American government agency from 1951 to 1964

Overview
- Locale: Los Angeles
- Transit type: Streetcar; Interurban; Local bus (including trolleybuses)
- Number of lines: 10 Light rail 2 Trolley bus -- Bus routes
- Number of stations: -- Rail
- Daily ridership: -- (Weekdays)

Operation
- Began operation: July 24, 1951; 75 years ago
- Ended operation: November 5, 1964; 62 years ago
- Operator: Los Angeles Metropolitan Transit Authority

Technical
- System length: Rail – 0 miles (0 km); Bus – 0 miles (0 km)
- Track gauge: 4 ft 8 1/2 in (1,435 mm) standard gauge 3 ft 6 in (1,067 mm) narrow gauge
- Electrification: 600 V direct current

The Los Angeles Metropolitan Transit Authority (sometimes referred to as LAMTA or MTA I) was a public agency formed on July 24, 1951. Originally tasked with planning for rapid transit in Los Angeles, California, the agency would come to operate the vestiges of defunct private transit companies in the city.

== History ==
Formed in 1951, LAMTA's original mandate was to do a feasibility study for a monorail line which would have connected Long Beach with the Panorama City district in the San Fernando Valley via Downtown Los Angeles.

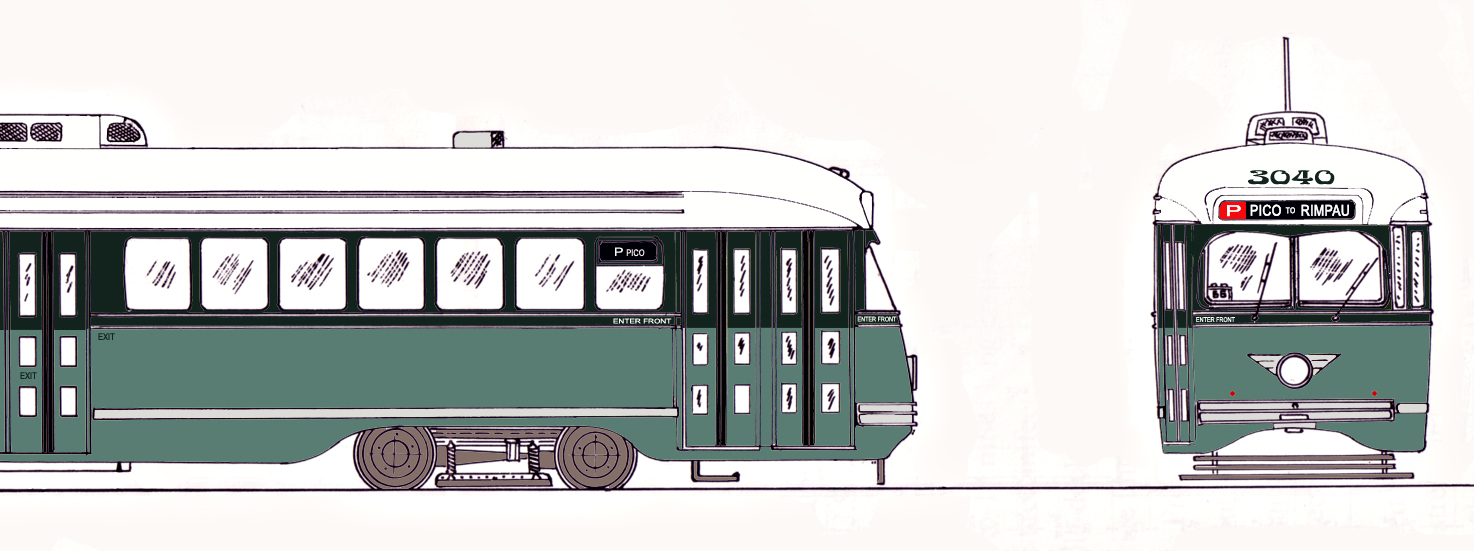
Streetcar livery under LAMTA

The agency's powers were expanded in 1954, authorizing it to study and propose an extensive regional transit system. In 1957, another expansion of the agency's powers authorized it to operate transit lines, and it subsequently purchased the bus and streetcar lines then being operated by Metropolitan Coach Lines, which had taken over passenger service of the Pacific Electric Railway in 1953, as well as the bus and streetcar lines of the Los Angeles Transit Lines, successor to the Los Angeles Railway. Both companies, as well as MCL subsidiary Asbury Rapid Transit System, were acquired for $34 million (equivalent to $409 million in 2025). The MTA began operating the lines on March 3, 1958, and continued to do so until the agency was taken over by the Southern California Rapid Transit District on November 5, 1964.

During the MTA's tenure, the last remaining rail transit lines in Los Angeles were abandoned and replaced with bus service, the last former Pacific Electric line in April 1961, and the last former Los Angeles Railway lines in 1963.

== Services ==
=== Rail lines ===
Name	Original company	Abandoned
Bellflower	Pacific Electric	1958
Catalina Dock	Pacific Electric	1958
Long Beach	Pacific Electric	1961
San Pedro via Dominguez	Pacific Electric	1958
Watts Local	Pacific Electric	1959
J	Los Angeles Railway	1963
P	Los Angeles Railway	1963
R	Los Angeles Railway	1963
S	Los Angeles Railway	1963
V	Los Angeles Railway	1963

=== Trolley bus ===
Name	Original company	Converted to trolley bus
2	Los Angeles Railway	1948
3	Los Angeles Railway	1947

== See also ==
- Jim Wilson (Los Angeles), MTA secretary
