= U (Los Angeles Railway) =

Streetcar line in Los Angeles, California, United States

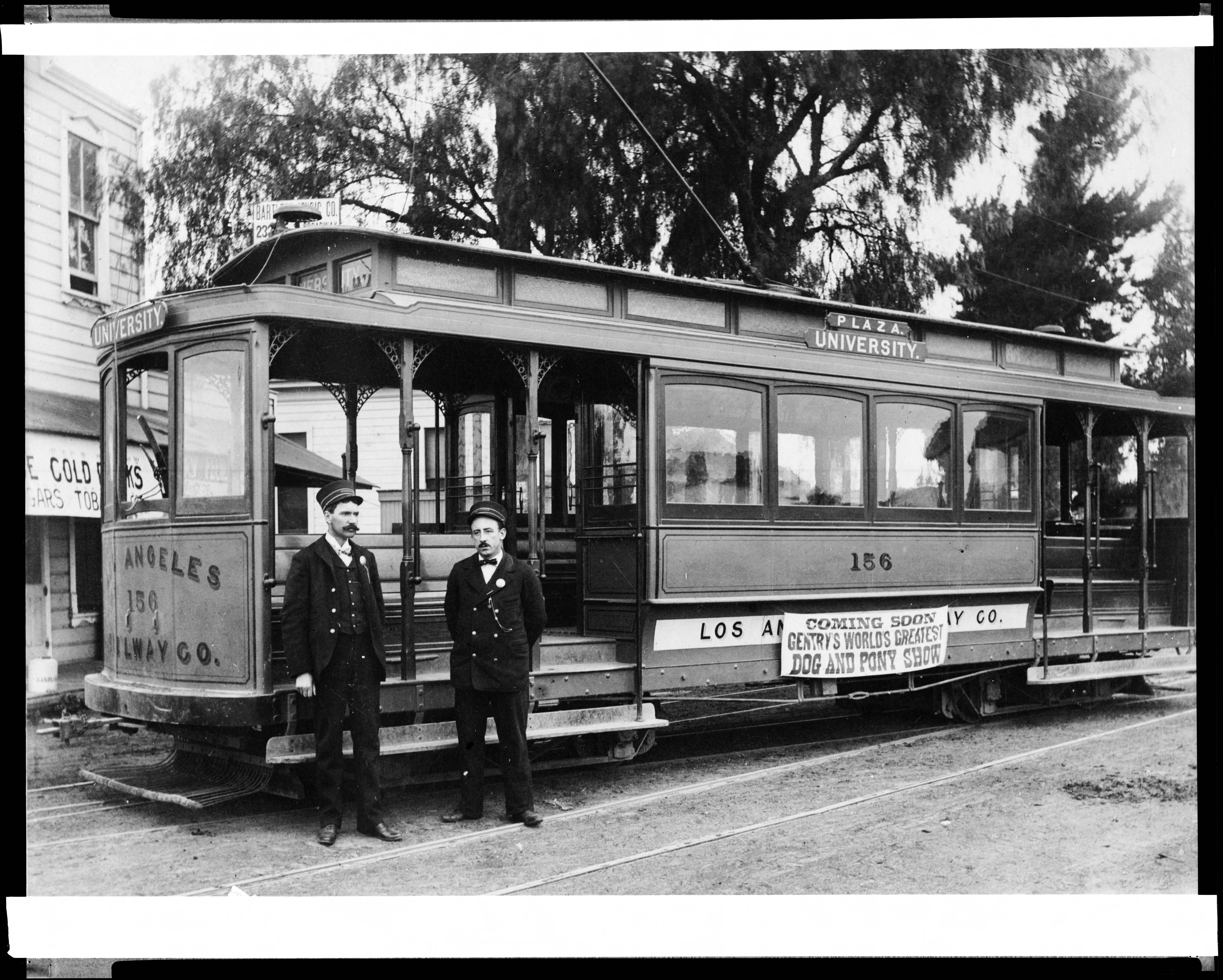
- Car 156 on the University Line, shortly after 1910

Overview
- Locale: Los Angeles

Service
- Type: Streetcar
- System: Los Angeles Railway

History
- Opened: 1891
- Closed: August 3, 1947

Technical
- Track gauge: 3 ft 6 in (1,067 mm)
- Electrification: Overhead line, 600 V DC

U was a streetcar line in Los Angeles, California. Also referred to as the University Line, it provided service to the University of Southern California.

== History ==
The Los Angeles Consolidated Electric Railway University Line dates to November 12, 1891, when the Los Angeles Consolidated Electric Railway began operating on tracks run down McClintock Avenue. The route initially terminated at the Los Angeles Santa Fe station. The line came under the ownership of Los Angeles Railway Company in 1895 and was rerouted in Downtown, terminating at Spring and West 2nd Street. In 1910, the route was combined with trackage built by the Los Angeles and Redondo Railway Company along South Central Avenue, creating a U-shaped route between Central Alameda and USC via Downtown. At the university end, tracks split to three branches: west on 39th to Western, east on 39th to the entrance to Agricultural Park (now Exposition Park), and south to Dalton Avenue and West 45th Street. The Agricultural Park segment was removed from the line in February 1915 and the Dalton segment was rerouted to terminate at Vernon Avenue and Arlington Avenue.

As part of the 1920 rerouting scheme, the line operated as the university and Central Avenue Line which had three branches. These services were designated as the "U" line in 1921. The remaining 39th Street branch line was abandoned on October 5, 1941, and the service was converted to bus operation on August 3, 1947. Segments of the line were absorbed into other routes, the 3 and F, while tracks on McClintock, 32nd, Hoover, Union, 23rd and Estrella were removed.

== See also ==
- Streetcars in Los Angeles

== External lists ==
- U Line Archives — Pacific Electric Railway Historical Society
- "Los Angeles Railway". Electric Railway Historical Association of Southern California.
