= 1955 in rail transport =

This article lists events related to rail transport that occurred in 1955.

== Events ==
=== January events ===
- January
  - Louisville and Nashville Railroad begins the merger process with the Nashville, Chattanooga and St. Louis Railway.
  - The Nashville, Chattanooga and St. Louis Railway's mainline (485 miles of track) is now completely under CTC.
- January 21 - The Milwaukee Road discontinues the western segment of the Columbian, a Chicago - Tacoma, Washington passenger train.
- January 21 - O. Winston Link starts 5-year personal project to document steam operations on the Norfolk and Western Railway in the United States using flash photography.
- January 23 - Sutton Coldfield train disaster, England: a passenger train rounds a sharp curve too fast and derails; 17 people die as a result.
- January 24 - British Transport Commission produces a report on Modernisation and Re-Equipment of British Railways which proposes the large-scale replacement of the steam locomotive by diesel and electrification together with major resignalling projects.

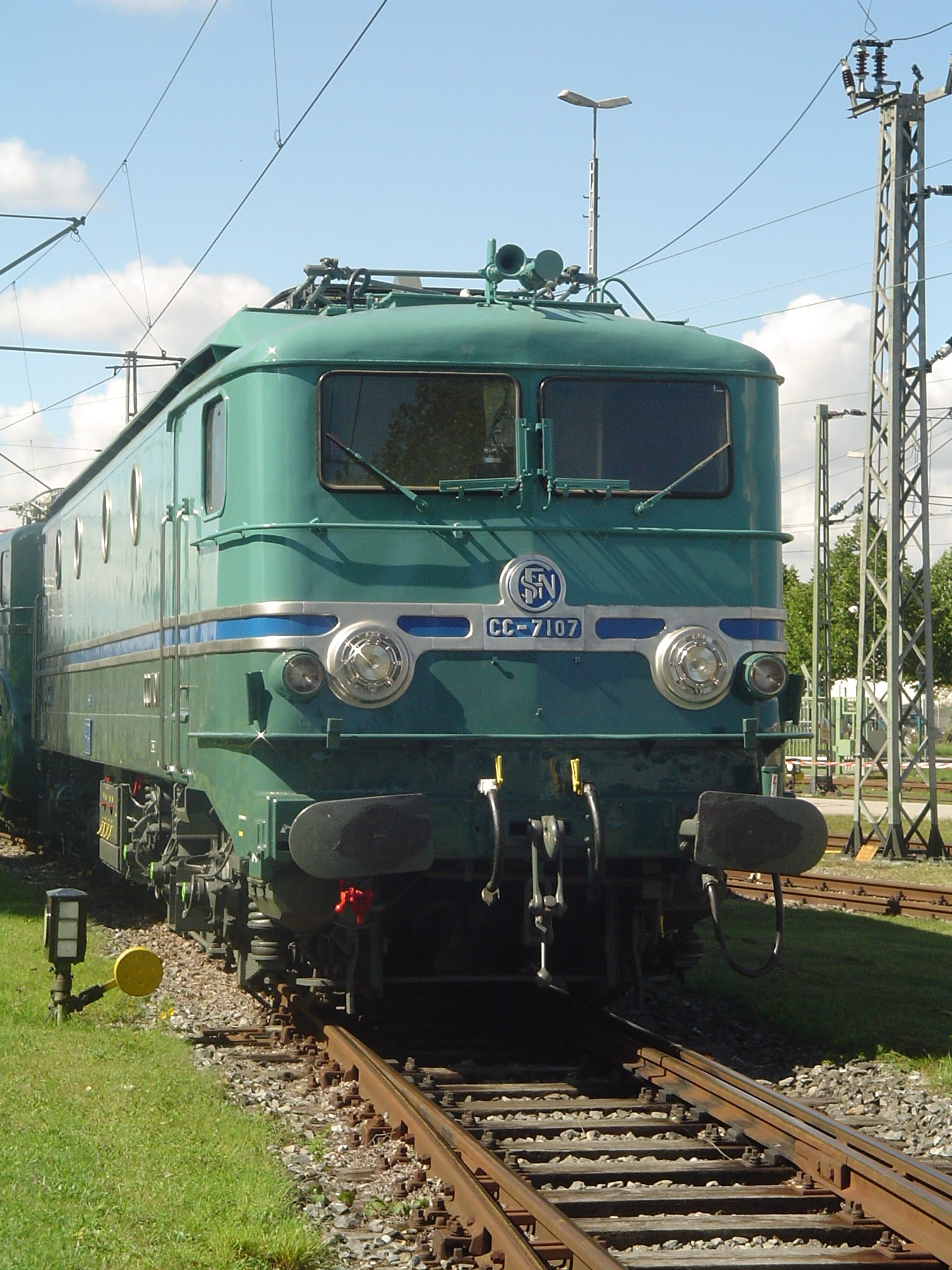
Record-breaking SNCF 7107

=== February events ===
- February 9 - Rome Metro opens in Italy.

=== March events ===
- March 3 - The Pennsylvania Railroad runs its first “TrucTrain” piggyback train from Chicago to Kearny, NJ, the first time the Pennsylvania has carried trailers of common carrier trucking companies on its flatcars.
- March 15 - The first section of Cleveland's “Rapid” opens from Cleveland Union Terminal to Windermere.
- March 17 - Locomotive builders Vulcan Foundry and its subsidiary Robert Stephenson and Hawthorns are absorbed into the English Electric group.
- March 28 & 29 - SNCF in France sets a new world rail speed record of 331 km/h using 1800/2000V dc electric traction. The track is severely damaged by the passage of the train.

=== April events ===
- April – Ferrovias Central of Peru opens a spur line from La Cima to Volcán Mine, reaching an (at this time) world record altitude of 4830 m (15,848 ft).
- April 3 – A passenger train plunges into a canyon in Guadalajara, Mexico; 300 are killed.
- April 23 – Regular passenger service ends on the Canadian Pacific Electric Lines, Canadian Pacific's interurban system in Ontario's Grand River Valley.
- April 24
  - Canadian Pacific Railway inaugurates The Canadian passenger train between Montreal, Quebec / Toronto, Ontario and Vancouver, British Columbia.
  - Canadian National Railway inaugurates the Super Continental passenger train between Montreal, Quebec / Toronto, Ontario and Vancouver, British Columbia.

=== May events ===
- May - ALCO S-6 diesel-electric B-B switcher locomotive introduced.
- May 12 - Manhattan's last elevated railroad becomes history as the NYCTA cuts back the Third Avenue El from Chatham Square in Lower Manhattan to 149th Street, Bronx.
- May 22 - Los Angeles Transit Lines streetcar service ends on five lines: F, 5, 7, 8, and 9.
- May 28 - Associated Society of Locomotive Engineers and Firemen in UK calls a strike which continues until June 14, leading to a state of emergency being declared on May 31.
- May 29 - The Norfolk and Western Railway in the United States begins its conversion to diesel locomotive power from a purely steam locomotive roster with the purchase of eight ALCO RS-3s.

=== June events ===
- June 19 - The Pacific Electric Glendale–Burbank Line interurban ends service in Los Angeles. The Hollywood Subway also closes.

=== July events ===
- July 14 - The Federal from Washington, D.C. to Boston, MA derails in Bridgeport, Connecticut, USA, killing the engineer.
- July 17 - "Santa Fe & Disneyland Railroad" (3 ft (914 mm) gauge) opens as part of the Disneyland theme part at Anaheim, California.
- July 23 - Ffestiniog Railway in North Wales (587 mm) gauge) reopens as a preserved railway.
- July 25 - The New York City Subway system begins using tokens.
- July 27 - Canadian National Railway opens the branch between Hillsport and Manitouwadge, Ontario.
- July 30 - English poet Philip Larkin makes a train journey from Hull to Grantham which inspires his poem The Whitsun Weddings.

=== August events ===
- August 9 - Canadian National Railway opens its part of Walkley Yard in Ottawa, Ontario, Canada.
- August 22 - Spring City, Tennessee, United States: a school bus driver disregards a crossing signal and the bus is struck by a freight train. 11 dead (all school children), 39 hurt.
- August 31 - The Hudson and Manhattan Railroad begins experiments with air conditioning on its subway cars, a technology that the New York City Subway system declared impractical before then. This experiment results in the first successful production application of air conditioning in a rapid transit car, 50 cars (20 owned by H&M, 30 by H&M parent PRR) built by St. Louis Car Company in 1958.

=== September events ===
- September - Delivery by Metropolitan-Vickers of CIÉ 'A' Class, the first production mainline diesels in Ireland.
- September 25 - Canadian Pacific Railway introduces The Atlantic Limited as a limited stop express passenger service from Windsor Station in Montreal, Quebec to Union Station in Saint John, New Brunswick. The named train replaces previous numbered trains and uses a pool of equipment that includes new stainless steel Budd Company cars purchased for The Canadian. Despite running between two Canadian cities, this service is international, since this CPR route runs across the state of Maine (see: International Railway of Maine).

=== October events ===
- October 16 - Ceremonial last day of steam locomotives on the Long Island Rail Road.
- October 30 - The Union Pacific Railroad's Overland Route passenger trains shift from the Chicago and North Western Railway to the Chicago, Milwaukee, St. Paul and Pacific Railroad (the "Milwaukee Road") east of Council Bluffs, Iowa.

=== November events ===
- November - Prototype Deltic diesel locomotive enters service on British Railways.
- 3 November - New Zealand Government Railways replaces Rimutaka Incline by opening of the Rimutaka Tunnel on the Wairarapa Line, at 8.79 km (5.46 mi) the longest in the Southern Hemisphere at this time. The line becomes the first in New Zealand to be wholly dieselised.
- 5 November - Racial segregation is outlawed on trains and buses in Interstate commerce in the United States.
- 15 November - Leningrad Metro opens in Russia.
- 20 November - Milton rail crash: a passenger train takes a crossover too fast and derails at Milton, near Didcot, England. 11 killed, 157 injured

=== December events ===
- 2 December - Barnes rail crash, Barnes, South London, England: collision due to signal error and consequent fire. 13 killed, 35 injured
- 4 December - İstanbul Commuter Railway opened.

=== Unknown date events ===
- Trans-Mongolian Railway is completed to Erenhot on the Chinese border.
- Dome cars are added to the City of Los Angeles as regular equipment.
- Last steam locomotives built by Baldwin Locomotive Works in the United States, Indian Railways standard 5 ft 6 in (1,676 mm) gauge 2-8-2 goods locomotives to Class WG.
- American Locomotive Company is renamed to Alco Products, Inc.
- Ramses Station, Cairo (Egyptian National Railways) is refurbished.
- Norris Roy Crump succeeds George Walker as president of Canadian Pacific Railway.

== Births ==
=== March births ===
- March 1 - Peter Zars, the first on-train birth aboard the California Zephyr passenger train (while the train passes through Ruby Canyon).

=== July births ===
- July 22 - Richard J. Corman, founder and owner of R.J. Corman Railroad Group, is born (died 2013).

== Deaths ==
=== March deaths ===
- March 15 - William R. Coe, chief executive officer of Virginian Railway during World War II (born 1869).

=== June deaths ===
- June 5 - C. P. Couch, president of KCS 1939-1941 (born 1890).
