= M&M =

M&M may refer to:

== Brands and businesses ==
- M&M's, a chocolate confectionery coated with a hard candy shell
- M&M Food Market, a Canadian chain of speciality frozen food stores
- Mahindra & Mahindra, an Indian multinational car manufacturer
- Militzer & Münch, a Swiss logistics service provider

== Music ==
- M&M Studios, a Spanish-dubbing studio
- "M+M's", a song by the American band Blink-182 from Cheshire Cat
- Marcus & Martinus, a Norwegian pop duo (styled as M&M)
- Martha and the Muffins, a Canadian pop band
- Morales and Munzibai, a dance remix and production duo of the 1980s
- Morrissey–Mullen, a British jazz-funk band
- M&M (from Marshall Mathers), former stage name of rapper Eminem
- "M&M's", song by Migos from the mixtape No Label 2

== Science and medicine ==
- Modigliani–Miller theorem, an economic theorem of capital structure
- Morbidity and mortality conference, peer reviews of mistakes in practice of medical services
- McIntyre and McKitrick (2003 and 2005), critiques of "hockey stick graph" temperature reconstructions

== Games ==
- Might and Magic, a role-playing video game series
- Mutants & Masterminds, a pen-and-paper role-playing game

== Arts, entertainment, and media ==
- Men & Motors, a British TV channel
- Mia and Me, a German children's fantasy series
- Minions & Monsters, an animated comedy film

== Other uses ==
- M&M Boys, the nickname given to baseball players Mickey Mantle and Roger Maris
- McClintic-Marshall House, a Lehigh University living unit
- The Master and Margarita, novel by Russian writer Mikhail Bulgakov
- Mountain and moorland pony breeds, a group of pony types native to the British Isles

== See also ==
- MM (disambiguation)
- MNM (disambiguation)
- Morbidity and mortality (disambiguation)
