= M2 =

M2, M-2, M.2 or M02 may refer to:

== Entertainment ==
- M² (album), a 2001 album by jazz musician Marcus Miller
- m² (artist), an ambient project of Mathis Mootz
- M2 (game developer), Japanese game developer
- M2 (TV channel), a Hungarian TV channel
- M2 (Ukraine), a Ukrainian music television channel
- M2, branding used by some programming on South Korean music television channel Mnet (TV channel)
- M2, the former name for MTV2, an American TV channel
- M2 Entertainment (M2E), film production company founded by Australian filmmaker Murali K. Thalluri in 2006

== Computing ==
- M.2, a specification for internally mounted expansion cards
- Apple M2, a central processing unit in the Apple M series
- Socket M2, a CPU socket
- Memory Stick Micro, a removable flash memory card format
- Fast Universal Digital Computer M-2, an early Russian digital computer (1957)
- Modula-2, a computer programming language
- Macaulay2, a free computer algebra system

== Military ==
=== Vehicles ===
- M2 (missile), a French submarine-launched ballistic missile
- M2 Bradley, an armored fighting vehicle
- M2 half-track car
- M2 light tank
- M2 medium tank
- HMS Havelock (1915) (M2), a WWI British Royal Navy monitor
- HMS M2, a 1919 submarine
- HSwMS M2, a Swedish Navy mine sweeper
- HSwMS Älvsborg (M02), a Swedish Royal Navy mine layer
- Miles M.2 Hawk, a 1930s British two-seat light monoplane
- M2 high-speed tractor, a military aircraft tug

=== Weapons ===
- M2 Ball, ammunition
- M2 Browning, a heavy machine gun in use since the 1920s
- M2 carbine, a select-fire carbine
- M2 flamethrower
- M2 Hyde, submachine gun
- M2 mine, a World War II land mine
- M2 mortar, a 60 mm infantry mortar
- M2 4.2-inch mortar, a 107mm infantry mortar
- M2 tripod, a weapon mount
- Mauser M2, semi-automatic handgun made by Mauser Jagdwaffen GmbH
- M2 Aiming Circle, an optical survey device to measure deflection angles and elevation off a predefined azimuth
- M2 compass (Brunton compass), used for mortars and field artillery; uses 6400 mils as opposed to 360 degrees
- M2 howitzer, the WW2 designation for the M101 howitzer
- M2/M4 Selectable Lightweight Attack Munition (SLAM), a land mine
- Anti-Aircraft Target Rocket M2, a World War II training rocket

== Transport ==
=== Bus routes ===
- M2 (New York City bus), a New York City Bus route in Manhattan
- Route M-2 (MTA Maryland), a bus route in Baltimore, Maryland and its suburbs
- M2, a bus rapid transit route in Brisbane

=== Metro lines ===
- M2 (Copenhagen Metro), a line of the Copenhagen Metro, colored yellow on the map
- M2 (Istanbul Metro), a metro line in Turkey
- Lausanne Metro Line M2, part of the Lausanne Metro in Switzerland
- Paris Metro Line 2, part of the Paris Metro in France
- Bucharest Metro Line M2, part of the Bucharest Metro, Romania
- Metro Line M2 (Budapest Metro), the second line of Budapest Metro, Hungary
- M2 (Warsaw), the second line of Warsaw Metro, Poland
- Milan Metro Line 2

=== Roads ===
- List of M2 roads
- M2 (Brisbane), Australia
- M2 (Johannesburg), a Metropolitan Route in Johannesburg, South Africa
- M2 (Pretoria), a Metropolitan Route in Pretoria, South Africa
- M2 (Sydney), Australia
- M2 motorway (Great Britain)
- M-2 (Kosovo)

=== Vehicles ===
- M2 (railcar), a Metro-North Railroad railcar
- BMW M2, a variant of the BMW 2 Series
- Freightliner Business Class M2, a cubetruck and chassis variants
- Kubicek M-2 Scout, a Czech ultralight aircraft
- LNER Class M2, a class of British steam locomotives
- Sri Lanka Railways M2, diesel-electric locomotives

== Science ==
- M2 protein, an ion channel in the cell membrane of the influenza A virus
- ATC code M02, Topical products for joint and muscular pain, a subgroup of the Anatomical Therapeutic Chemical Classification System
- British NVC community M2, a mire biological community in the United Kingdom
- Messier 2, a globular cluster in the constellation Aquarius
- Muscarinic acetylcholine receptor M_{2}, a muscarinic receptor for acetylcholine found mainly in the heart
- M2 or M_{2}, the principal lunar semi-diurnal constituent of tides on Earth
- M2, a form of high speed steel in the tungsten-molybdenum series
- M2 macrophage, a phenotype of macrophage
- M2 (economics), a measure of the money supply
- M^{2}, a measure of laser beam quality

== Other ==
- M2 (Mazda), a marketing approach by Mazda
- M2 Group, an Australian seller of telecommunications services, power, gas, and insurance products
- M-2 visa, a type of United States visa for the dependents of an individual with an M-1 visa
- MII (videocassette format) (pronounced "M-2"), a professional analogue videocassette format from Panasonic
- Leica M2, a 35 mm rangefinder camera introduced in 1957
- Panasonic M2, a video game console design
- m^{2} or square metre, a unit of area
- M2, one of the ISO metric screw thread sizes
- M2 World Championship, the second esports Mobile Legends: Bang Bang World Championship held in 2021
- M2, a difficulty grade in mixed climbing
- M2 Competition, a New Zealand auto racing team
- M2, a monetary aggregate

== See also ==
- M² (disambiguation)
- MII (disambiguation)
- Model 2 (disambiguation)
- MM (disambiguation)
- 2M (disambiguation)
