= M series =

M series may refer to:

== Technology ==
=== Computers ===
- M series (Apple silicon), a family of systems on a chip
- M series (computer), designed in the USSR
- Juniper M series, of routers
- ThinkCentre M series, of desktop computers
- Sony Vaio M series, of desktop and netbook computers

=== Mobile phones ===
- Samsung Galaxy M series
- Sony Ericsson M series
- Meizu M series

== Transportation ==
- Bedford M series, a truck chassis
- Cummins M-series engine, a diesel engine for buses and trucks
- Dodge M-series chassis, a motorhome chassis
- M series (Toronto subway)
- Rover M-series engine, a line of 4-cylinder gasoline car engines
- Studebaker M-series truck
- TVR M series, a series of sports cars

== Other uses ==
- M-series bayonet, for rifles
- Leica M series, a series of cameras
- QI (M series), the twelfth series of quiz show QI
- Mobile Legends: Bang Bang World Championship, an annual esports tournament

== See also ==
- M (disambiguation)
