= M² =

M^{2} or m^{2} may refer to:

- Square metre (m^{2}), an SI measure of area
- M squared (M^{2}), a measure of laser beam quality
- M^{2} (album), by Marcus Miller
- m^{2} (artist), German DJ and musician Mathis Mootz

== See also ==
- M2 (disambiguation)
- M (disambiguation)
