= M line =

M line may refer to:

- M-line (mittel line or middle line), a structure in a muscle sarcomere
- M Ocean View, a light rail and former streetcar line in San Francisco, California
- M-Line Trolley, a streetcar line in Dallas, Texas
- M (Los Angeles Railway), a former streetcar service
- M (SEPTA Metro), a light metro in Montgomery County, Pennsylvania.
- Geometric mean

== See also ==
- M Train (disambiguation), several train services
- M1 (disambiguation)#Railways
- Line M (disambiguation)
