= 9 (Los Angeles Railway) =

Streetcar route (1932–1955)

Overview
- Owner: Los Angeles Railway
- Locale: Los Angeles
- Termini: 3rd Street and Santa Fe Avenue; 48th Street and Crenshaw Boulevard
- Stations: 32

Service
- Type: Streetcar
- System: Los Angeles Railway
- Daily ridership: 10,459 (1940)

History
- Opened: June 12, 1932
- Closed: May 22, 1955

Technical
- Track gauge: 3 ft 6 in (1,067 mm)
- Electrification: Overhead line, 600 V DC

9 was a streetcar line in Los Angeles, California. It was operated by the Los Angeles Railway from 1932 to 1955.

== History ==
When the M Line was split up in 1932, the segments on 48th and 54th Streets were spun off into their own service: the 9 car. It ran from 48th and Crenshaw to 54th and Crenshaw, in a U-shaped routing via Downtown.

Map of services; 1934–1939 routing of the 9 is in red

The service was rerouted in 1934, with the outbound terminal remaining at 48th and Crenshaw and cars running to the Atchison, Topeka and Santa Fe Railway's La Grande Station on tracks used by the 7. (Former tracks were taken over by 8 service.) The line ran from 3rd Street and Santa Fe Avenue to 48th Street and Crenshaw Boulevard, by way of 3rd Street, 2nd Street Broadway, Pico Boulevard, Grand Avenue, Santa Barbara Avenue, Hoover Street, and 48th Street.

The line was again rerouted in 1939 as the 48th Street segment of the old 9 was combined with portions of the former 2 and 10 cars. At the intersection of Pasadena and Broadway, the line split into two branches: one to Montecito Drive and one to Mission Road. With the recent opening of Union Station and closure of La Grande Station, the segment of Los Angeles Railway tracks leading to the old facility also abandoned. The branch to Montecito Drive via Griffin Avenue was abandoned in April 1948. Service on the whole line ended after May 22, 1955 when the line was converted to bus operations.
