= Studebaker Coupe Express =

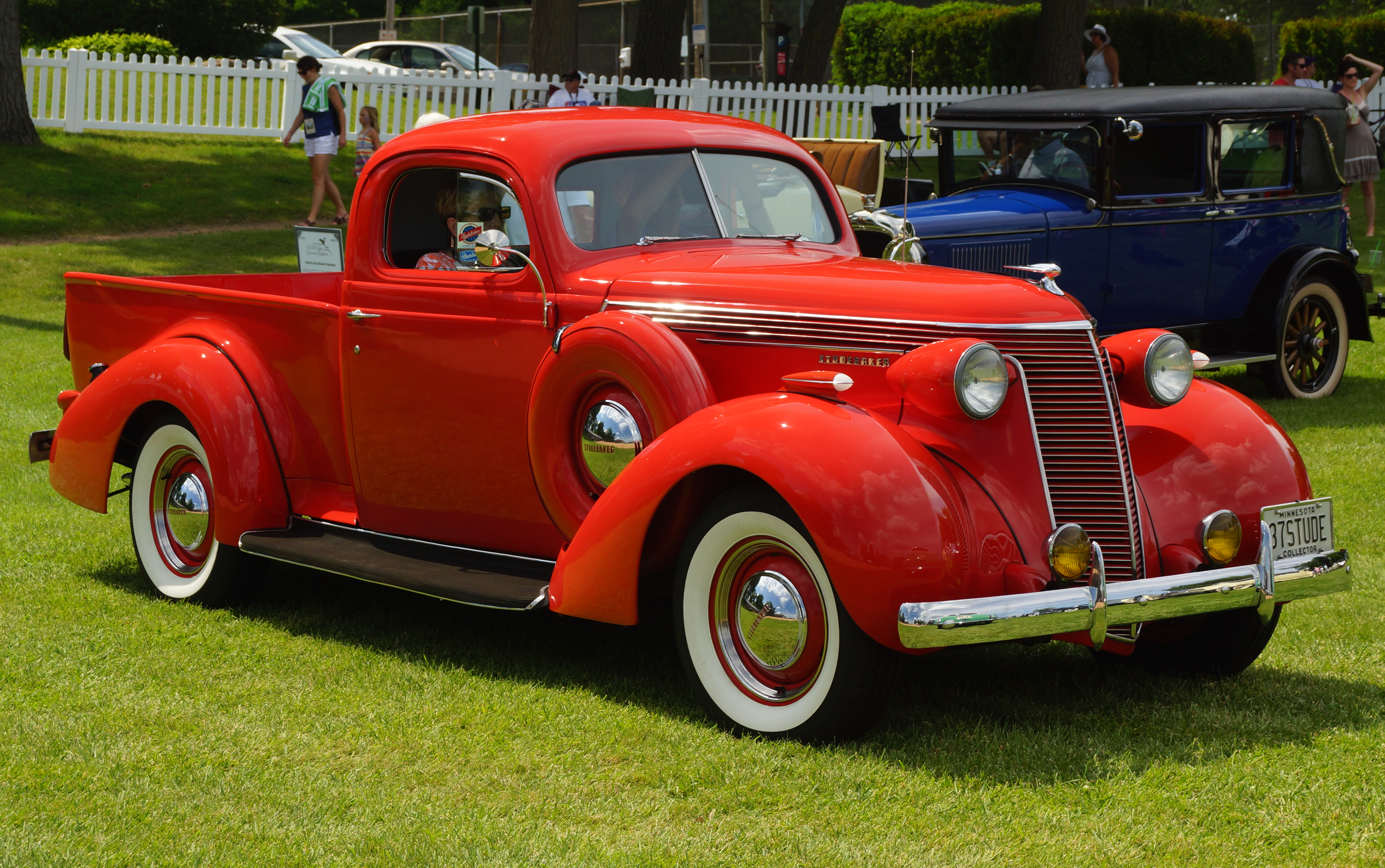
- 1937 Coupe Express

Overview
- Manufacturer: Studebaker
- Production: 1937–1939

Body and chassis
- Body style: 2-door coupe utility
- Layout: Front-engine, rear-wheel-drive

Chronology
- Successor: Studebaker M-Series

The Studebaker Coupe Express is a passenger car based coupe utility, produced by the Studebaker Corporation of South Bend, Indiana, between 1937 and 1939. Featuring an automobile styled cab and flared rear fenders right off the Studebaker Dictator, it was sold both with a manufacturer supplied pick up style metal bed, and as a rolling chassis and cab to be fitted with a bed or boxes by the purchaser.

== Description ==
The Coupe Express was designed by Raymond Loewy and utilized the Dictator passenger car frame, running gear, and front sheet metal. A new body stamping was made to form the cab back. The model was sold both with a manufacturer supplied metal bed and as a cab and chassis, with the Dictator’s automobile-style sweepingly flared rear fenders attached. A service box, built to specification, would be fabricated by (or for) the end user (such as a plumber or electrician).

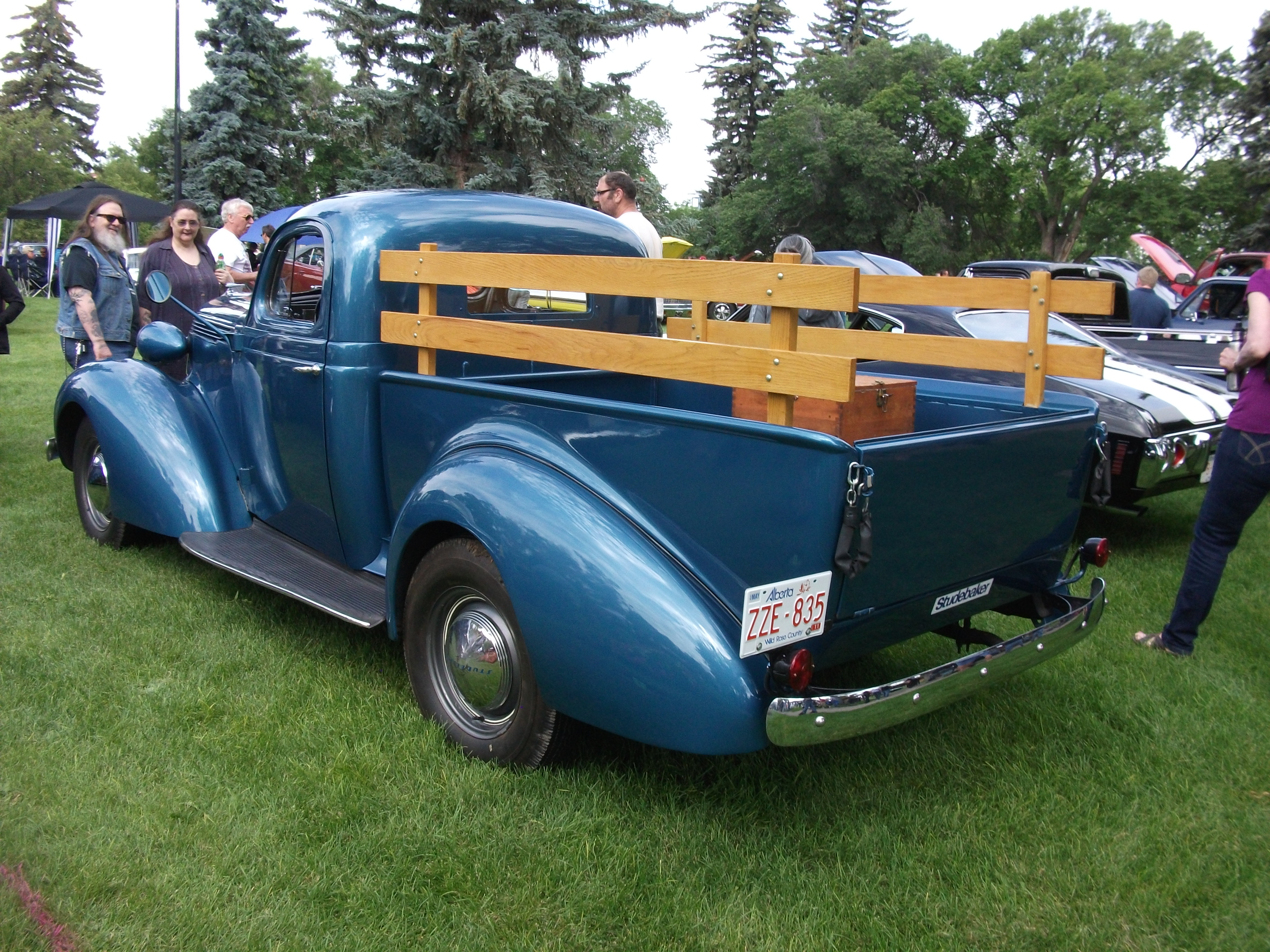
1937 Coupe Express rear

The truck was powered by the larger of Studebaker's L-head six-cylinder flathead engines and mated to a 3-speed manual transmission. Studebaker offered a Borg-Warner 3-speed transmission with overdrive as an option. Other options included a radio, heater, wire reinforced sliding back window and turn indicators. Two optional wheels were available, including a stamped steel disc wheel and a stamped steel 'artillery' spoked wheel.

Production for the 1937 model year was approximately 3,000 units.

The truck's passenger cab was restyled in 1938 to reflect the modernized passenger car sheet metal resulted a slightly longer pickup bed. Production for 1938 was approximately 1,200 units.

The 1939 model was again remodeled to reflect Studebaker's annual design updates. Production was approximately 1,000 units. The Coupe Express model was discontinued after the 1939 model year, and Studebaker did not offer a successor model for 1940.

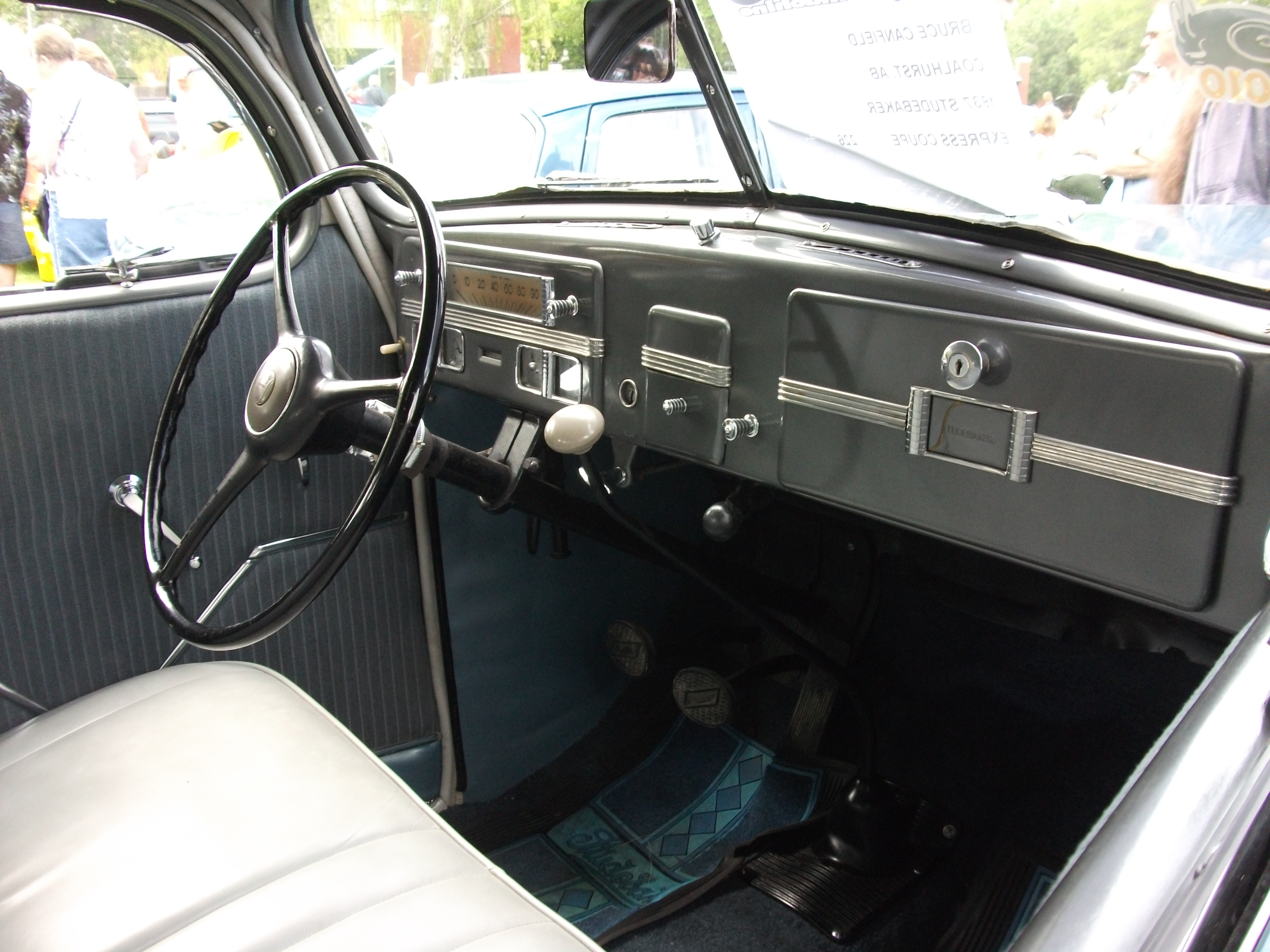
1937 Coupe Express interior

Studebaker introduced the M-Series pickup truck 1941, while the company used the Coupe Express name in advertising for a time, but no M-Series trucks were ever officially designated as the Coupe Express.

== Designation ==
Whether the Coupe Express is a coupe utility or a pickup truck is hard to define. It lacks the integrated bed of a car-based, car-chassied coupe utility – a fundamental characteristic of that automobile style. However, it also lacks the truck cab and truck chassis of a pickup truck, failing to meet that definition by either of those two crucial characteristics. The fact that Studebaker itself labeled it a “coupe” rather than a truck (a very different thing at that time; retained a stylish, even luxurious, interior instead of replacing it with a more utilitarian one; and never named or officially referred to any of its actual pickup trucks with the terms “coupe“ or “express“, further distance it from being labeled as one.
