= M (disambiguation) =

M, or m, is the thirteenth letter of the English alphabet.

M may also refer to:

== Arts and entertainment ==
=== Fictional characters ===
- M (Marvel Comics), also known as Penance and Monet Yvette Clarisse Maria Therese St. Croix, a mutant associated with the X-Men
- M (James Bond), the codename of the fictional Chief of the SIS (commonly known as "MI6")
- Minoru Kokubunji, also known as "M", from the manga and anime series Chobits

=== Film and television ===
- M (1931 film), a German film directed by Fritz Lang
- M (1951 film), a remake of the previous, shifting the action from Berlin to Los Angeles
- M, a 2006 Japanese film directed by Ryūichi Hiroki
- M (2007 film), made in South Korea
- M (2018 Finnish film), a film directed by Anna Eriksson, loosely inspired by the last days of Marilyn Monroe
- M (2018 French film), a documentary film directed by Yolande Zauberman about child abuse in Bnei Brak
- M, an obsolete film rating in the American Motion Picture Association of America film rating system
- M, films recommended for mature audiences in the Australian Office of Film and Literature Classification
- Manchete, a Brazilian television network from 1983 to 1999
- MBC M, a South Korean television channel
- The Romans, a 1965 Doctor Who serial (production code M)

=== Literature ===
- M (comic strip), a Norwegian comic strip
- M (John Cage book), a 1973 book by avant garde composer John Cage
- M (Peter Robb book), a 1998 book by Peter Robb about the Italian painter Caravaggio
- M (magazine), a monthly teenage magazine published by Bauer Media Group
- M: Son of the Century, a 2018 historical novel by Antonio Scurati

=== Music ===
==== Performers ====
- M (band), a British techno-pop project of the artist Robin Scott
- Matthieu Chedid, French singer, known by the stage name "-M-"
- Lee Min-woo, Korean singer, known by the stage name "M"
- Mem Nahadr, American singer and performance artist, known by the stage name "M"

==== Albums ====
- M (John Abercrombie Quartet album), 1981
- M (Myrkur album), 2015
- M (Big Bang single album), 2015

==== Songs ====
- "M" (Ayumi Hamasaki song), 2000
- "M" (Soccer Mommy song), 2024
- "M", by Chantal Kreviazuk from Colour Moving and Still
- "M", by The Cure from their 1980 album Seventeen Seconds
- "M", by Princess Princess from the 1989 album Diamonds
- "M's" (song), 2015, by ASAP Rocky

==== Other uses in music ====
- Measure (abbreviated "m.") or bar (music), a segment of beats

=== Video games ===
- Mature, a rating used by the Entertainment Software Rating Board

== Brands and businesses ==
- M (fragrance), 2008, by Mariah Carey
- Macy's, Inc. (NYSE: M), an American department store chain
- Miracle Mart, a Canadian department store known simply as "M" from 1986 to 1992
- M Resort, a hotel-casino in Las Vegas, Nevada, U.S.

== Language ==
- A voiced bilabial nasal sound (International Phonetic Alphabet symbol "m")
- М, a letter of the Cyrillic alphabet
- 'm, contraction of am, part of the English copular verb to be
- m, the masculine grammatical gender

== Mathematics, science, and technology ==
=== Physical sciences ===
- Seismic magnitude scales, various scales of magnitude using variations of M
- Messier object, in astronomy
- M-theory, a proposed solution for problems in superstring theories
- Magnetic quantum number (symbol m)
- Mass (symbol m)
- Metal (placeholder symbol M)
- Molar mass, (symbol M)
- Molality (symbol m)
- Molar concentration, unit m
- Methionine, an alpha amino acid in biochemistry

=== Electronics, telecommunications, and computing ===
==== Computer programming ====
- M or Wolfram Language, the programming language underlying Mathematica
- ".m", a MATLAB or GNU Octave file
- ".m", a Mathematica package
- ".m", an implementation file in Objective-C
- M, the MUMPS programming language
- M-code or just M, MATLAB programming language

==== Other uses in electronics, telecommunications, and computing ====
- M-series rangefinder, a series of Leica camera models
- M (videocassette format), an obsolete recording format
- M band, radio frequencies from 60 to 100 GHz
- Android M, a code name for the Android Marshmallow operating system
- M (virtual assistant), a former virtual assistant in Facebook Messenger

=== Other uses in science, technology, and mathematics ===
- Slope of a line, commonly denoted m
- ATC code M Musculo-skeletal system, a section of the Anatomical Therapeutic Chemical Classification System

== Numbers and units of measurement ==
- 1000 (number), Roman numeral M
- Million
- mega-, SI prefix M
- milli-, SI prefix m
- Metre, symbol m
- Mile (usually abbreviated "mi")
- Nautical mile
- Minute, symbol m

== Places ==
- Toronto in Canada (postal code letter M)
- M postcode area, a group of several postcode districts in Greater Manchester, UK
- Madura (vehicle registration prefix M)

== Politics ==
- M., the regnal year abbreviation for Mary I of England following her marriage to Philip II of Spain
- Moderaterna, a Swedish political party
- Honório de Freitas Guimarães (1902–1968), member of the Brazilian Communist Party

== Religious literature ==
- M-Source, a hypothetical source document for the Gospel of Matthew
- 𝕸, the Masoretic Text, the authoritative Hebrew text of the Tanakh

== Transportation ==
=== Rail ===
- Rapid transit, sometimes called "metro", especially for underground systems, and abbreviated as "M"
- M (New York City Subway service)
- M (SEPTA Metro)
- M Ocean View, San Francisco, U.S.
- Tokyo Metro Marunouchi Line, Tokyo Metro
- Midōsuji Line, Osaka Metro
- Honshi–Bisan Line, West Japan Railway Company

=== Other uses in transportation ===
- M, the prefix used for British motorways
- Mercedes-Benz M-Class
- BMW M, a subsidiary of car manufacturer BMW
- Farmall M, a tractor produced by International Harvester from 1939 to 1952
- Infiniti M, a line of cars
- Mu (rocket family), also known as M, a series of Japanese solid-fuelled carrier rockets

== Other uses ==
- Male, gender
- Married, sometimes abbreviated m.
- Mike, the military time zone code for UTC+12:00
- Monsieur, abbreviated "M."
- Baby M, subject of a famous child custody battle
- M-ratio, a measure of the health of a player's chip stack in poker
- German gold mark, old German curreny, abbreviated M
- Azerbaijani manat, currency, abbreviated m. or man.

== See also ==
- \m/, a common way of typing corna or devil's horns
- M series (disambiguation)
- M Train (disambiguation)
- Mister M (disambiguation)
- MU (disambiguation) (mu; Ancient Greek: Μ / Greek: μ)
- MM (disambiguation)
