= MRM =

MRM or mrm may refer to:

== Places ==
- Mad River Mountain, a ski resort in western Ohio, United States
- Manari Airport (IATA airport code: MRM), an airport in Manari, Papua New Guinea
- Marymount MRT station (MRT station abbreviation), Singapore
- McArthur River mine (disambiguation), multiple locations

== Activism ==
- Magyar Remény Mozgalom, a Hungarian political movement
- Maldives Reform Movement
- Men's rights movement, a social and political movement concerned with the legal and societal rights of men, primarily in Western cultures and India
- Respect Moldova Movement (Mișcarea Respect Moldova), a Moldovan political party

== Management ==
- Maintenance Resource Management, a human-error reduction strategy in aviation maintenance operations
- Maritime Resource Management, a human factors training programme aimed at the maritime industry
- Masters of Resource Management, a degree conferred by the School of Resource and Environmental Management at Simon Fraser University in Burnaby, British Columbia, Canada

== Science ==
- Magnetic Resonance in Medicine, an academic journal
- Magnetic Resonance Microscopy, a magnetic resonance imaging technique at a microscopic level
- Mini-Research Module (disambiguation) (MRM-1 and MRM-2), two Russian-built labs on the International Space Station
- Minsky register machine, a type of abstract computing device propounded by Marvin Minsky
- Minterm-ring map, a variant of Karnaugh maps by Thomas R. McCalla in logic minimization
- Multiple reaction monitoring, a method for targeted quantitative mass spectrometry
- Multiple reciprocity method, a method similar to the boundary particle method

== Other ==
- MRM or McCann Relationship Marketing, a global Internet professional services company
- Mechanically recovered meat, a paste/batter-like meat product
- Merlav language (ISO 639-3 code: mrm)
- Metered reply mail, a self-addressed envelopes or postcards with postage prepaid with a postage meter
- Monticello Railway Museum, a museum in Monticello, Illinois, United States
- Mountaintop removal mining
- Team Milram (UCI team code), a German pro cycling team
- XM1111 Mid-Range Munition

== See also ==
- Mister M (disambiguation) (Mr M)
