= M (Los Angeles Railway) =

Streetcar routes in Los Angeles, California (1917 to 1941)

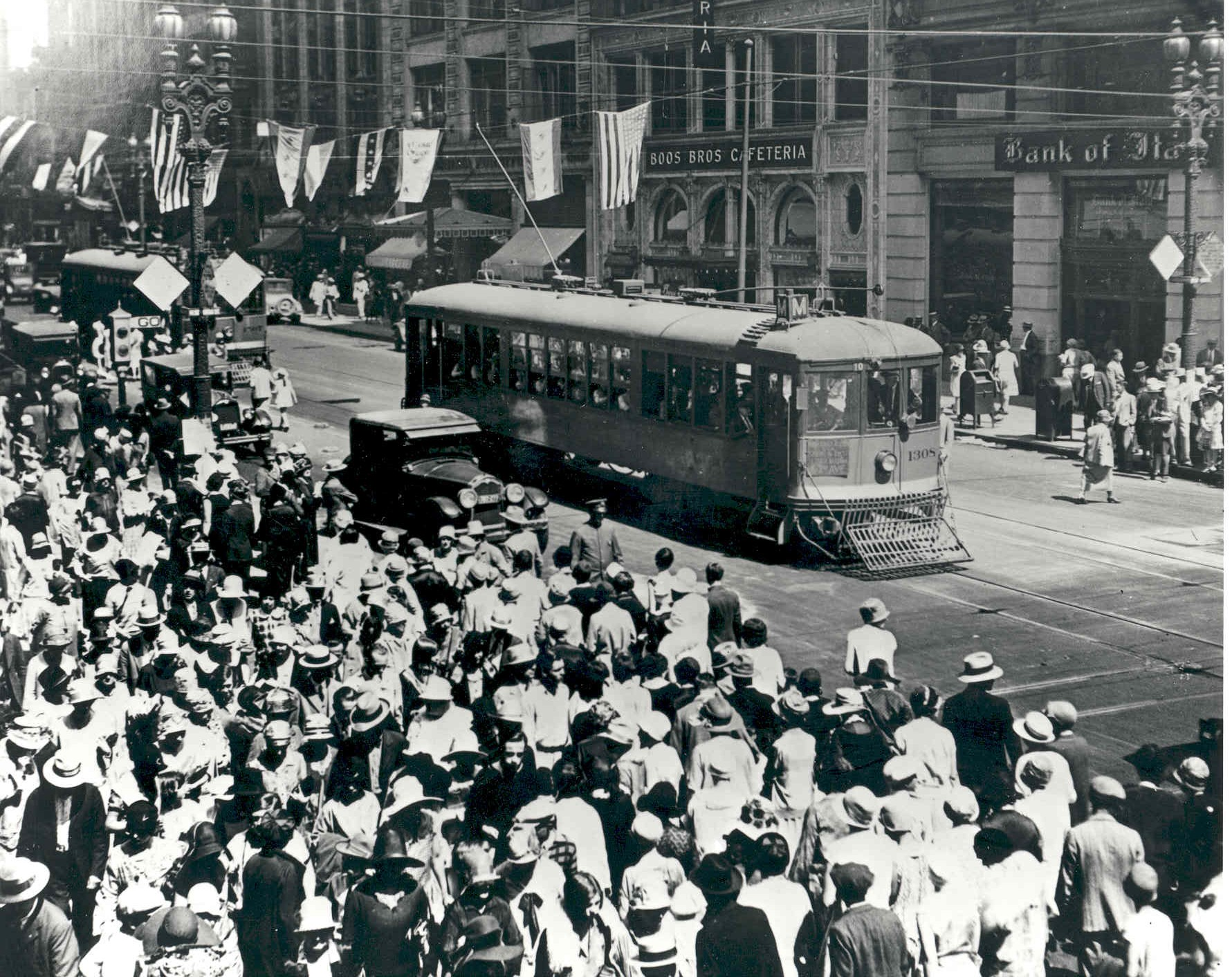
- An M car at Broadway and 7th, c. 1920s

Overview
- Locale: Los Angeles

Service
- Type: Streetcar
- System: Los Angeles Railway

History
- Opened: 1917
- Closed: November 4, 1941

Technical
- Track gauge: 3 ft 6 in (1,067 mm)
- Electrification: Overhead line, 600 V DC

M refers to several streetcar routes in Los Angeles, California. The lines were operated by the Los Angeles Railway from 1917 to 1941.

== History ==
The Homeward Avenue Line ran on Moneta Avenue and Athens Way. It began as a new routing of two former services in 1917. With the 1920 restructuring of routes, the line became a leg of the Grand & Moneta line. The new service ran from Crenshaw Avenue and West 54th Street via a circuitous route through Downtown Los Angeles to Moneta Avenue and West 54th Street where the lines split to two branches. One went west to 2nd Avenue, creating a loop route, and another continuing further south on Moneta via the Homewood Avenue branch's former terminal at Manchester. The line was given the letter designation M in 1921. M service absorbed the South Broadway Shuttle in 1924 and was extended south to Athens and 116th. Two new branches were similarly created from remnants of older routes a few months later: one in the west to Vernon and Arlington and an extension on Santa Barbara Avenue. In May 1931, tracks on 48th Street were extended to Crenshaw Avenue. The route was split into multiple segments the following year, with portions becoming new routings of the 7, 8, 9, and 10.

== Rolling Stock ==
Starting in November 1921, Type H cars served the line. Initially developed for the E Line, these were the first all-steel cars built for the company.

== Mateo Street Shuttle ==
The 36 was a segment of the La Salle Street and Mateo Street Line until 1920 when major rerouting took place. Shuttle service operated on Mateo Avenue and Santa Fe Street between 1st and 7th, running past the Atchison, Topeka and Santa Fe Railway station. The line was numbered 11 by 1932. The route number was changed to the letter M on May 19, 1939. Streetcar service ended on October 4, 1941.

== See also ==
- Streetcars in Los Angeles
