= Line M =

Line M may refer to:

- M (New York City Subway service), a rapid transit service in New York City
- Mattapan Line, a light rail line in Boston
- Marunouchi Line, a rapid transit line in Tokyo
- M Ocean View, a light rail line in San Francisco
- Midōsuji Line, a rapid transit line in Osaka
- Minatomirai Line, a rapid transit line in Yokohama
- Meijō Line, a rapid transit line in Nagoya
- Moshtohor, a rabbit breed

== See also ==
- M line (disambiguation)
