= 2M =

2M or 2-M may refer to:

- 2m, or two metres
- 2 million
- Amateur radio 2-meter band
- 2M (alliance), a container shipping industry alliance between Maersk Line and MSC
- 2M TV, a Moroccan state-owned TV station
- Moldavian Airlines, IATA airline designator 2M
- a prefix used by the Two Micron All-Sky Survey (2MASS)

== See also ==
- M2 (disambiguation)
- MM (disambiguation)
