= Studebaker US6 2½-ton 6×6 truck =

American exported military cargo vehicle

Studebaker US6
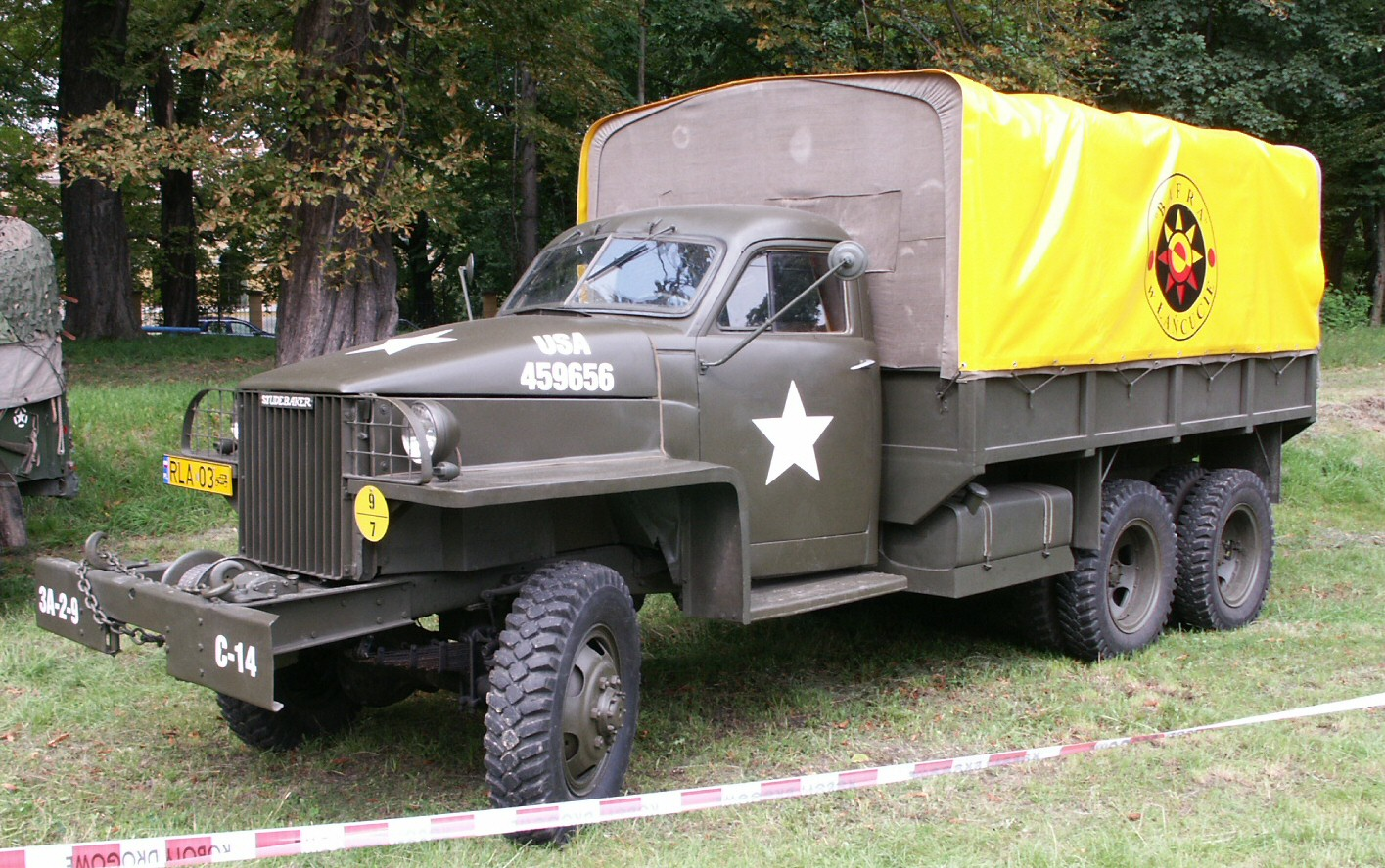
- Studebaker US6 U4 Cargo truck
- Type: 2 1/2-ton 6×6 trucks and 5-ton 6×4 trucks
- Place of origin: Studebaker Automotive Plant, South Bend, Indiana, US; Studebaker Chippewa Ave. Assembly, South Bend, Indiana, US

Production history
- Designer: Studebaker
- Designed: Before 1940
- Manufacturer: Studebaker and REO
- Produced: 1941–1945
- No. built: 219,882, almost 90% by Studebaker

Specifications (U1 Cargo)
- Mass: 9,875 lb (4,479 kg) empty
- Length: 20 ft 11 in (6.38 m)
- Width: 7 ft 4 in (2.24 m)
- Height: 7 ft 3 in (2.21 m) top of cab 8 ft 10 in (2.69 m) overall
- Engine: Hercules JXD inline-6 gasoline motor 86 hp (64 kW)
- Transmission: 5 speed × 2 range transfer case
- Suspension: Beam axles on leaf springs
- Operational range: 236 mi (380 km)
- Maximum speed: 45 mph (72 km/h)

The Studebaker US6 (G630) was a series of 2 1/2-ton 6×6 and 5-ton 6×4 trucks manufactured by the Studebaker Corporation and REO Motor Car Company during World War II. The basic cargo version was designed to transport a 2 1/2-short-ton (5,000 lb; 2,300 kg) cargo load over any type of terrain in any weather. Most of these were exported to the Soviet Union under Lend-Lease by the US during World War II, since the competing GMC 6×6 CCKW design proved to be more suitable for Western Front conditions.

== History ==
=== Design and development ===
In 1939–1940, the US Army Ordnance Corps was developing 2 1/2-short-ton (2,300 kg) tactical 6×6 trucks that could operate off-road in all weather. Studebaker, Yellow Coach (a GM company) and International Harvester all submitted designs that were accepted and went into production in 1941.

More than 200,000 2 1/2-ton 6×6 trucks and similar 5-short-ton (4,500 kg) 6×4 versions in 13 variations were built. Studebaker was the primary manufacturer, which built 197,678 of them at its South Bend, Indiana plant, while REO produced 22,204 more at its Lansing, Michigan plant from 1944 under a sub-contract. Reo trucks are identical to Studebakers, but Reo built only cargo-model trucks with the long wheelbase and without the front-mounted winch, more specifically referred to as the US6 U9. All production by both manufacturers ended in 1945.

=== Service ===
The US6 was manufactured primarily for export under Lend-Lease. The Soviet Union would become the largest foreign operator. The first Studebaker US6 trucks arrived in the USSR in the autumn of 1941. The Red Army organized a test of eleven 6×6 US6 trucks which took place between July 1942 and May 1943. The results were used to direct the enlargement of the payload from 2 1/2 to 4 short tons (2,300 to 3,600 kg). In 1945, it was lowered to 3 1/2 short tons (3,200 kg), although on improved roads they could carry up to a maximum of 5 short tons (4,500 kg).

Large numbers of Studebaker US6 trucks were supplied to the Soviet Union via the Persian Corridor in Iran under the US's Lend-Lease program. The truck fulfilled many important roles in service with Soviet military forces during the war, such as towing artillery pieces and anti-tank guns and transporting troops over long distances. It was renowned for its overall ruggedness and reliability, including its ability to run on poor-quality fuel. The Soviet Red Army also found them to be a suitable platform for conversion into Katyusha rocket launchers, although this was not their main purpose. The truck became affectionately known as the Studer by Soviet troops and was even recognized of its importance (to the Soviet war effort) by Joseph Stalin, who sent a personal letter of appreciation to Studebaker, in which he thanked it for the superb quality of the US6 for Soviet service.

Studebaker US6 trucks were also used by the US military in the construction of the Ledo Road in Burma, and the Alcan Highway in North America, during WWII.

== Specifications ==
=== Engine and driveline ===
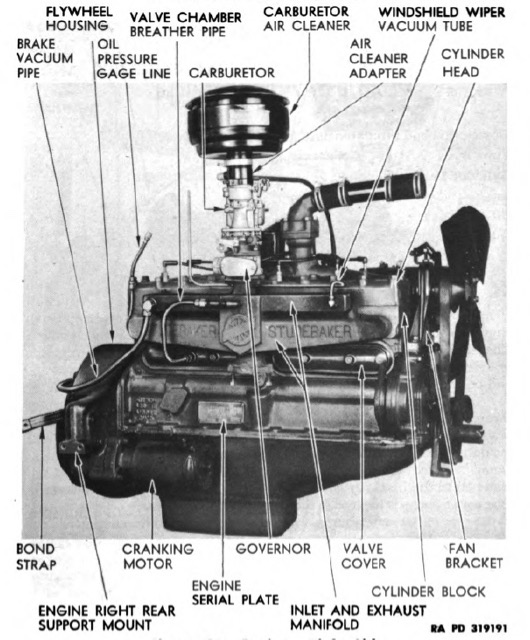
Hercules JXD engine

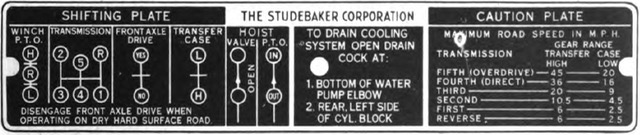
Dump truck w/winch shift patterns

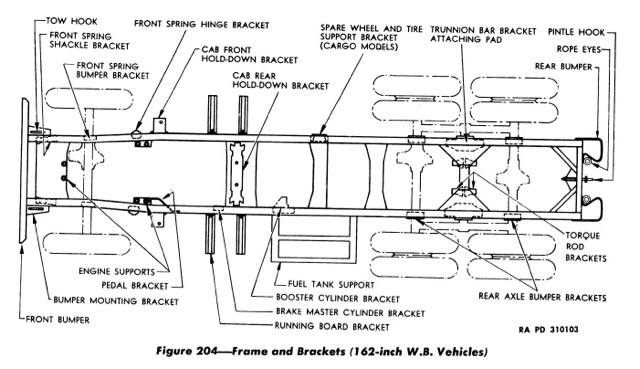
Long wheelbase frame

The US6 used a Hercules JXD engine, with a 320 cu in (5.2 L) L-head inline 6 cylinder gasoline engine developing 86 hp (64 kW) at 2,800 rpm and 200 lb⋅ft (271 N⋅m) of torque at 1,150 rpm. A conservative-type and highly-reliable engine with a compression ratio of only 5.82:1, it could use 68-octane gasoline. This same engine was also used in the M3 Scout Car and, later, M8 Greyhound and M20 armoured cars (the latter was a variant (lacking the gun turret) of the M8 Greyhound).

The Warner T 93 5-speed transmission had a very low first, a direct fourth and an overdrive fifth gear. A power take-off could be fitted to operate a winch (mounted just below in front of the radiator) and/or the hydraulic hoist on dump trucks. (Note: More specifically, the U10/U11 and U12/U13 dump truck models.)

The Timken T-79 transfer case had high and low ranges, a neutral position and could either engage or disengage the front axle. There was one output shaft mounted forward to the front axle (not used in 6×4 trucks) and two to the rear, with one for each rear axle.

Both front and rear axles were of the Timken split-type with a ratio of 6.6:1. The front axle had ball-type constant-velocity joints while the two at the rear were full-floating.

=== Chassis ===
The US6 had a ladder frame with three beam axles, the front on semi elliptical leaf springs, the rear tandem on quarter elliptical leaf springs with locating arms.

There were two wheelbases, the short 148 inches (3.76 m), used in semi tractors, dump trucks, and short cargo models, and the long 162 inches (4.11 m), used in tankers, long cargo models, and the U9 chassis cab. (Note: Measurements are from the centerline of the front axle to the centerline of rear bogie.) All models had 7.50-20" tires and dual rear tires. 6×4 models, intended for on-road use only, were rated at 5 short tons (4,500 kg), twice the 6×6's off-road rating.

=== Cab ===
The US6 carried the design of Studebaker's M series civilian truck cab, although it was modified for military use. Studebaker trucks were different from other 2 1/2 6×6 trucks built for the war effort of the UA because vent windows were included in each door. These vent windows were separate from the main window that rolled down into the door-frame and could be swung out to help with the truck cab's ventilation.

Studebaker also designed the open-type military truck cab which was featured on the GMC CCKW (later models), but their major customer, the USSR, preferred the closed cab for their generally harsh (cold-weather) climate. While Studebaker's open-type truck cab became the American standard, production of the US6 with the closed-type truck cab was restarted after only 10,000 units of the former.

== Models ==
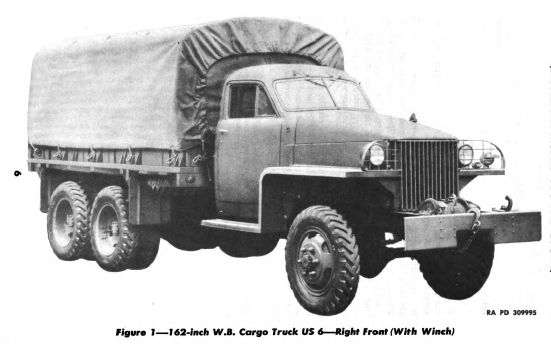
Cargo U4

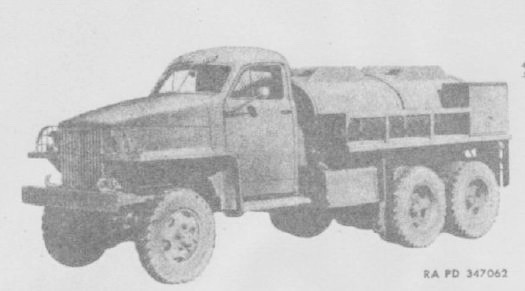
Tank U5

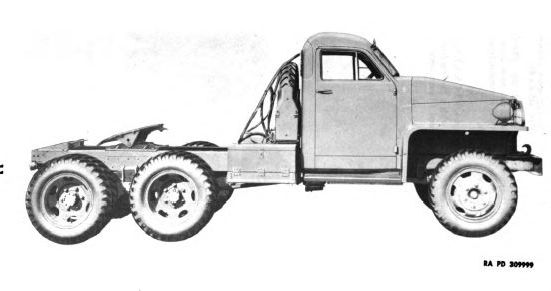
Tractor U6

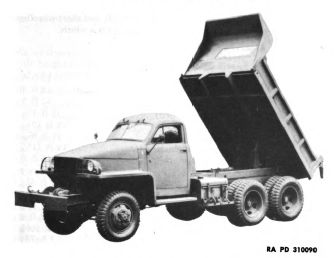
Dump U11

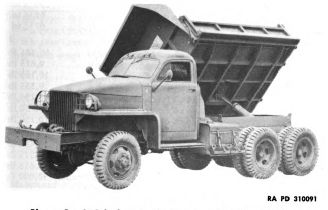
Dump U13

The U1 and the U2 cargo trucks (which had a frontally-mounted winch) had a short wheelbase and the spare tire was mounted behind the cab, thus allowing a truck-bed measuring only 9 ft (2.74 m) long. These "prime mover"-style bodies were not a success as the US6 was to be mainly used for transporting cargo.

The U3/U4 and the 6×4 U7/U8 cargo trucks had a longer wheelbase, which allowed the spare tire to be mounted under the 12 ft (3.66 m) truck-bed. 197,000 trucks with the 12 ft (3.66 m) truck-bed were built.

The U5 tank truck had a long wheelbase and a two-compartment 750 U.S. gal (2,800 L) tank mounted on the truck-bed. Tanker trucks were not equipped with winches.

The 6×4 U6 semi-tractor was the only semi-tractor version in the entire US6 truck series. Semi-tractors have limited off-road performance and, therefore, the U6 was rated for a 5-ton load on improved roads. For this same reason, they had no frontally-mounted winch.

The U9 cargo truck had a long wheelbase and lacked a frontally-mounted winch. The Soviet Katyusha multiple rocket launcher could be mounted on their truck-beds (most of the US6 trucks in Red Army service were of the U9 model).

The U10/U11 (end-type) and the U12/U13 (side-type) dump trucks had a short wheelbase. Both types had the dump-body mounted on a sub-frame at the rear of the truck, with the end-type dump having a hydraulic cylinder attached to the chassis with a lever arrangement while the side-type dump had the hydraulic cylinder mounted directly to the truck body.

== Dimensions ==
Model	Wheelbase	Length (Note: With winch, add 1 ft 3 in (0.38 m).)	Width	Height	Weight empty (Note: With winch, add 610 lb (280 kg).)
U1 Cargo (U2 with winch)	Short	20 ft 11 in (6.38 m)	7 ft 4 in (2.24 m)	8 ft 10 in (2.69 m) (Note: To cargo area tarpaulin bows.)	9,875 lb (4,479 kg)
U3 Cargo (long) (U4 with winch)	Long	27 ft 11 in (8.51 m)	7 ft 4 in (2.24 m)	8 ft 10 in (2.69 m)	
U5 Tank	Long	20 ft 11 in (6.38 m)	7 ft 4 in (2.24 m)	7 ft 3 in (2.21 m) (Note: To top of cab.)	10,585 lb (4,801 kg)
U6 Tractor	Short (6×4)	17 ft 3 in (5.26 m)	7 ft 3 in (2.21 m)	7 ft 2 in (2.18 m)	8,190 lb (3,710 kg)
U7 Cargo (long) (U8 with winch)	Long (6×4)	27 ft 11 in (8.51 m)	7 ft 4 in (2.24 m)	8 ft 10 in (2.69 m)	
U9 Cab/chassis	Long		7 ft 3 in (2.21 m)	7 ft 3 in (2.21 m)	
U10 End dump (U11 with winch)	Short	18 ft 9 in (5.72 m)	7 ft 4 in (2.24 m)	7 ft 7 in (2.31 m) (Note: To top of dump body cab shield.)	10,150 lb (4,600 kg)
U12 Side dump (U13 with winch)	Short	18 ft 11 in (5.77 m)	7 ft 4 in (2.24 m)	7 ft 7 in (2.31 m)	10,150 lb (4,600 kg)

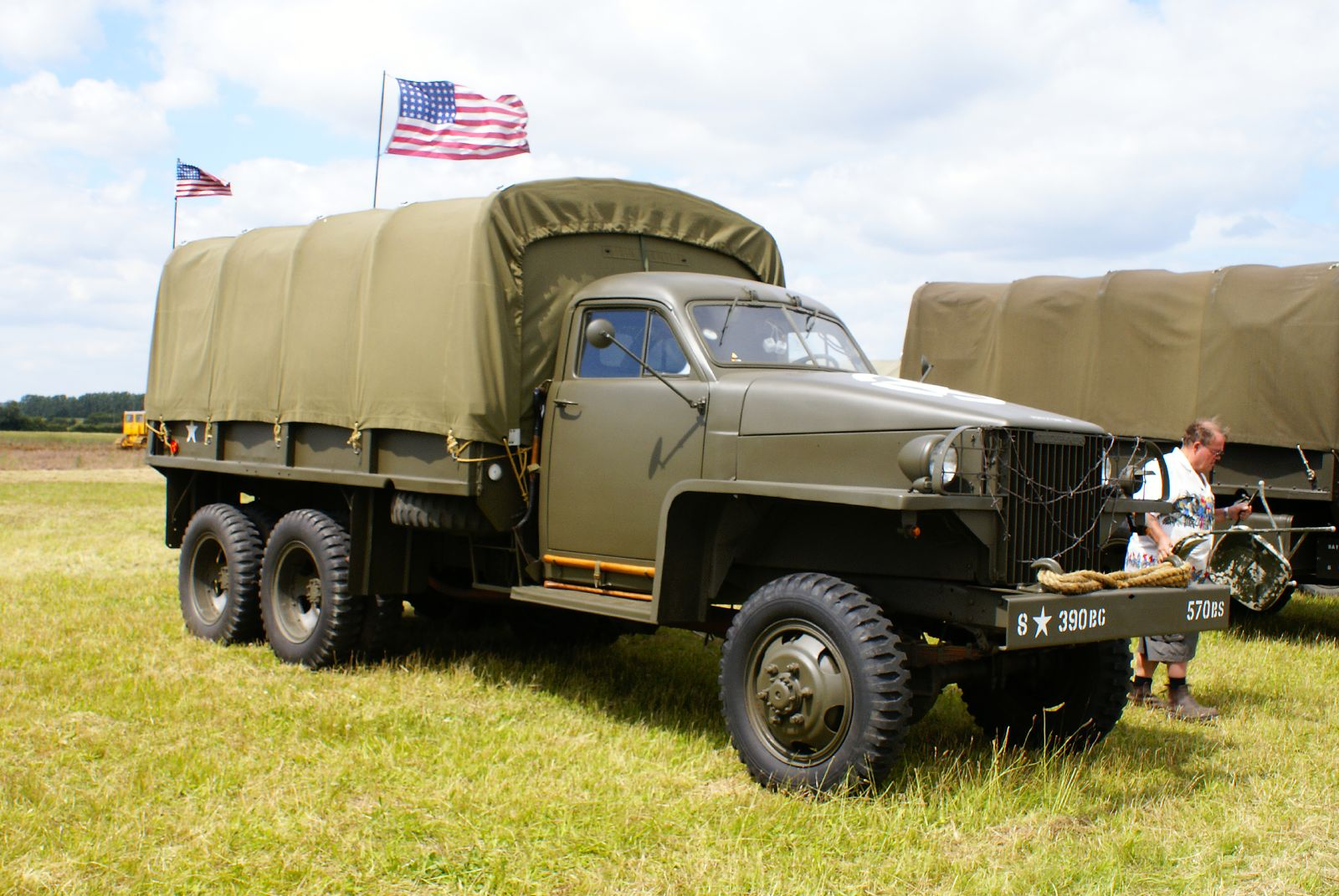
Cargo truck
(Privately owned and fully restored)

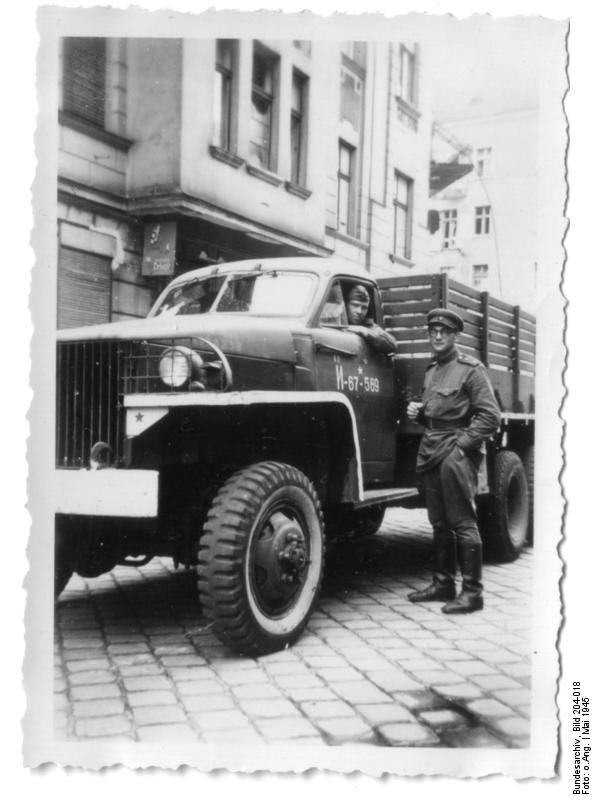
Cargo truck
(in Berlin, May 1945)

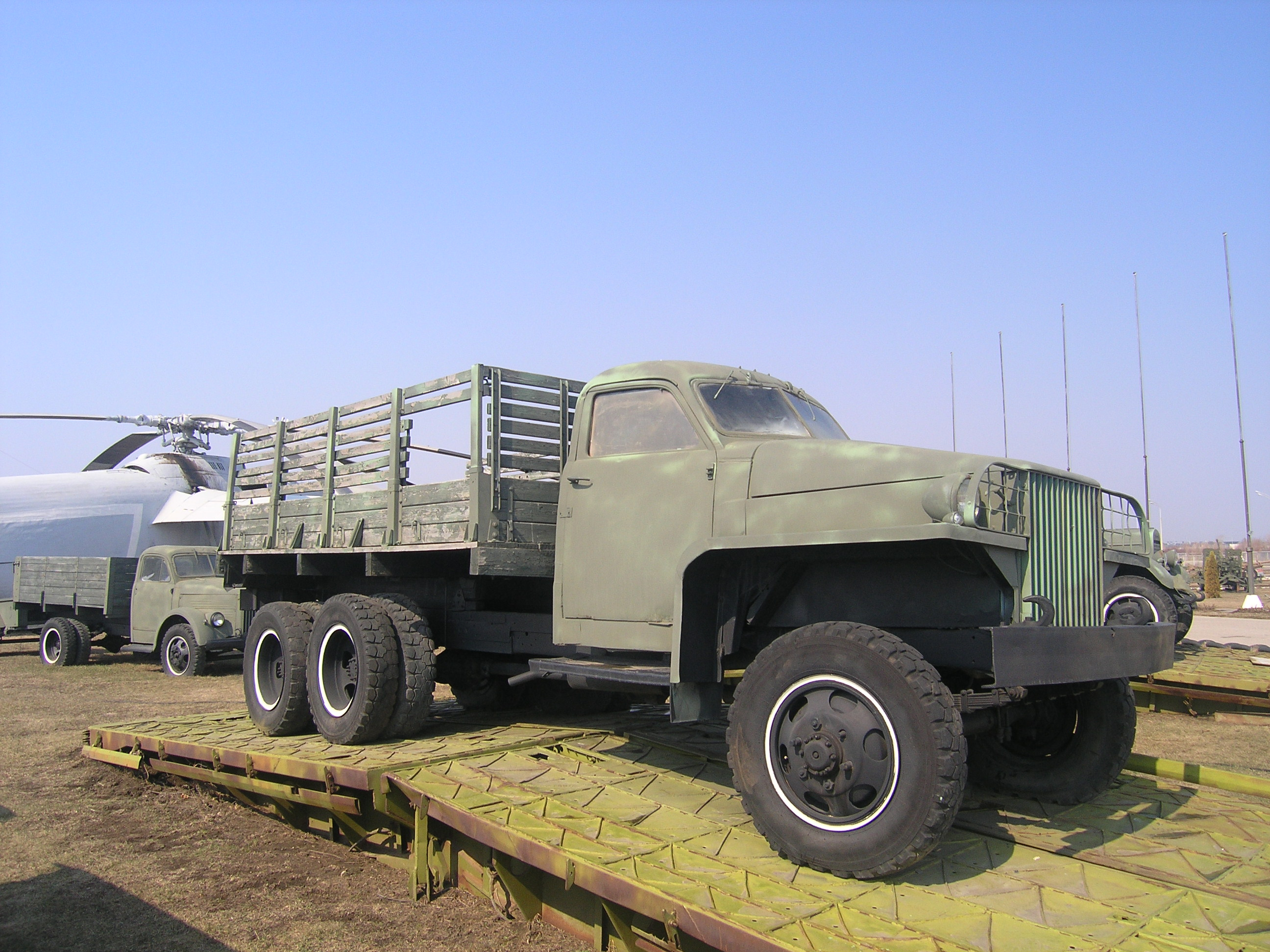
Cargo truck
(Museum exhibit)

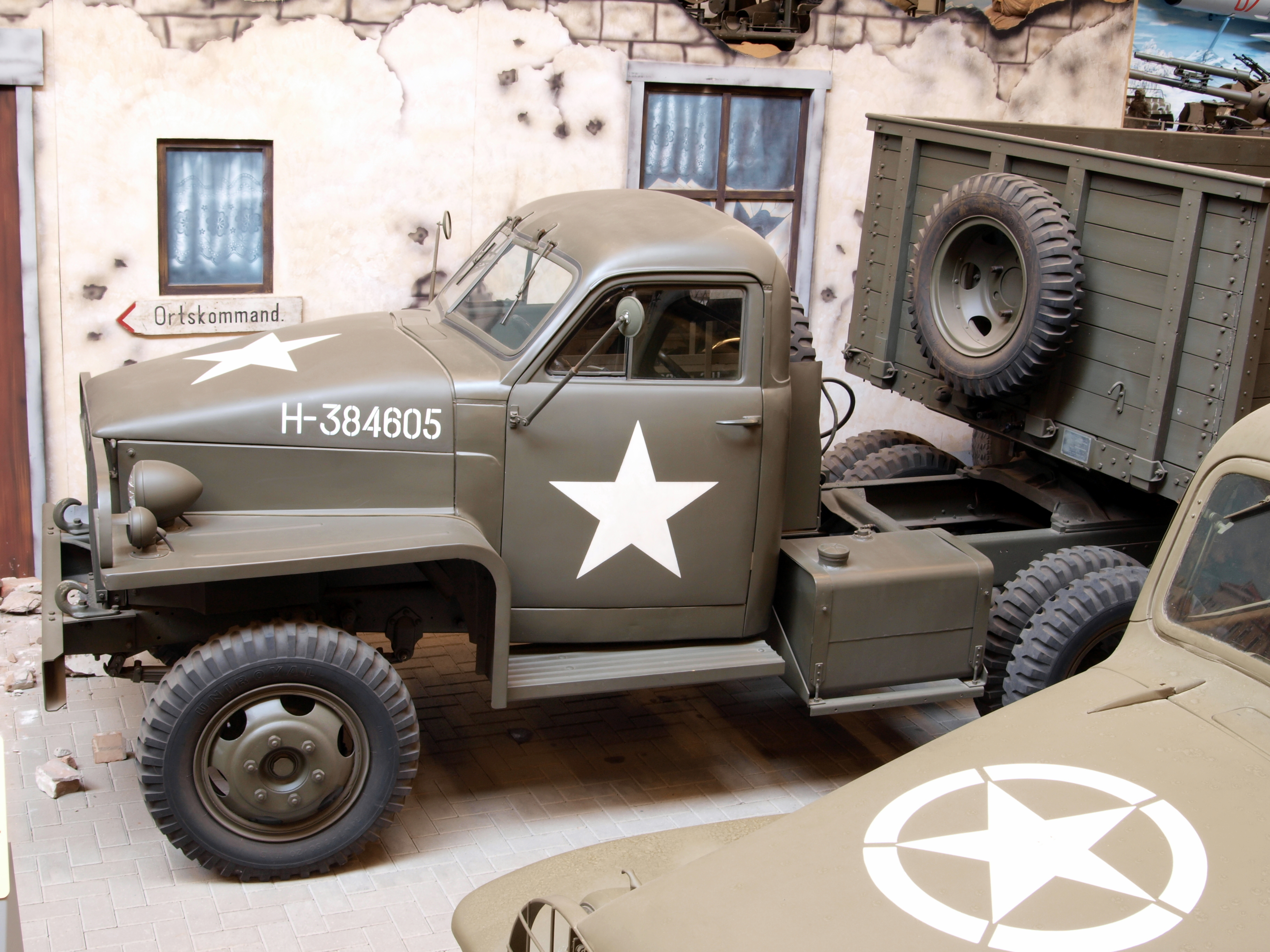
Tractor-semitrailer
(Museum exhibit)

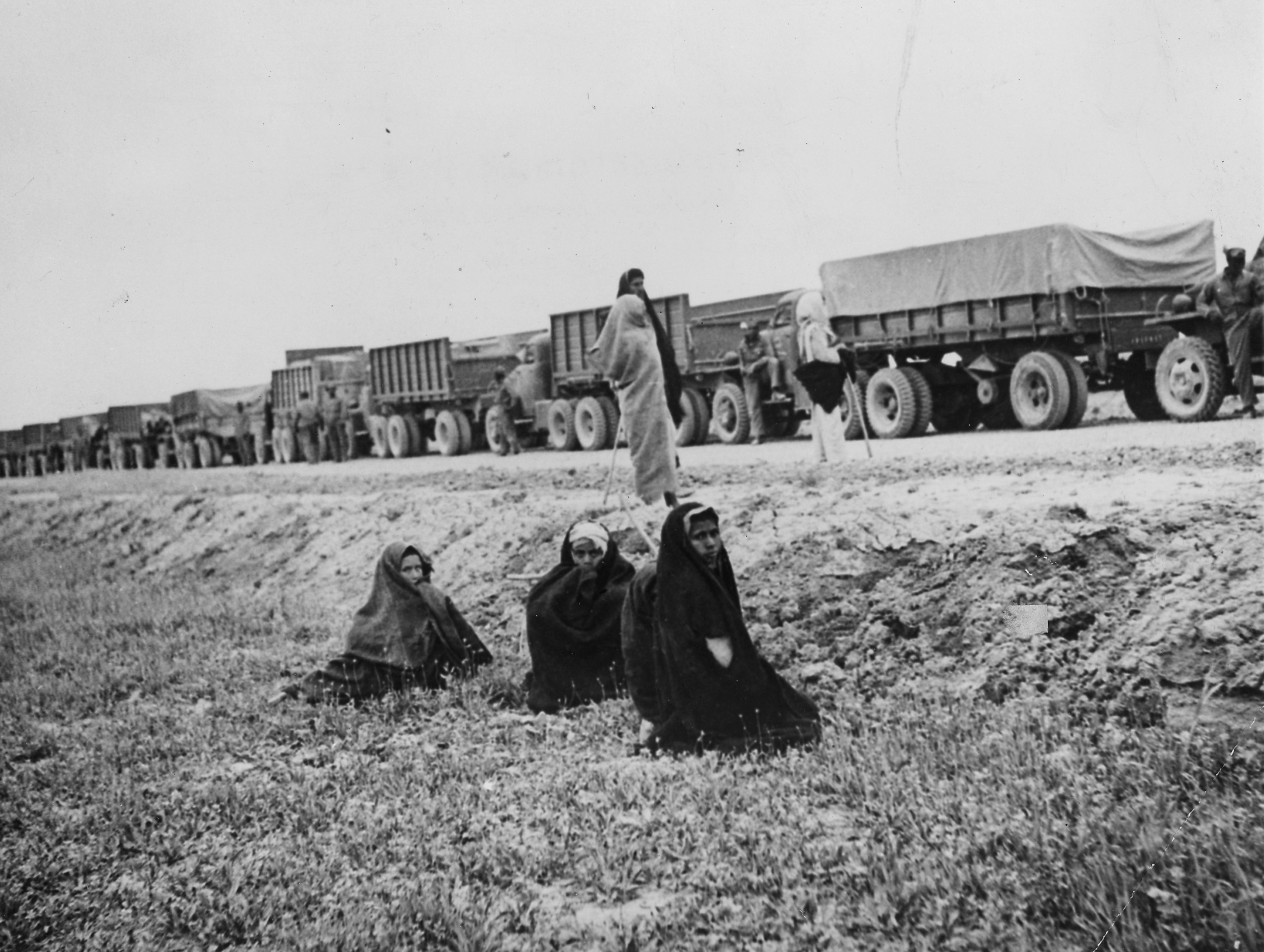
Tractor-semitrailers
(along the Persian Corridor, some time in 1943)

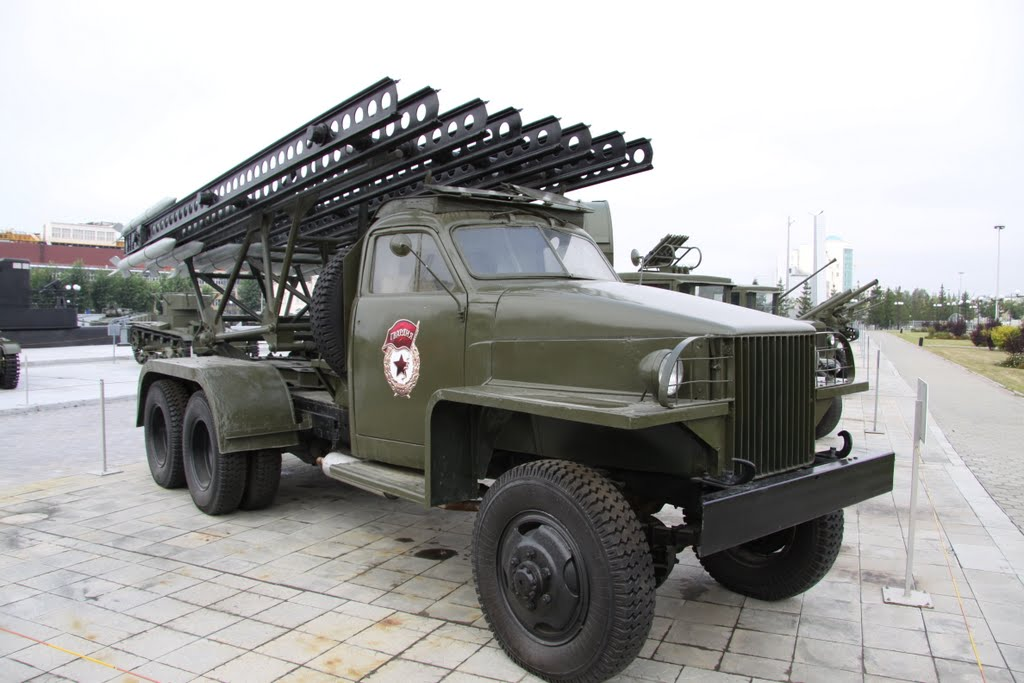
Katyusha mobile-type multiple rocket launcher (Museum exhibit)

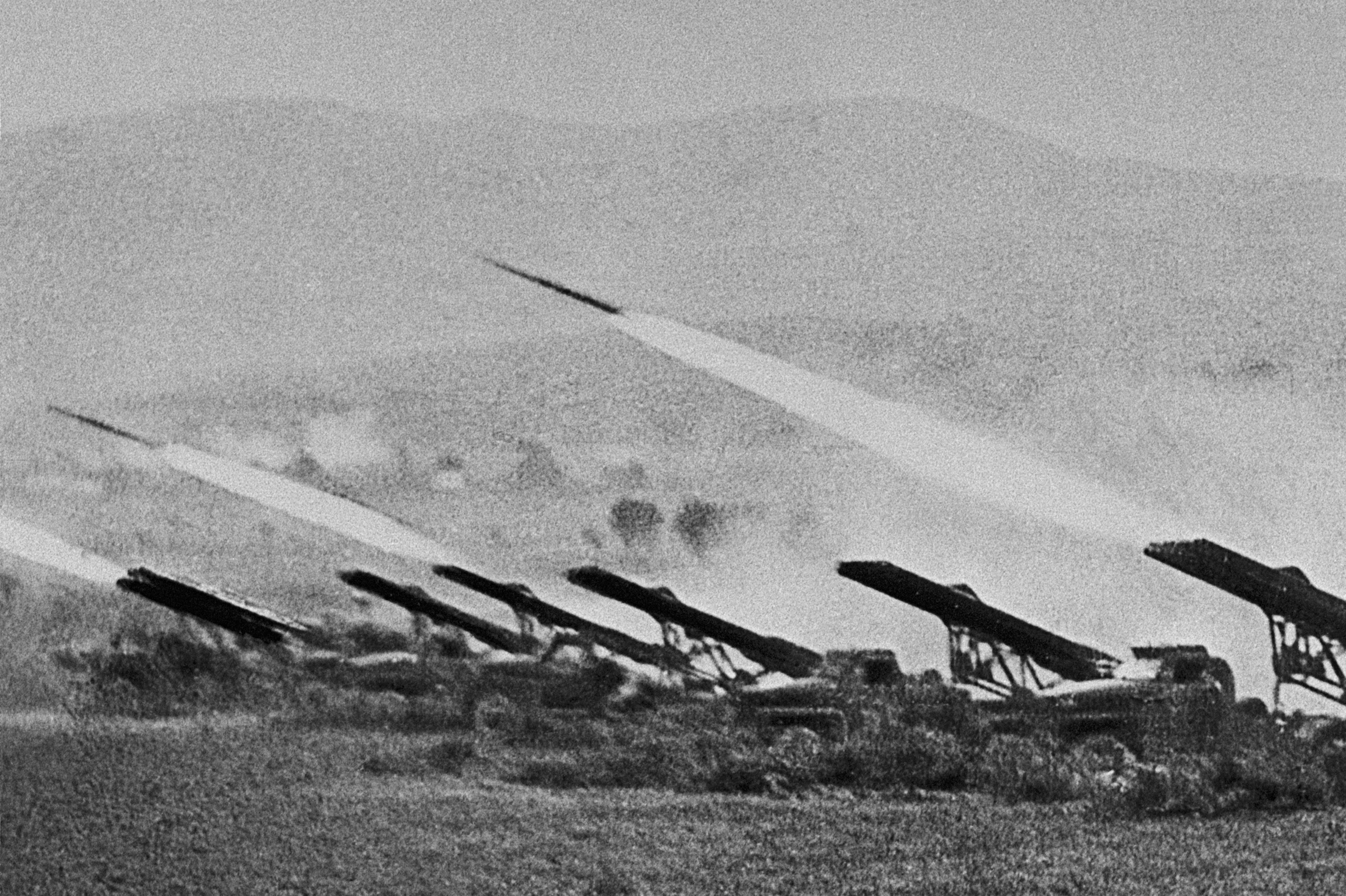
A battery of Katyusha MRLS firing
(at Stalingrad, some time in 1942)

== Legacy ==
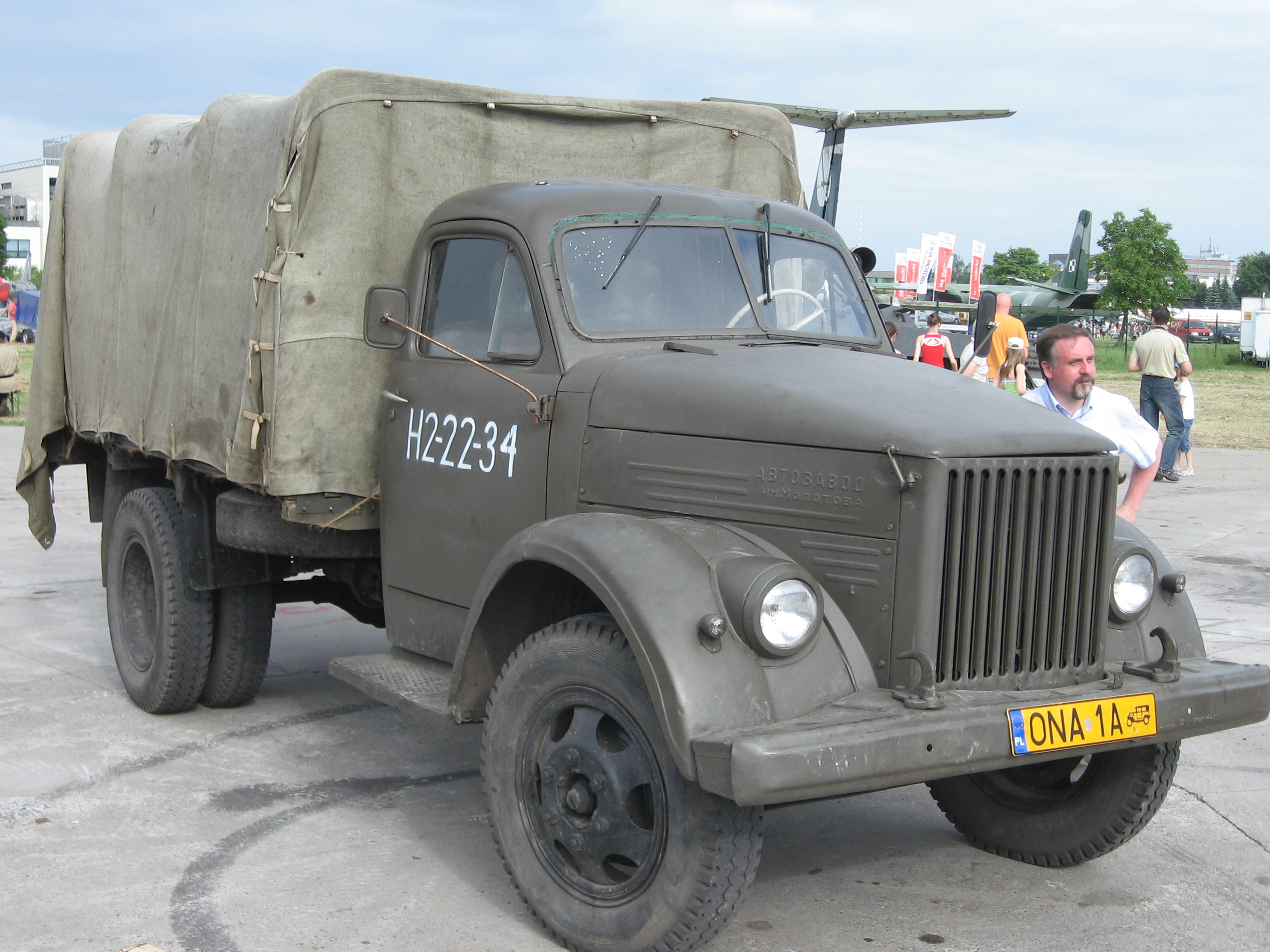
A GAZ-51 truck

Some Studebaker US6 trucks that were shipped to the Soviet Union during WWII were used by GAZ to study and built their own new post-war model based on it, the GAZ-51 truck, which would use the cab and front end of the Studebaker model, albeit in a slightly modified form. This truck would eventually undergo mass production in 1946. The construction of the Studebaker US6 also strongly influenced the construction of the postwar ZIS-151 truck, which then evolved into the ZIL-157 truck and remained in production up until 1994.

The Studebaker US6 truck became a legendary vehicle with its Soviet operators at the time and was called the "King of Roads" by soldiers due to their reliability and dependability, and is still popular in Russian vehicle-collector circles and clubs. In the United States, these trucks are seen as the symbol for the Lend-Lease program to the USSR.

== See also ==
- List of the United States military vehicles by supply catalog designation
- List of the United States military vehicles by model number
- GMC CCKW 2 1/2-ton 6×6 truck
