= MNM =

MNM may refer to:

== Entertainment and media ==
- MNM (professional wrestling), an American wrestling stable
- Mutants & Masterminds (MnM), a pen-and-paper role-playing game
- Radio MNM, a Flemish radio station

== Standardised codes ==
- Mapena language, spoken in Papua New Guinea (ISO 639:mnm)
- Menominee-Marinette Twin County Airport, United States (IATA and FAA: MNM)

== Other uses ==
- Master of Nonprofit Management, a post-graduate degree
- Makkal Neethi Maiyam, an Indian political party in Tamil Nadu
- Maternal near miss, an event risking a pregnant woman's life
- Merchant Navy Medal for Meritorious Service, United Kingdom

== See also ==
- M&M (disambiguation)
- Eminem (born 1972), American rapper
