= M Train =

M Train or M-Train may refer to:

- M>Train, a former operator of half of Melbourne's suburban railway network and a former Melbourne tram service (2001–2004)
- M (New York City Subway service)
- MTR M-Train EMU or MTR Metro Cammell EMU, metro rolling stock of Hong Kong
- Train M, a former service of Helsinki commuter rail
- M Train (book), a 2015 book by Patti Smith
- The MTrain Tour, Meghan Trainor's second tour

== See also ==
- M-Bahn, a former Berlin magnetic levitation train (1989–1991)
- M line (disambiguation)
- M (disambiguation)
