= MM =

MM or variants may refer to:

== Arts, entertainment, and media ==
=== Music ===
- MM (album), 1989, by Marisa Monte
- Maelzel's metronome, a music marking
- Marilyn Manson, an American musician
- Marshall Mathers, an American rapper (a.k.a. "Eminem")
- Mother Mother, a Canadian band
- Master of Music, an academic degree
- Melody Maker British music publication
- "MM", a 1993 song by Mr. President
- Major Moment, an American rock music band from Boston, Massachusetts

=== Television ===
- MM (TV channel), Bulgaria
- The Tomb of the Cybermen, a 1967 Doctor Who serial (production code MM)

=== Other media ===
- MM!, a Japanese light novel, manga and anime series by Akinari Matsuno
- Media Molecule, a video game developer in England
- Monster Manual, a 1977 Dungeons & Dragons source book
- Mother's Milk (character), aka "MM", a fictional character in The Boys comicbook franchise

== Businesses and organizations ==
- MM (TV channel), Bulgaria
- Maryknoll, a Catholic religious institute
- Maybach-Motorenbau and Maybach-Manufaktur and Mercedes-Maybach, an engine and car marque
- Mayr-Melnhof, Austrian packaging company
- Media Molecule, a video game developer in England
- Middle-market company or mid-market companies have annual revenues of $50 million to $1 billion or between 100 and 1000 employees
- Moderation Management, an alcohol support group
- Mumbai Magicians, a defunct Hockey India League franchise
- Leipzig Trade Fair, whose logo reads "MM", an abbreviation for Mustermesse (English: sample fair)
- Peach Aviation (IATA code: MM)
- SAM Colombia (former IATA code: MM)

== Degrees, honorifics, and titles ==
- Machinist's Mate in the US Navy
- Master mariner
- Master of Management, a degree
- Master of Medicine, a degree
- Master of Music, a degree
- Military Medal, British and Commonwealth
- Minister Mentor, a Singapore cabinet position
- messieurs, a plural honorific in French

== Places ==
- Metro Manila, the Philippines' national capital region
  - Mega Manila, its larger metropolis
- Myanmar (ISO 3166-1 country code: MM)

== Science, technology, and mathematics ==
=== Computing ===
- .mm, Internet country code top-level domain for Myanmar
- ".mm", the file extension for FreeMind and Freeplane data files
- ".mm", the file extension for source code files of Objective-C++
- mm tree, the Andrew Morton's Linux kernel tree
- MM algorithm, an iterative method for constructing optimization algorithms
- Columbia MM, an early e-mail client
- Multiple master fonts
- Mattermost, an online chat service

=== Units of measurement ===
- Megametre (Mm) (rare) 1,000 km
- Mile Marker (MM)
- Millimetre (mm)
- Millimolar (mM), a unit of concentration of a solution
- Momme, a unit of textile measurement
- One million (MM), used in reference to currency
- Percent concentration by mass (m/m%, %m/m, or m%), a unit of relative mass concentration
- m.m., a measured mile, when distinct from a computed mile (c.m.)

=== Other uses in science, technology, and mathematics ===
- Middle Minoan, an archaeological period
- Minimax or maximin, a decision rule
- Mischmetal, alloy of similar lanthanoids
- Modified Mercalli scale for earthquake intensity
- Molecular mechanics, computational chemistry technique
- Moving magnet, phonograph cartridge type
- Moving mean, in statistics
- Multiple myeloma, blood cancer

== Other uses ==
- 2000 (number), in Roman numerals
- The year 2000, in Roman numerals
- Mutatis mutandis ("m.m."), Latin expression meaning "with things changed that should be changed"
- MM (New York City Subway service), a former New York City Subway service
- Meitei Mayek, the writing system of Meitei language

== See also ==
- M (disambiguation)
- M2 (disambiguation)
- 2M (disambiguation)
- MMS (disambiguation)
- M&M (disambiguation)
- MMM (disambiguation)
