= M&M Studios =

Dubbing studio

M&M Studios was a dubbing and subtitling studio established in 1986, in Caracas, Venezuela. The studio was originally called Estudios LAIN And Other name Meta & Modular Traducción Visual. They have worked with some of the most important names in the industry, including: Nickelodeon Latin America, MTV, Sony, AXN, Animax, Chello Latin America (formerly MGM Networks Latin America), A&E Networks, CCI Entertainment, Inti Networks, BBC Latin America and Cinemania, among others.

Currently, they offer dubbing into Neutral Spanish and Brazilian Portuguese, as well as open subtitles and closed captions in both languages. M&M Studio has offices in Caracas, Venezuela. It had other offices in Monterrey, Mexico and Miami, Florida, United States. They also have partners in São Paulo, Brazil. The studio closed operations in 2012 and 2013.

== Animated cartoons dubbing (Warner Bros., Disney, MTV, YouTube, Hanna-Barbera) ==
- .hack//Legend of the Twilight
- Baby Baachan
- Basilisk
- Black Cat
- Bokurano
- Burst Angel
- Matantei Loki Ragnarok
- Dear Boys
- Di Gi Charat Nyo!
- DNA²
- Excel Saga
- Fairy Tail
- Fate/stay night
- Fullmetal Alchemist
- Galaxy Angel
- Gantz
- GetBackers
- Gankutsuou
- .hack//SIGN
- Hell Girl
- Humanoid Monster Bem
- I'm Gonna Be An Angel!
- Last Exile
- Martha Speaks
- Mushishi
- Noir
- Pinky Dinky Doo
- Pita Ten
- Planet Survival
- R.O.D. the TV
- Samurai 7
- S-CRY-ed
- Solty Rei
- Speed Grapher
- Steel Angel Kurumi
- Stratos 4
- Trinity Blood
- Tsukihime
- Twin Spica
- The Twelve Kingdoms
- Vandread
- Vandread: The Second Stage
- Wow! Wow! Wubbzy!
- Wolf's Rain
- xxxHOLiC

== Nickelodeon ==
- Danny Phantom
- My Life as a Teenage Robot
- Tak and the Power of Juju
- As Told by Ginger
- Fanboy & Chum Chum
- The Mighty B!
