= Militzer & Münch =

International transportation and logistics service provider

M&M Militzer & Münch International Holding AG
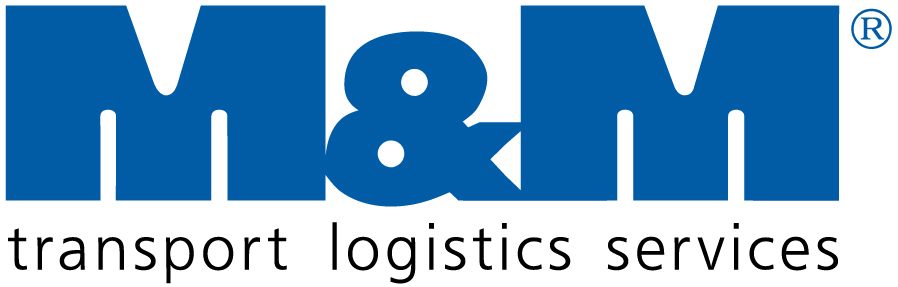
- Company type: Private
- Industry: Logistics Services Provider
- Founded: in Hof, Germany, 1880, by Richard Militzer and Werner Münch
- Headquarters: St. Gallen, Switzerland
- Key people: Michael Albert (Chairman of the Board of Directors), Ingo Seifert (Board Member), Guillaume de Laage de Meux (Board Member and Regional Managing Director South West Europe/Maghreb), Frank Müller (Board Member), Nikolaus Kohler (Regional Managing Director MECA), Sacho Todorov (Regional Managing Director Central Europe), Andreas Löwenstein (Regional Managing Director Asia/Far East) Holger Seehusen (Group Manager Air & Sea)
- Number of employees: ca. 2,300
- Website: mumnet.com

M&M Militzer & Münch is an international transportation and logistics service provider, with the headquarter based in St. Gallen in Switzerland.

Its network consist of more about 100 branch offices in nearly 40 countries.

Militzer & Münch today offers its services worldwide with an own setup in Western and Eastern Europe, in Central Asia, Northern Africa, and Asia / Far East.
