= Mister M =

Mister M, Mr M, Mr. M, may refer to:

- Mister M (character), a Marvel Comics character
- Val Valentino, magician known as Mister M
- Mr. M (album), a 2012 album by Lambchop
- "Mr. M", a 2004 single by Four Day Hombre

== See also ==
- The Mysterious Mr. M, a 1946 movie serial by Universal Studios
- MRM (disambiguation)
