= Studebaker M-series truck =

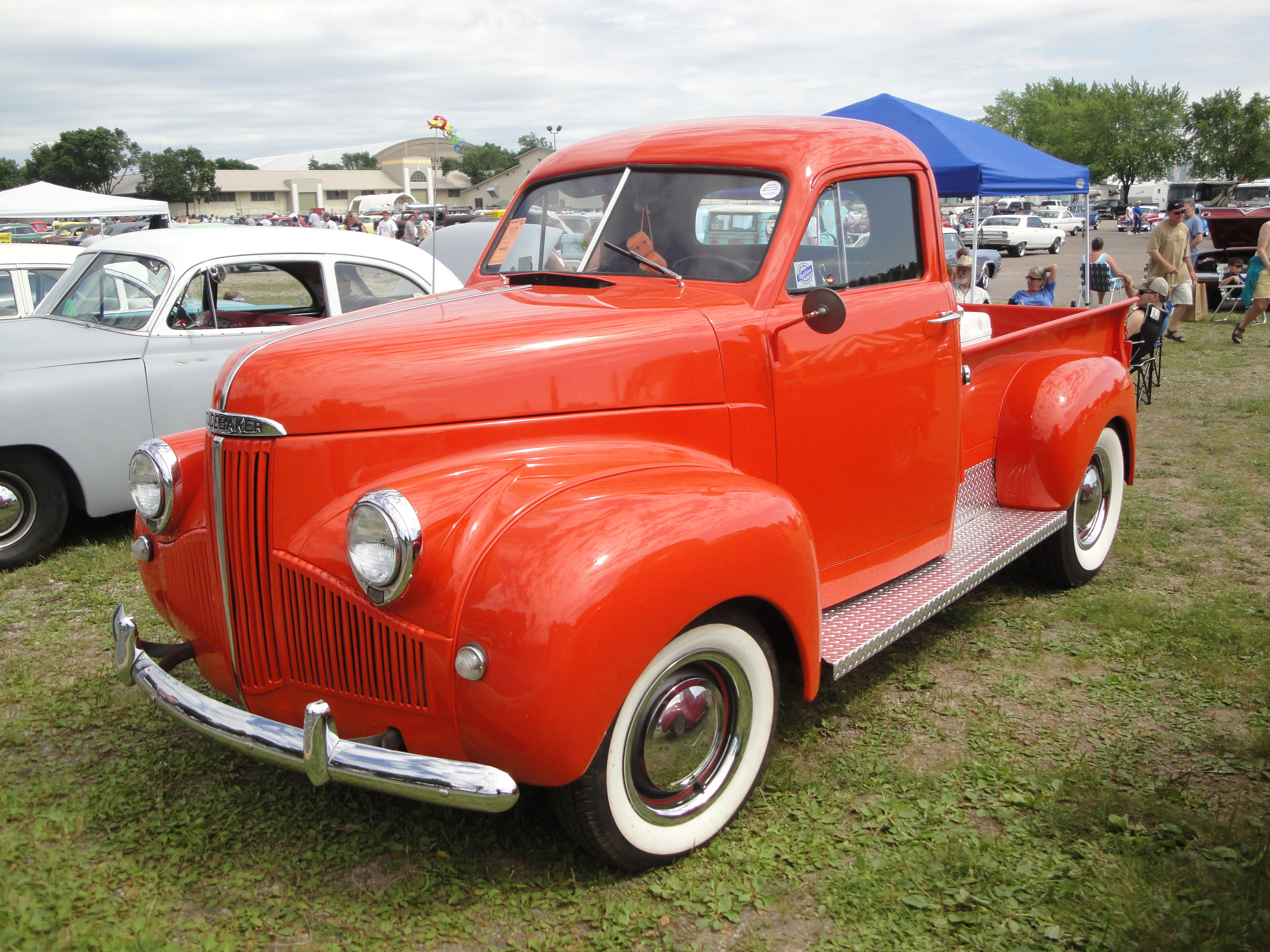
- 1946 Studebaker truck

Overview
- Manufacturer: Studebaker
- Production: 1938–1949

Body and chassis
- Body style: 2-door pickup
- Layout: Front engine, rear-wheel drive / four-wheel drive

Powertrain
- Engine: 169 cu in (2.8 L) I6; 226 cu in (3.7 L) I6

Dimensions
- Wheelbase: 2,847–4,956 mm (112.1–195.1 in)
- Length: 4,799–5,980 mm (188.9–235.4 in)
- Width: 1,998–2,200 mm (78.7–86.6 in)
- Height: 1,890 mm (74.4 in)
- Curb weight: 1,259–3,050 kg (2,776–6,724 lb)

Chronology
- Predecessor: Studebaker Coupe Express
- Successor: Studebaker 2R/3R

The Studebaker M-series is a pickup truck series designed in the late 1930s by the Studebaker Corporation.

== Production ==
The M-series Studebaker trucks came in several versions both pre and post WW II. The M-5 was a 1/2 ton truck, available in a pickup configuration as well as a cab and rolling chassis. The M15 was the 3/4 ton version. The M15A was the one & 1 1/2-ton version. The M5, M15, and M15A all came with the Champion 169 ci. engine only. The M16 1-1/2 & 2 ton versions came with the more powerful Commander 226 ci. engine. The Studebaker US6 version was produced during the war to government specifications; using a different nose and engine configuration, in both a 4x6 & 6x6 versions of a 2 1/2-ton truck. In early 1945, Studebaker was given permission to produce some M Series trucks for civilian use.

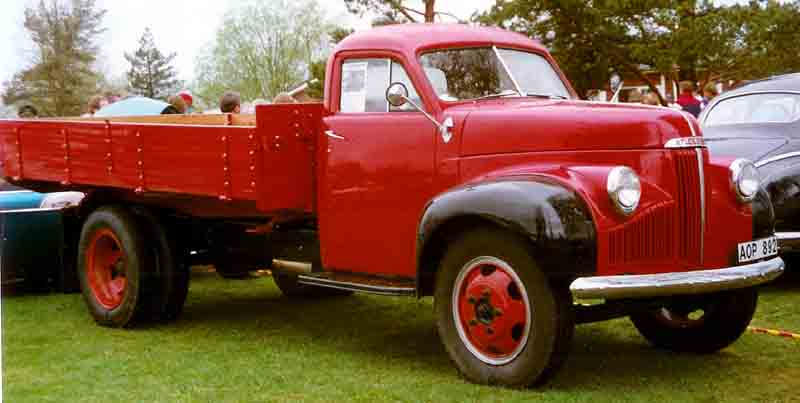
1948 Studebaker M16 52A truck

Like most truck lines, the Studebaker M Series trucks could be had in any number of body styles. While only pickup beds were offered on the M5, M15, & M15A versions from the factory, combination cab and rolling chassis were sold, allowing custom truck body manufacturers to variously sell standard beds and boxes or custom fabricate them to an owners specifications.

While the M16 version used the larger Commander 226 ci. engine, through the use of a different fire wall on these cabs, all the other front sheet metal stayed the same. However, a spacer was used in the front fenders to accommodate the larger front wheel track of the M16.

The M series truck range was produced from 1939 to 1942, when civilain production was stopped due to the Second World War and restarted in 1945, continued until 1949. Based on the Studebaker M16, the company designed the Studebaker US6 6x4 and 6x6 military trucks, which differed only in that they had a new engine, a new front end and all-wheel drive.

== Design and specifications ==
The M series sported a more aerodynamic shape than most trucks of the time, with easily recognisable "wind wing" vents on the driver and passenger windows, a feature not found on any other make of American truck during World War II. When Studebaker introduced the M-series pickup truck in 1941, the company used the Coupe Express name from its 1937–1939 Coupe Express coupe utility of in advertising for a time; no M-series trucks were ever officially designated as the Coupe Express.

Engine	The M5, M15, & M15A versions came only with the Champion 169 ci, engine. The Commander “Big Six” 226 ci, engine w/ 6 blade shrouded fan was used only in the M16 version.
Transmission	T9 crash box 4 speed w/ drum emergency brake
Tire size	8.25 x 20”
Wheelbase	113" on M5 with 120", 128" & 152” on M15, M15A, & M16; a 195" was available on the M16 as well.
