= La Grande Station =

Former Santa Fe Railway stop, Los Angeles

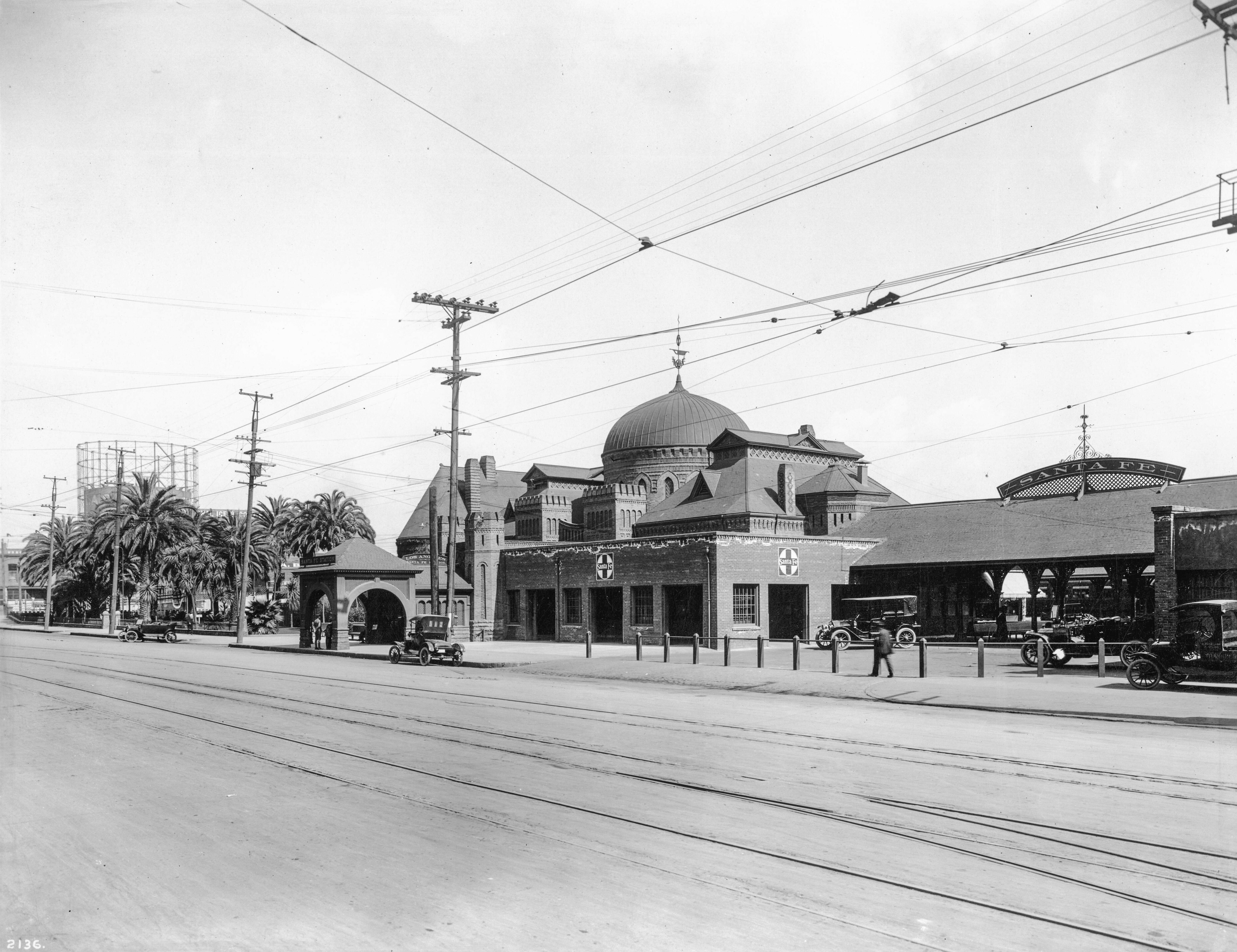
- La Grande Station c. 1911

General information
- Location: 2nd Street and Santa Fe Ave; Los Angeles, California
- Coordinates: 34.0472°N 118.2322°W
- Owner: Atchison, Topeka and Santa Fe Railway

Construction
- Platform levels: 1

History
- Opened: July 29, 1893; 133 years ago
- Closed: May 3, 1939; 87 years ago

Former services
| Preceding station | Atchison, Topeka and Santa Fe Railway | Following station |
|---|---|---|
| Terminus | Main Line | Pasadena toward Chicago |
| Rivera toward San Diego | Surf Line | Terminus |
| Redondo Junction toward Redondo Beach | Redondo Beach Branch | Terminus |
Location

La Grande Station, or Sante Fe Station, was the Atchison, Topeka and Santa Fe Railway's main passenger terminal in Los Angeles, California from 1893 until the opening of Union Station in 1939. The station was located at 2nd Street and Santa Fe Avenue on the west bank of the Los Angeles River, just south of the First Street viaduct built in 1929.

Designed by an unknown architectural firm, they sought to capture a blend of styles that included Mission Revival, Spanish Colonial, Art Deco, and Moorish influences. Visually, the structure created a unique aesthetic mix, reflecting Los Angeles' diverse history and cultural heritage.

== History ==
Santa Fe opened La Grande Station on July 29, 1893. The station was unique for Southern California with its Moorish-inspired architecture. Los Angeles Railway Yellow Cars called at the street adjacent to the station by 1920, and was at different times served by the N, 7, and 9 lines.

Heavy damage from the 1933 Long Beach earthquake meant the last operating years of the station were spent in a state of disrepair as portions of the building, including the dome, had to be removed for the safety of passengers. When Union Station opened in 1939, Santa Fe moved all of its passenger services there.

Despite the closure, it was used as a staging ground for the Internment of Japanese Americans in Los Angeles. La Grande Station was demolished in 1946.

== In popular culture ==
Many Hollywood movies were filmed at the stylish station. Laurel and Hardy's film Berth Marks (1929) was one of the first sound movies shot on location. Other movies that used Santa Fe's La Grande Station included Choo-Choo! (1932) (Our Gang — Little Rascals), Lady Killer (1933) with James Cagney, Swing Time (1936) with Fred Astaire, and Something to Sing About (1937).

== Gallery ==
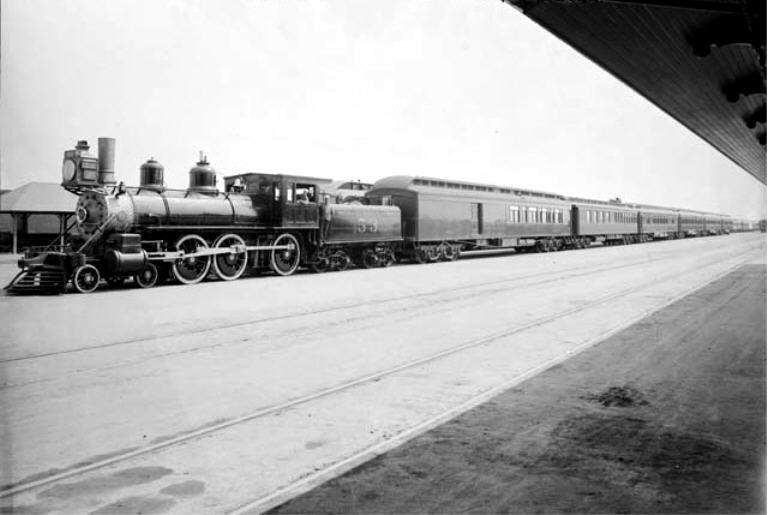
The California Limited, led by engine No. 53 c. 1899.

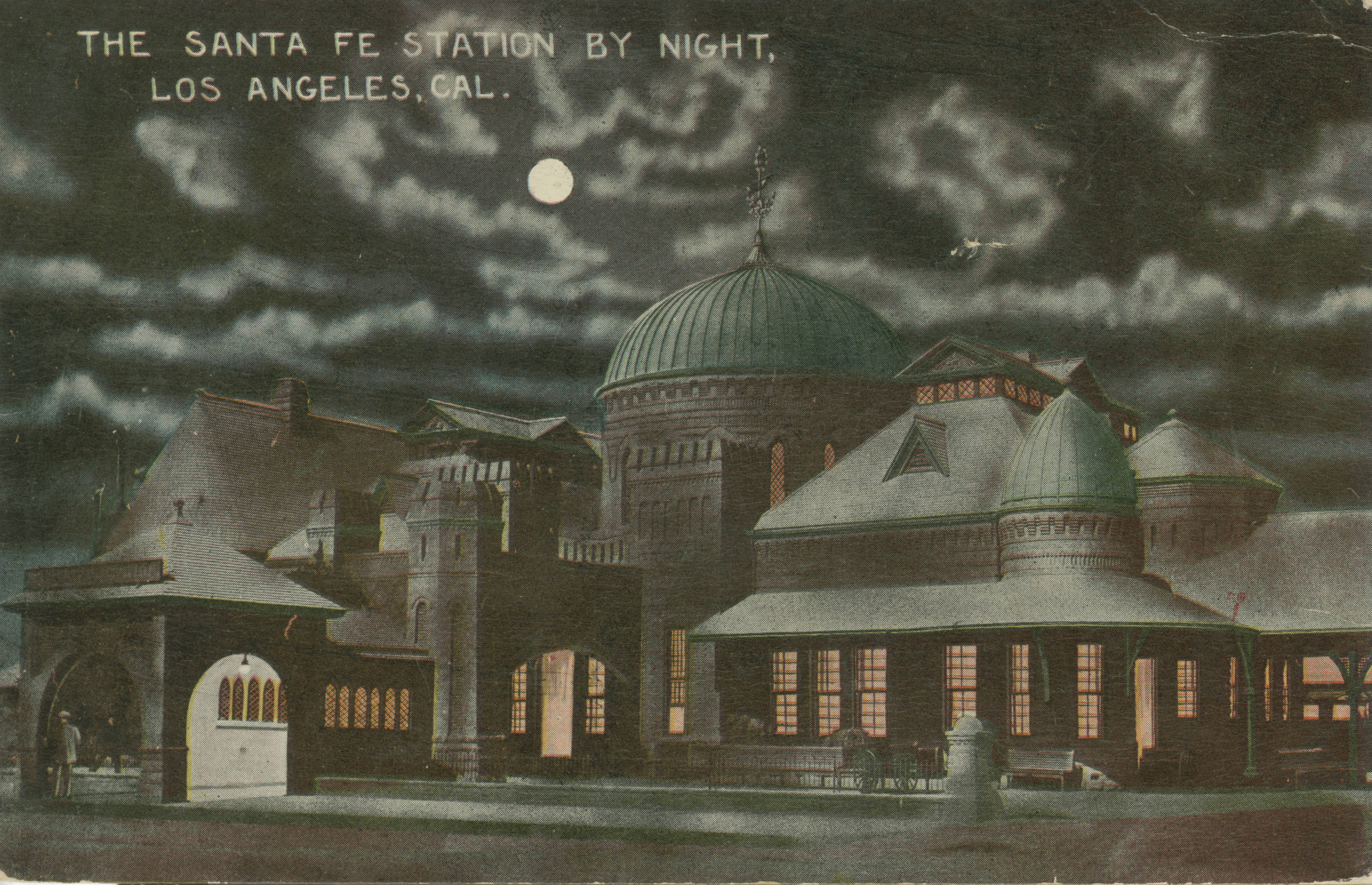
Night view c. 1915

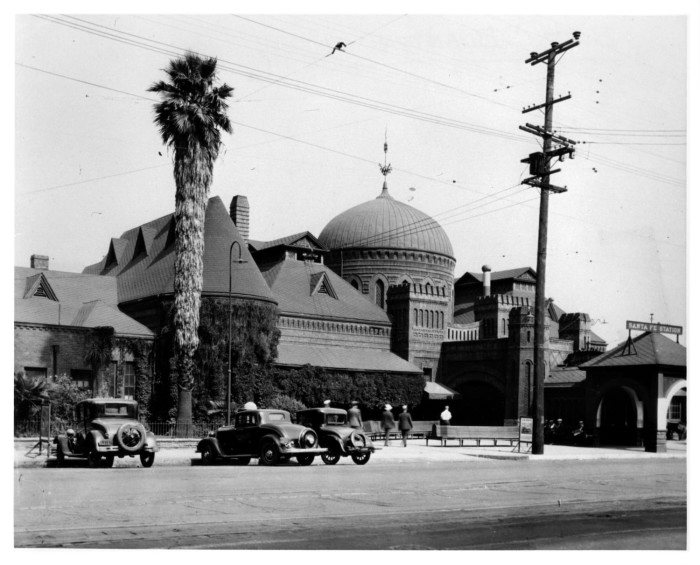
Day view c. 1930s

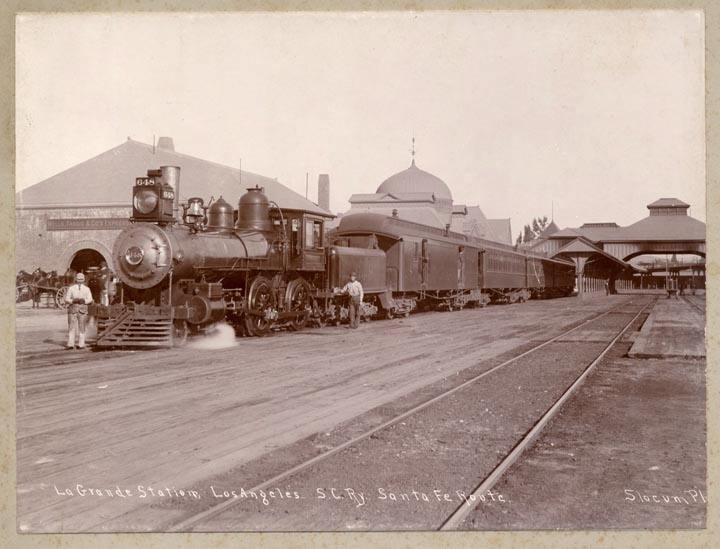
Trackside Day view

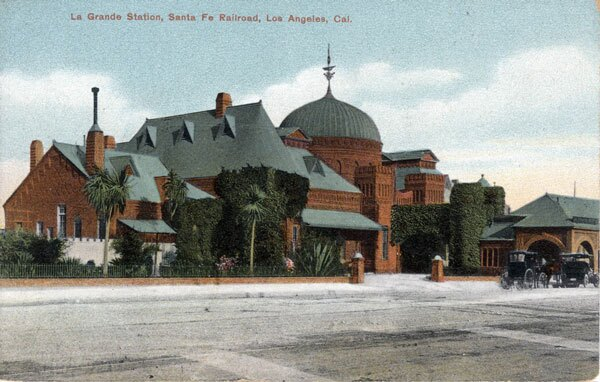
Station Postcard
