= M2 (Brisbane) =

Road route in Brisbane, Australia

Coordinates: 27°34′54″S 152°45′35″E

The (M2) in Brisbane, Queensland, Australia, is a major motorway route and southern bypass of Brisbane. It connects the Warrego Highway (A2) at Brassall to the (M1) at Eight Mile Plains via the following corridors:

- (M2) Northern Ipswich Bypass (Warrego Highway) from Brassall to Dinmore
- (M2) Ipswich Motorway from Dinmore to Gailes
- (M2) Logan Motorway from Gailes to Drewvale
- (M2) Gateway Motorway from Drewvale to Eight Mile Plains

== Major intersections ==
Each of the articles on the component roads contains a road junction list.
