= 10 (Los Angeles Railway) =

10 refers to two streetcar lines in Los Angeles, California. They operated by the Los Angeles Railway for a combined period from 1932 to 1946.

== First 10 (1932–1942) ==
10

Overview
- Locale: Los Angeles
- Termini: Douglas Street and Kensington Road; Vernon and Arlington Avenues

Service
- Type: Streetcar
- System: Los Angeles Railway

History
- Opened: June 12, 1932
- Closed: November 30, 1942

Technical
- Track gauge: 3 ft 6 in (1,067 mm)
- Electrification: Overhead line, 600 V DC

The route started in 1932 as a combination of two former lines: the M on Arlington Avenue and the A Line Broadway segment. It ran from Vernon and Arlington in the south to Lincoln and Mission in Lincoln Heights. In 1939 the Broadway line was reassigned to the W and service was rerouted all the way to the Edgeware line in Angelino Heights, but this was cut back to 39th on New Year's Day 1943. At the time of its closure, the route ran from Grand Avenue and 39th Street to the intersection of Vernon and Arlington Avenues, by way of Grand Avenue, Santa Barbara Avenue, Dalton Avenue, and Vernon Avenue. The service ended on November 30, 1942; the Edgeware Road Line continued to operate as a shuttle, designated number 37, until mid-1946.

== Second 10 (1943–1946) ==
10

Overview
- Locale: Los Angeles
- Termini: Santa Barbara and Normandie Avenue Vermont Avenue and W. 39th Street (peak hours); Vernon and Arlington Avenues

Service
- Type: Streetcar
- System: Los Angeles Railway

History
- Opened: June 21, 1943
- Closed: January 17, 1946

Technical
- Track gauge: 3 ft 6 in (1,067 mm)
- Electrification: Overhead line, 600 V DC

Map of Los Angeles Railway Lines, 1943–1946 incarnation of the 10 shown in grey

A wholly new route was assigned the number 10 on June 21, 1943, running over Vernon, Dalton, and Santa Barbara and extending to Vermont and 39th at rush hours. This 10 ran until January 27, 1946, when it was converted to bus operation.
