= 7 (Los Angeles Railway) =

Streetcar route (1932–1955)

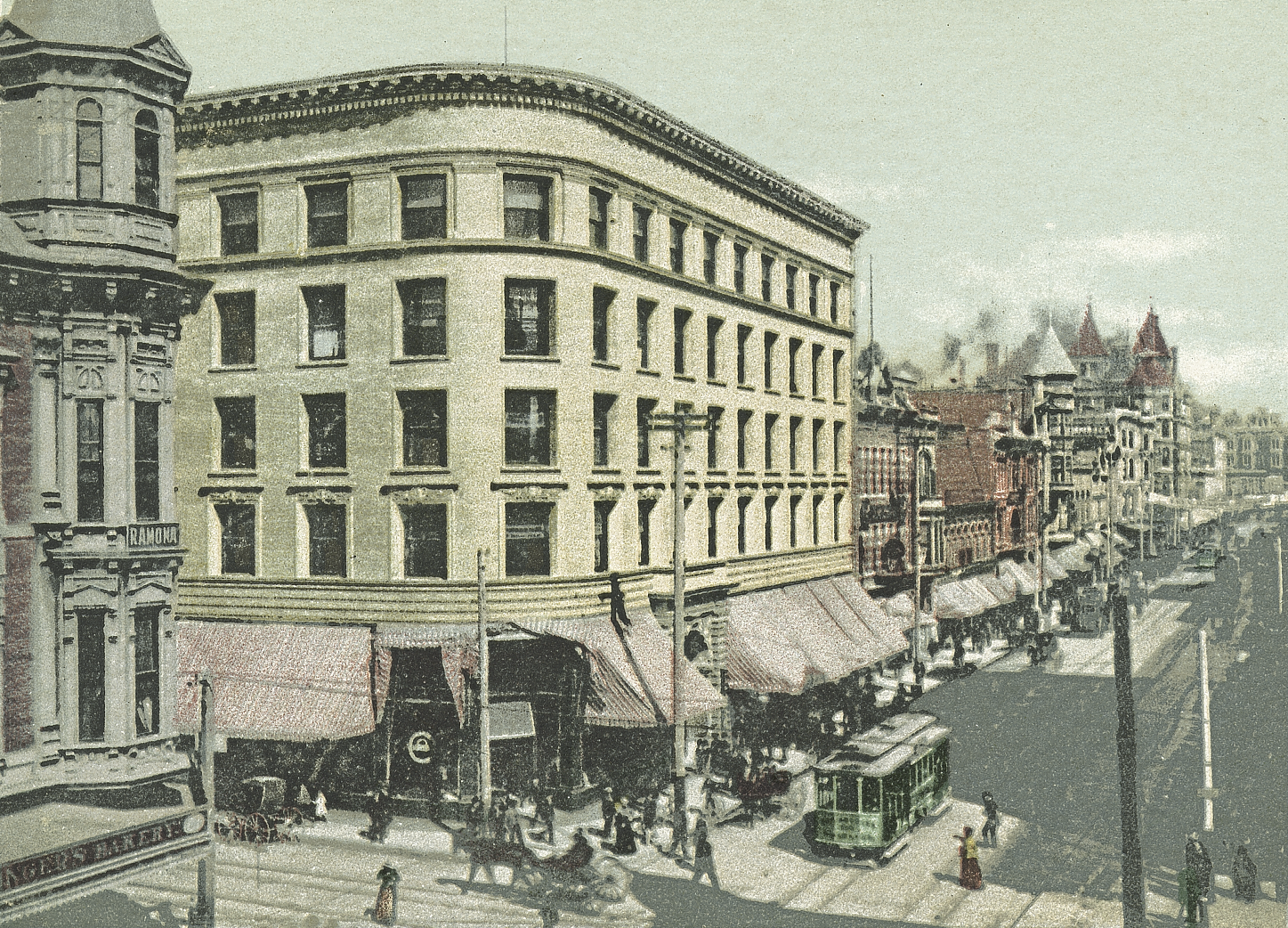
- Postcard of Spring Street, c. 1904

Overview
- Owner: Los Angeles Railway
- Locale: Los Angeles
- Termini: Spring and 2nd Street; Athens Way and 116th Street
- Stations: 26

Service
- Type: Streetcar
- System: Los Angeles Railway
- Daily ridership: 18,285 (1940)

History
- Opened: June 12, 1932
- Closed: May 22, 1955

Technical
- Track gauge: 3 ft 6 in (1,067 mm)
- Electrification: Overhead line, 600 V DC

7 was a streetcar line in Los Angeles, California. The service was operated by the Los Angeles Railway from 1932 to 1955. It ran from Spring and 2nd Streets to Athens and 116th Street, by way of Spring Street, Main Street, Broadway Place, Broadway, and Athens Way. During its Los Angeles Transit Lines days, around 1950 to 1955, Line 7 was rerouted (or detoured) off South Broadway to Central Avenue, at least as far north as 7th Street across Olympic Boulevard to possibly Vernon Avenue, covering trackage that was abandoned rail by line U, when that line was converted to trolley bus August 3, 1947.

== South Broadway Line (1932–1934) ==
Geographic map; 7 is in green

7 was formed from the South Broadway branch of the M Grand and Moneta Avenue Line, and the Santa Fe Depot branch of the N West 9th Street and Santa Fe Depot Line. Service began on June 12, 1932. The route of the line was West 116th Street and Athens Avenue, north on Athens, South Broadway, South Broadway Place, Main and Spring Street to West 2nd Street, southeast on 2nd to Traction Avenue to E. 3rd Street, east on 3rd to Santa Fe Avenue, and north on Santa Fe to the Atchison, Topeka and Santa Fe Railway depot at East 2nd Street.

== South Broadway & Civic Center Line (1934–1955) ==
On November 11, 1934, the line rerouted and renamed the 7 South Broadway and Civic Center Line. This line ran from 116th Street and Athens Avenue, north on Athens, South Broadway, South Broadway Place, Main, and Spring Streets to Sunset Boulevard. Tracks to the Santa Fe Depot were transferred to the 9 Line. On September 12, 1948 terminus cut back to Temple and Spring Streets due to the building of the Hollywood Freeway. On May 5, 1955, the rail service was abandoned.

== Final operations ==
The public saw the automobile and the newly expanding freeway system in Southern California as the preferred and more convenient method of travel. Streetcar service on the line was discontinued May 22, 1955 and the route was converted to bus operation.
