= Anti-Aircraft Target Rocket M2 =

M2
- Type: Anti-aircraft target rocket
- Place of origin: United States

Service history
- Used by: United States Army

Specifications (M2)
- Mass: 35.1 lb (15.9 kg)
- Length: 4 ft 11.1 in (150.1 cm)
- Diameter: 3.25 in (83 mm)
- Engine: Solid-fuel rocket
- Propellant: solvent extruded double base powder
- Operational range: 1,700 yd (0.97 mi; 1.6 km)
- Boost time: 0.25 sec
- Maximum speed: 560 ft/s (380 mph; 610 km/h)
- Guidance system: None

The Anti-Aircraft Target Rocket M2 was a 3.25-inch (83 mm) rocket developed and used by the United States Army during World War II. It was designed to serve as a training target for anti-aircraft guns, capable of simulating attacks by low-flying aircraft. The nosecone of the rocket was ogival, and it was fitted with oversized fins to aid in tracking of the rocket by trainees.

Shipped with two to three rockets in a package, the Target Rocket Projector M1 was used for the rocket's launching platform. It consisted of a set of launching rails on a two-wheeled trailer and weighed 750 pounds (340 kg); capable of being elevated to 60 degrees, it allowed the rocket to be launched at random angles and directions to increase the effectiveness of the training exercises, and could fire up to two rounds per minute. A modification of the basic rocket, designated as the Anti-Aircraft Training Rocket M2A1, replaced the basic M2 in service; it added a flare that ignited on launch to aid in visual tracking of the target that burned for approximately 30 seconds after launch.
