= 8 (Los Angeles Railway) =

Historical streetcar line in Los Angeles, California (1932–1955)

- Map of the Los Angeles Railway "Yellow Cars" routes

Overview
- Status: Defunct
- Owner: Los Angeles Railway (1932–1945); Los Angeles Transit Lines (1945–1955)
- Locale: Los Angeles, California
- Termini: Spring Street & Temple Street; Mission Road & Selig Place
- Continues from: M line
- Stations: 27

Service
- Type: Streetcar
- System: Los Angeles Railway
- Operator(s): Los Angeles Railway (1932–1945); Los Angeles Transit Lines (1945–1955)

History
- Opened: June 12, 1932
- Closed: May 22, 1955

Technical
- Track gauge: 3 ft 6 in (1,067 mm)
- Electrification: Overhead line, 600 V DC

Line 8 was a streetcar route in Los Angeles, California, operated as part of the Los Angeles Railway "Yellow Car" system from 1932 until its closure on May 22, 1955. It principally served the South Los Angeles corridor, running between Union Station in Downtown Los Angeles and points south, including Crenshaw Boulevard and Mission Road. The line was one of several created in 1932 from the break-up of the former M line, and was discontinued along with several other routes in the major abandonments of May 22, 1955, which also ended lines 5, 7, 9, and F. Upon closure, Line 8 was replaced by bus service.

== Background ==
The Los Angeles Railway, informally known as the "Yellow Cars", was a network of urban streetcar lines serving central Los Angeles. Created in its modern form after purchase by railroad magnate Henry E. Huntington in 1898, the system operated a dense web of routes through the city's core neighborhoods, including Crenshaw, West Adams, Boyle Heights, and Echo Park.

In 1944, the Los Angeles Railway was sold to American City Lines, a subsidiary of a consortium that included General Motors, Firestone Tire, Standard Oil of California, and Mack Trucks. The system was renamed the Los Angeles Transit Lines (LATL). Critics have long argued this acquisition was designed to hasten the conversion of streetcar routes to bus operations.

== History ==
=== Origins: The M line (1917–1932) ===
The trackage that formed the basis of Line 8 originated as the Homeward Avenue Line, which ran along Moneta Avenue and Athens Way. It was incorporated into the consolidated M line (also known as the Grand & Moneta line) during the 1920 restructuring of routes. The M line ran from Crenshaw Avenue and West 54th Street through a circuitous routing through Downtown Los Angeles, splitting at its southern terminus into two branches.

In May 1931, the M line was extended, with tracks on 48th Street extended to Crenshaw. In the following year, the M line was split into multiple distinct services, with the Moneta Avenue branch becoming the foundation of the new Line 8.

=== Line 8 (1932–1955) ===
Line 8 began service on June 12, 1932. The initial route ran from Spring Street and Temple Street, outbound to Manchester Avenue and South Broadway, serving South Los Angeles. The 8 was rerouted shortly after with the rebuilding of Temple Street.

In 1934, the line was significantly rerouted, incorporating part of the former Line 9. The new alignment ran from Spring and Temple Streets to 54th Street and Crenshaw Boulevard, traveling via Spring Street, Main Street, Broadway Place, Broadway, and 54th Street.

During World War II, demand for public transit increased substantially as fuel rationing discouraged private car use. Off-peak service to Los Angeles Union Station was inaugurated in August 1943. Starting in 1946, Line 8 absorbed part of the former N line's trackage to Union Station, enabling full-time service to the terminal.

In 1949, the Union Station tracks were transferred to the revived F line, with Line 8 taking up former F line trackage to Mission Road and Selig Place as compensation, extending its eastern reach toward Lincoln Park.

=== Closure and aftermath ===
On May 22, 1955, Line 8 was abandoned as part of a major LATL service reduction that simultaneously ended Lines 5, 7, 9, and F, as well as the northern portion of the W line. The closure was partly precipitated by the condemnation of a two-mile stretch of South Grand Avenue for construction of the Harbor Freeway, which disrupted LATL's operations significantly.

Following the abandonment, approximately 250 well-maintained H-class and K-class streetcars were declared surplus. Of these, 61 H-class cars were ultimately sold to Seoul, South Korea, rather than being scrapped — a remarkable second life for the retired Yellow Cars.

The last of all Los Angeles streetcar services ended on April 9, 1961. Light rail returned to Los Angeles in 1990 with the opening of the Blue Line (now the A Line), which partly follows the historic Pacific Electric corridor.

== Route ==
During its final years of operation (1949–1955), Line 8 ran the following alignment:

- Eastern terminus: Mission Road and Selig Place
- Via Mission Road, Macy Street, and Los Angeles Street to Downtown
- Via Spring Street, Main Street, Broadway Place, and Broadway southbound
- Via 54th Street to Crenshaw Boulevard
- Western/Southern terminus: 54th Street and Crenshaw Boulevard

== See also ==
- Los Angeles Railway
- Los Angeles Transit Lines
- Streetcars in Los Angeles
- Pacific Electric Railway
- M (Los Angeles Railway)
