= Broadway Tunnel =

The following tunnels are named the Broadway Tunnel:

- Broadway Tunnel (San Francisco) through Russian Hill
- "Broadway Low-level Tunnel" through the Berkeley Hills, now known as the Caldecott Tunnel
- Broadway Tunnel (Los Angeles), a former tunnel under Fort Moore Hill
- Broadway Line (disambiguation), several subway tunnels in New York City
