= Los Angeles High School =

- Official seal of LAHS

Location
- 4650 West Olympic Boulevard; Los Angeles, California 90019; United States
- 34.056°N 118.333°W

Information
- Type: Public, Magnet
- Established: 1873; 153 years ago
- Locale: City, Large
- School district: Los Angeles Unified School District
- NCES District ID: 0622710
- NCES School ID: 062271003151
- Principal: Marguerette Gladden
- Teaching staff: 61.54 (on an FTE basis)
- Grades: 9–12
- Enrollment: 978 (2024–25)
- Student to teacher ratio: 15.89
- Colors: Royal Blue & White
- Athletics conference: Coliseum League; CIF LA City Section
- Team name: Romans
- Alumni: LAHS Alumni Association
- Website: lahigh.org

Los Angeles High School is the oldest public high school in the Southern California region and in the Los Angeles Unified School District. Its colors are royal blue and white and the teams are called the Romans.

Los Angeles High School is a public secondary high school, enrolling an estimated 2,000 students in grades 9–12. After operating on a year-round basis consisting of three tracks for ten years, it was restored to a traditional calendar in 2010. Los Angeles High School receives accreditation approval from the Western Association of Schools and Colleges (WASC). Concurrent enrollment programs, provided in large by the Los Angeles Unified School District and the Los Angeles Community College District, are offered with West Los Angeles College, Los Angeles Trade–Technical College, Los Angeles City College, or Santa Monica College.

Los Angeles High School is a large, urban, inner-city school located in the Mid-Wilshire District of Los Angeles. The attendance boundary consists of a contrasting spectrum of economic diversity ranging from affluent Hancock Park and Lafayette Square to the low-income, densely populated immigrant community of Koreatown. Within the school is a College Incentive Magnet Program. Forty-four percent of the student population is identified as LEP, or Limited English Proficient. Currently, 66% of the students are identified as eligible to receive supplemental instructional services and materials through the Federal Title I Program.

The magnet high school has a university preparatory secondary high school program and a "school within a school." First established as a part of student integration services in the 1970s, the Los Angeles High School Math/Science/Technology magnet prepares students with an intensive, rigorous course load in order to better prepare them for university entrance. There are 317 students enrolled in the magnet program, grades 9-12.

Typically, the senior class has approximately 50% of seniors entering into four-year universities and schools. The magnet senior class typically has 90% of its senior class entering into four-year colleges and universities.

== History ==
=== 1873, Poundcake Hill ===
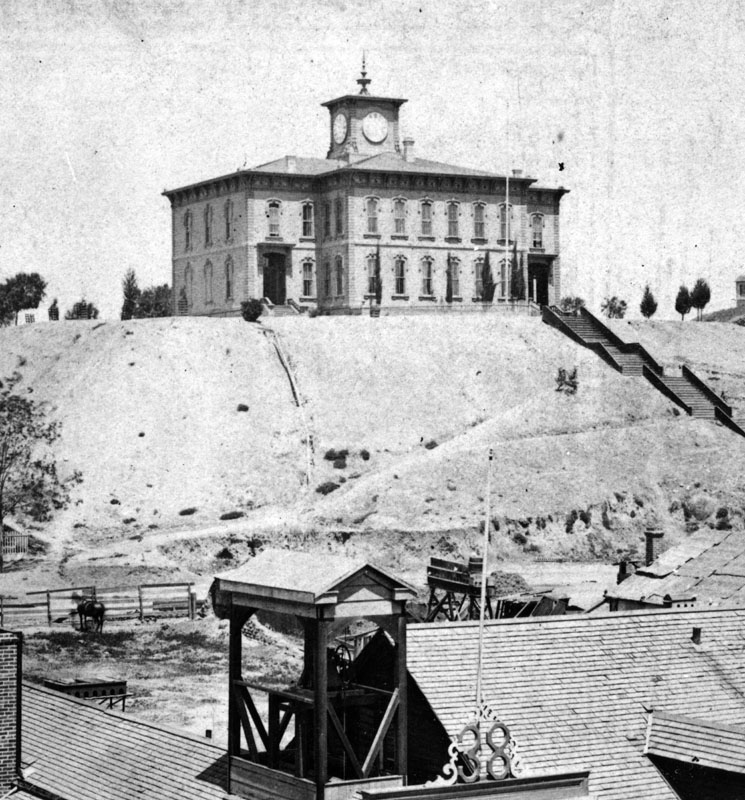
Original LAHS location, on Poundcake Hill, 1873.

Early buildings commissioned to house the Los Angeles High School were among the architectural jewels of the city, and were strategically placed at the summit of a hill, the easier to be pointed to with pride. One of the school's long standing mottos is "Always a hill, always a tower, always a timepiece."

Construction on Los Angeles' first public high school (the private Loyola High School is older) began on July 19, 1872, at the former site of Central School on what was then known as Poundcake Hill, at the southeast corner of Fort Street (later Broadway), which the front of the school faced, and Temple Street, with the back of the school to New High Street (later Spring Street). The approximate coordinates are 34°03′20.44″N 118°14′36.48″W. As it was on the hill, a few hundred feet from the streets below, steep wooden stairways led up to the schoolyard.

The two-story wooden structure was so big and grand, the finest school south of San Francisco at that time, with classic lines and a tower with a clock in it, that people traveled from miles around to see it. The teachers liked the wide corridors, walnut banisters, generous windows and the transoms over the doors.

The schoolhouse was completed at a cost of $20,000 in 1873 (equivalent to $538,000 in 2025). Nearby, in succession, was the Court House, the City Hall, the Jones-Lindley Market and the Post Office. The first principal was Rev. Dr. William T. Lucky (1821–1876) and the first graduating class, in 1875, consisted of seven students. In 1879, a natural science club, the Star and Crescent Society, was founded at LAHS and consisted then of the entire student body. It soon left its specific focus on science and became a de facto student government and organizational body.

=== 1887, Sand Street ===
In 1887, the decision was made to move the high school building to Sand Street (later California Street, now part of the Hollywood Freeway), just to the west of North Hill Street and below the south side of Fort Moore Hill, in order for the Los Angeles County Courthouse to be built on Poundcake Hill. The contractor, Mr. Hickam, said he could do the job with scaffolding, rollers, horses and workmen. But his bid turned out to be too low. He lost a considerable amount of money because of his elaborate preparations, including the high wooden trestle which carried the building over the intersection of Temple and Fort Street. Hickam managed to get the schoolhouse halfway up Temple Street when he ran out of money and left it right in the middle of the street. It was there for a good while. They jacked it up on scaffolding high enough for the Temple Street street cars to run under it. Finally, they got it moved up to its new location on Sand Street, where LAHS students and faculty remained until the second high school was built a few years later.

The original schoolhouse remained at the Sand Street (California Street) site for many years, while in continuous use. After the high school moved out, it became a school for the lower grades. It went completely unharmed by the Long Beach earthquake in 1933, which did a lot of damage to the newer buildings in downtown. By April 1936, nearly 300 children attended school there. The building remained standing and in use by the local school district until 1949, when it was torn down for the construction of the Hollywood Freeway.

=== 1891, Fort Moore Hill ===
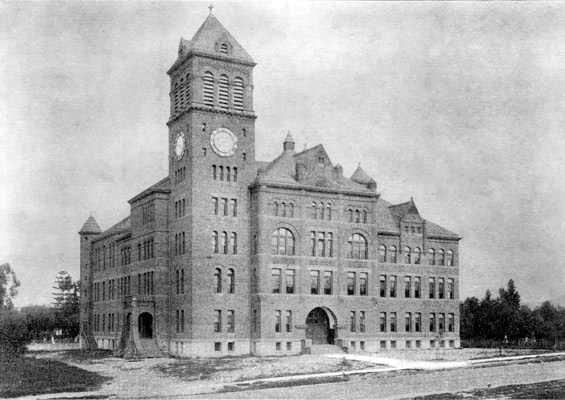
Second LAHS location, on Fort Moore Hill, 1891

In 1890, construction began on a new red brick schoolhouse facing North Hill Street on Fort Moore Hill, between Sand Street and Bellevue Avenue (later Sunset Boulevard, now Cesar Chavez Avenue), at coordinates 34°03′30.39″N 118°14′32.84″W, which was a short distance from the older wooden one then facing Sand Street below. That same year, the Los Angeles City High School District was formed. It served students of LAHS while the Los Angeles City School District and various other elementary school districts served elementary and junior high school students.

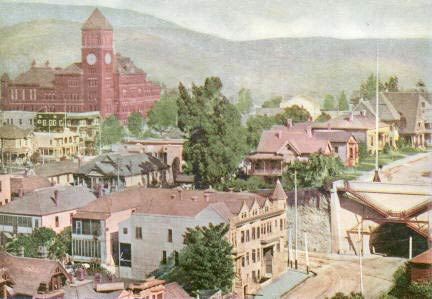
Second location c. 1910s. Broadway Tunnel is to the right

This new building was completed later that year, with a dedication ceremony held on December 30, 1890. It was an enormous building for its time. The new high school was built on part of the site of the abandoned Fort Moore Hill Cemetery, the first Protestant cemetery in Los Angeles, which was spread over the slopes of the hill. It had become neglected, practically unattended and desecrated by grave robbing vandals. The Board of Education purchased the property from the city in 1884, and other portions of land were sold as residential lots. The city neglected to remove the remains and clear away the grave sites and some LAHS students in the 1890s thought it was "fun" to sit and eat their lunch while they leaned against a tombstone.

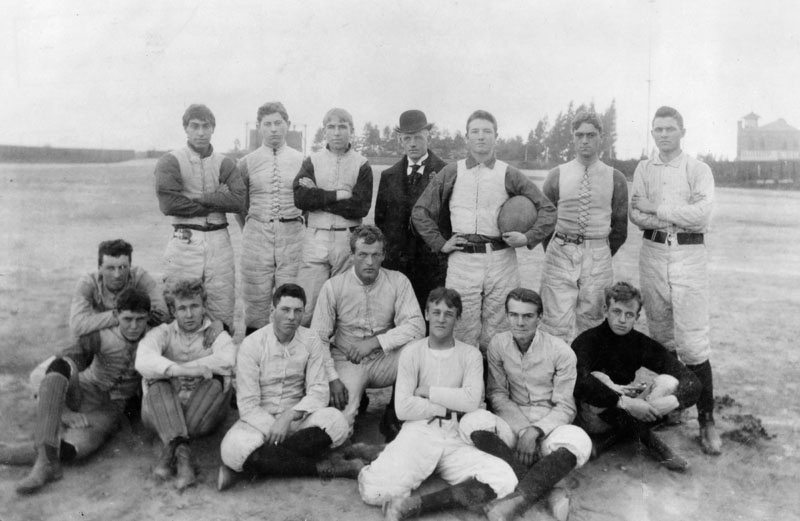
1894 LAHS football team

At a meeting regarding the improvement of the school grounds on June 4, 1896, the committee was directed to wait on the Board of Education the following Monday evening to secure the cooperation of the board in having dirt being taken from the Hill Street cut used in filling up the grounds of the high school, so that shrubbery could be grown about the building. LAHS was the only high school in Los Angeles until 1905.

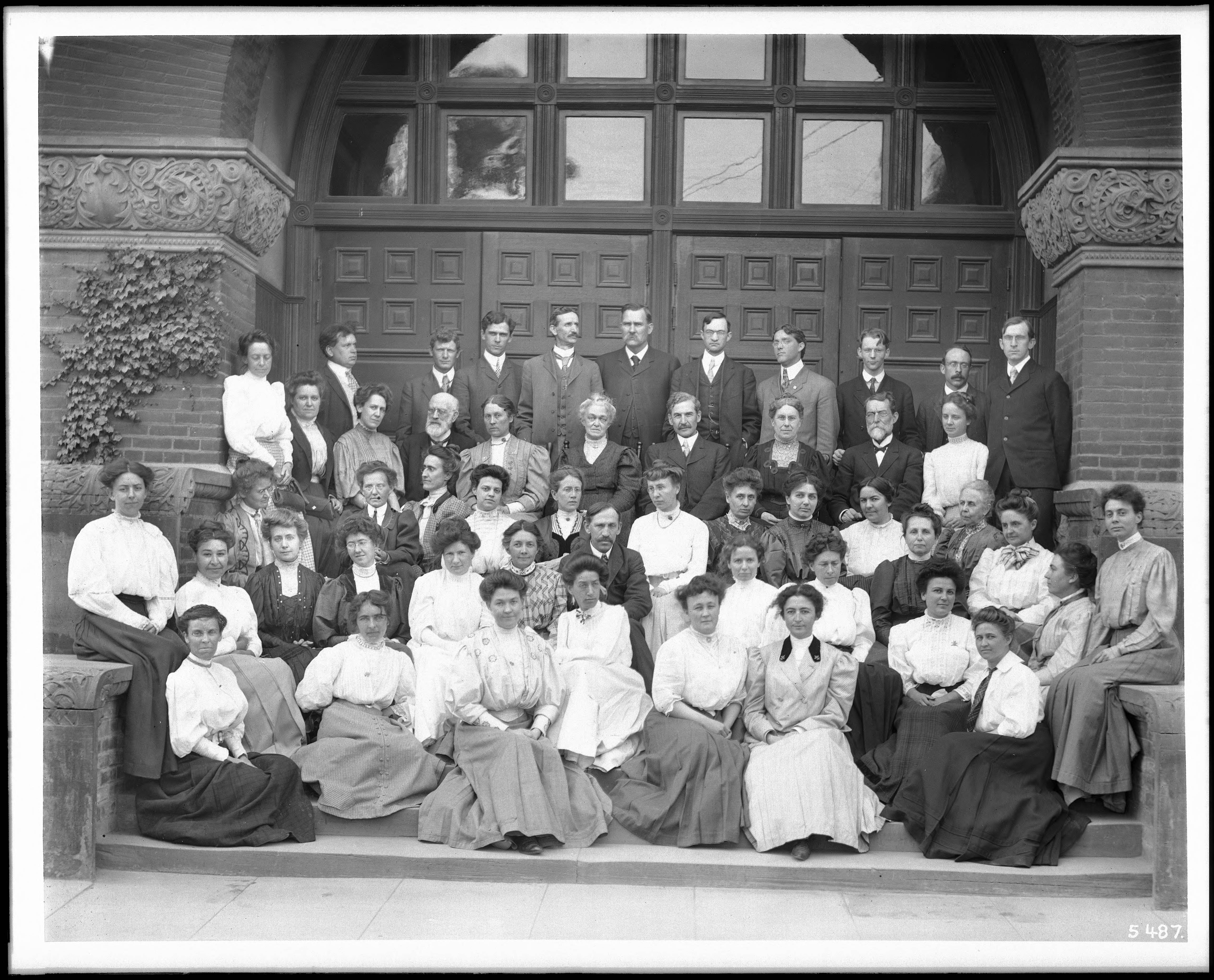
Los Angeles High School faculty on May 7, 1907

Significant additions to the high school campus on the hill included the science hall in 1907, and the expression hall/cafeteria in 1911, the gymnasiums, and the annex.

In 1917, after the high school moved to its new campus, the Custer Avenue Intermediate School moved into the old high school buildings on Fort Moore Hill. As part of the move, the intermediate school changed its name to Central Intermediate School (and later to Central Junior High School). The old buildings continued to serve the junior high until 1936, when most were torn down. In October 1937, a newly built Central Junior High School building was dedicated on the same property.

In 1946, the junior high was closed and its students moved to Lafayette Junior High. Some of the Central Junior High's campus was demolished in the late 1940s for construction of the Hollywood Freeway. The headquarters of the Board of Education then occupied what remained of the junior high buildings for many decades, before the site became home to the Ramón C. Cortines School of Visual and Performing Arts. Most of Fort Moore Hill itself was removed in 1949 for the construction of the freeway, which opened in December 1950. Also located on what remains of the hill is the Fort Moore Pioneer Memorial, which was opened to the public in 1957.

The nearby Fort Moore School eventually became a school for problem students, a lot of them truancy cases. By September 1948, when preparing for this school to be razed for the construction of the Hollywood Freeway, plans were made to transfer the students to Belmont High School, in the Echo Park area of Los Angeles. As Belmont students and parents protested the transfers, an alternative plan provided that 12 persons be assigned to the senior and junior high schools in the six attendance areas to carry out the program.

=== 1917, Olympic Boulevard ===
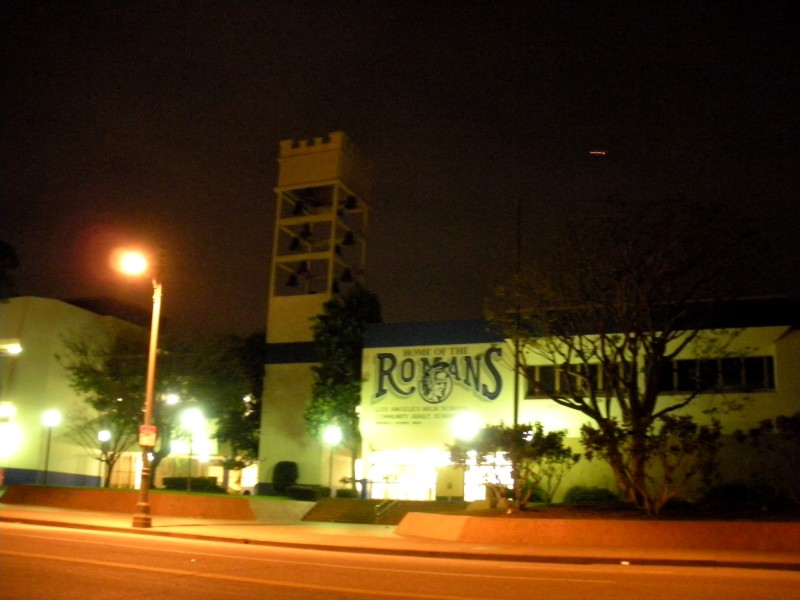
LAHS at night in 2009

In 1917, the school moved to its current location on Olympic Boulevard, and Rimpau with 1,937 students. The new campus was designed by John C. Austin and Frederic M. Ashley in an Elizabethan/Jacobean Revival style, often described as Collegiate Gothic, typical of academic architecture of the period. To ensure a permanently beautiful vista for contemplation and to honor classmates who had fallen in World War I, students and alumni purchased the land across the street to create a tree-filled memorial park. On that site, the Memorial Branch Library was later built, also designed by Austin and Ashley, in a Tudor Revival style intended to harmonize with the high school building across Olympic Boulevard.

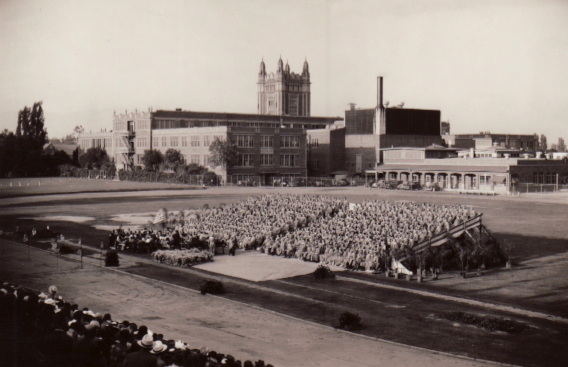
South view of 3rd location, with graduating class of 1940 in foreground.

Actual student government was instituted at LAHS in the early 1900s, eliminating one of the main reasons for Star and Crescent's existence. Meanwhile, as the size of the student body increased over years, the lower grades were successively dropped from Star and Crescent until by 1935 only seniors were members. Star and Crescent probably disappeared after World War II, but it is difficult to determine the exact year since no one at the school today can say when it ended. In particular, yearbooks were published during the years of America's involvement in that war, so it seems likely it might have disappeared after the war years. In the S'42 yearbook a page was devoted to Star and Crescent with its Officers and Faculty sponsors listed. The graduating class of 1970 received their Star & Crescent pins at a special ceremony.

On July 1, 1961, the Los Angeles City High School District and the elementary school districts were merged into the Los Angeles Unified School District. For many years, The Blue and White Daily was one of the few high school newspapers to be published Tuesday through Friday mornings during the school year except for holidays and the first 11 and last five days of the semester. It was a four-page paper. In 1962, "Daily" was dropped from the name and the publication became a weekly. It is currently published monthly.

Los Angeles High School is shown in the opening credits of the 1940s movie "Strike Up The Band" and the 1943 movie "Henry Aldrich Gets Glamour". The popular late 1960s and early 1970s television series Room 222 was filmed at LAHS.

=== 1971, Olympic Boulevard ===
The 1917 building sustained moderate cosmetic damage, principally in the tower area, during the Sylmar earthquake in 1971. Efforts spearheaded by the Alumni Association, founded in 1876, to repair and preserve the iconic structure were opposed by certain commercial interests, who lobbied for its demolition, and finally decisively thwarted when it was gutted by a fire of mysterious origin. The replacement structure has been universally decried and finds no champions among either current or former students and faculty, or residents of the neighboring community.

The school population peaked at 10,800, but overcrowding at the school has been relieved by West Adams Preparatory High School, which opened in the 2007–2008 school year. In 2009, some territory of Los Angeles High School's attendance boundary was transferred to Fairfax High School.

In February 2012, a gunman shot at teenage students near the high school. Two were wounded.

== Neighborhoods served by LAHS ==
Neighborhoods zoned to LAHS include: Brookside, Harvard Heights, Koreatown, Lafayette Square, and Little Ethiopia, and portions of Hancock Park and the Pico-Union District.

== Enrollment and demographics ==
Student demographics for the 2023–2024 school year
1. Hispanic/Latino (84.4%)
2. Black (8.50%)
3. Asian (2.50%)
4. Filipino (0.80%)
5. Pacific Islander (0.10%)
6. Other (3.70%)

As of the 2023–2024 school year, the school had an enrollment of 971 students, a decrease of 5.7% from the previous year of 1,028 students. Of this demographic, 8.5% students were black, 2.5% were Asian, 0.8% were Filipino, 84.4% were Hispanic/Latino, and 0.1% percent were Pacific Islander.

== Academics ==
In 2001, the school was reported to have the only full-time Korean language program in LAUSD, with more than 100 students enrolled, 80% of whom were not of Korean heritage.

=== Graduation requirements ===
As of 2023-2024, students must complete four years of English, three years each of social studies and mathematics, two years of laboratory science, two years of a Language Other Than English, two years of physical education, one year of a college preparatory elective, and one semester of health.

=== Advanced Placement ===
Students are accepted into the Advanced Placement Program and individual advanced placement classes based on faculty and counselor recommendations.

=== English Learners ===
About one-fifth of the student body is classified as English Learners, with additional students identified as Standard English Learners. Instruction follows the California English Language Development Standards.

== Notable alumni ==
- Margaret Q. Adams, first female deputy sheriff in United States
- Yda Hillis Addis, translator who mysteriously disappeared
- Lou Almada, baseball player
- Mel Almada, first Mexican-American in Major League Baseball
- Jimmy Allen, NFL player, 1972–1973 UCLA, 1974–1977 Pittsburgh Steelers, 1978–1981 Detroit Lions
- Kanati Allen, Olympic gymnast
- Tod Andrews, actor
- Jack Banta, NFL player
- Anne Baxter, Oscar-winning actress
- Scotty Beckett, actor
- Pauline Betz, tennis champion
- Dallas Bixler, Olympic gymnast
- Fletcher Bowron, four-term mayor of Los Angeles 1938–1953
- Ray Bradbury, science-fiction author
- Larry Brown, Dallas Cowboys, Oakland Raiders cornerback, Super Bowl XXX MVP
- Charles Bukowski, writer, poet
- John Cage, composer
- John P. Cassidy, Los Angeles City Council member, 1962–1967
- Richard Chew, film editor
- Frank Chuman, civil rights attorney and author
- Johnnie Cochran, attorney who defended O. J. Simpson
- Lynn "Buck" Compton, World War II veteran portrayed in Band of Brothers, Deputy DA of Los Angeles County who convicted Sirhan Sirhan
- Gary Conway, actor
- Lillian Copeland (1904–1964), Olympic discus champion; set world records in discus, javelin, and shot put
- Harry Danning, 4x MLB All Star baseball player
- Vernon Dean, NFL player
- Mel Durslag, sportswriter
- Aileen Eaton, boxing promoter
- Bruce Edwards, actor
- Mike Evans, actor
- Robert C. Farrell (born 1936), journalist and member of the Los Angeles City Council, 1974–1991
- Louise Fazenda, actress
- Lita Gaithers, Tony Award-nominee singer-songwriter
- Siedah Garrett, Grammy-winning singer-songwriter
- Marjorie Gestring, Olympian (swimming and diving)
- John M. Goddard, led first explorations by kayak down Nile and Congo Rivers
- Dave Gold, founder of 99 Cents Only Stores
- Carl Greenberg, newspaperman
- Clementina D. Griffin, educator, principal, aviator
- Horace Hahn, actor
- Juanita Hansen, silent film actress
- Aiko Herzig-Yoshinaga, activist, did not graduate due to internment in Manzanar in senior year (1942) but later received her diploma in 1989
- Dustin Hoffman, Oscar-winning actor
- Robert Horton, actor
- Christianne Meneses Jacobs, writer, editor and founder of Iguana Magazine (nation's only Spanish-language magazine for children)
- Cornelius Johnson, Olympic champion (1936, track and field)
- Willis Lamb, shared Nobel Prize for Physics in 1955 for discoveries related to superfine structure of hydrogen spectrum
- Milt Larsen, co-founder of Magic Castle
- Piper Laurie, 3-time Oscar-nominated actress
- Homer Lea, general in army of Sun Yat-sen, writer of books of geopolitics
- Gene LeBell, stuntman
- Linda Levi, artist
- Bessie Love, actress
- Mike Marienthal, athlete, 1990 UCLA Sports Hall of Fame
- Sam Match (1923–2010), tennis player
- Ray May, NFL player, 1967–1969 Pittsburgh Steelers, 1970–1973 Baltimore Colts (Super Bowl), 1973–1975 Denver Broncos
- Naida McCullough, pianist, teacher
- Bob Meusel, baseball player, New York Yankees teammate of Babe Ruth and Lou Gehrig
- Josephine Miles, poet
- Marvin Mitchelson, palimony attorney
- Carmel Myers, actress
- Jerry Nemer (1912–1980), basketball player and attorney
- Anita Ortega, basketball player, LAPD
- Budge Patty, tennis champion
- Don Paul, NFL player
- Leonard Pennario, concert pianist
- Cal Peterson, NFL player
- Emily Brown Portwig, Los Angeles clubwoman and pharmacist
- Donald Prell, futurologist
- Al Raffo, baseball player
- Madlyn Rhue, actress
- Charles Francis Richter, inventor of Richter Scale
- Frederick Madison Roberts, first African American elected to California State Legislature (1919–1933)
- Earl Scheib, auto-painting entrepreneur
- Budd Schulberg, Oscar-winning screenwriter
- Harry Shearer, actor, comedian, musician, radio host, writer, and producer known for Spinal Tap, The Simpsons
- Leonard Slatkin, Grammy-winning orchestral conductor, author, and composer
- Bowen Stassforth, Olympian (silver medalist in swimming)
- Art Stoefen, basketball player
- Lester Stoefen, tennis player
- Louise Suski, newspaper editor
- Miiko Taka, actress
- George Takei, actor, known for Star Trek
- Harry Thompson, NFL player
- William Irwin Thompson, poet and cultural historian
- Kathryn Doi Todd, first Asian American female judge
- Mel Tormé, singer, songwriter and actor
- Dick Walsh, baseball and soccer executive
- Doodles Weaver, actor and comedian
- Francis J. Weber, historian, author on California's mission period
- Matt Weinstock, newspaper columnist
- Tad Wieman, college football coach
- Rosalind Wiener Wyman, political figure
- Anna May Wong, actress
- Chloé Zhao, Oscar-winning film director

== See also ==
- Central Business District, Los Angeles (1880–1899)
