= Mike Marienthal =

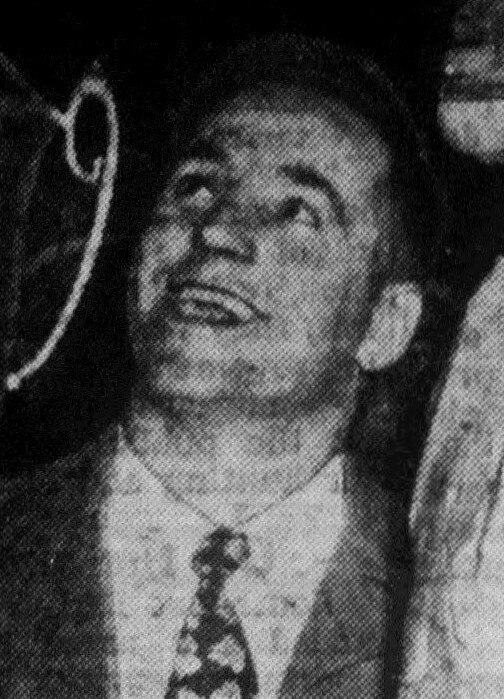
- Marienthal, circa 1951

Personal information
- Born: June 19, 1923; Chicago, Illinois, U.S.
- Died: February 27, 2013 (aged 89); Santa Ana, California, U.S.

Career information
- College: UCLA Bruins (1942–46)

Michael Marienthal (June 19, 1923 – February 27, 2013) was a UCLA sports icon, football player and men’s basketball official scorer for 50 years. Born in Chicago, his family moved to California, where he graduated from Los Angeles High School in the winter of 1942. Marienthal served the UCLA and Los Angeles communities throughout his life. As a UCLA football player, he was a member of the 1942 team that advanced to the Rose Bowl for the first time in the school’s history.

== Early life ==
After graduating from UCLA Naval ROTC, he joined the Marines and in May 1945 in the battle of Okinawa, Marienthal lost his left leg above the knee and severely injured his right leg in a mortar attack. He was awarded the U.S. Navy Letter of Commendation and the Purple Heart. He returned to UCLA in 1946 to complete his undergraduate degree. He also earned a Master's in 1951 and served on the UCLA football staff from 1946-48. On December 6, 1946, at the age of 23, he served as the official scorer at his first UCLA men's basketball game. He held the position with distinction for 50 years, retiring at the end of the 1995-96 season. He traveled to countless arenas around the country, served under eight head coaches and witnessed all 11 of UCLA's NCAA basketball championships. Marienthal served as a Personnel Scout and Evaluator for the Los Angeles Rams 1951-1973.

== Teaching career ==
Marienthal was a teacher, coach and secondary school administrator in the Los Angeles Unified School District for 35 years. He began his career at Jefferson High School (Los Angeles) in 1948, where he served as a teacher and head football coach until 1953. At Jefferson, he led his team to City Championships and lost only two games as head coach. For his final 18 years in LA Unified, he was a principal at Nimitz, Webster and Audubon junior high schools, retiring in 1983.

== Awards ==
Marienthal was inducted into the UCLA Athletics Hall of Fame in 1990 and in 1988, he was honored with a University Service Award by the UCLA Alumni Association.
