= Art Stoefen =

American basketball player

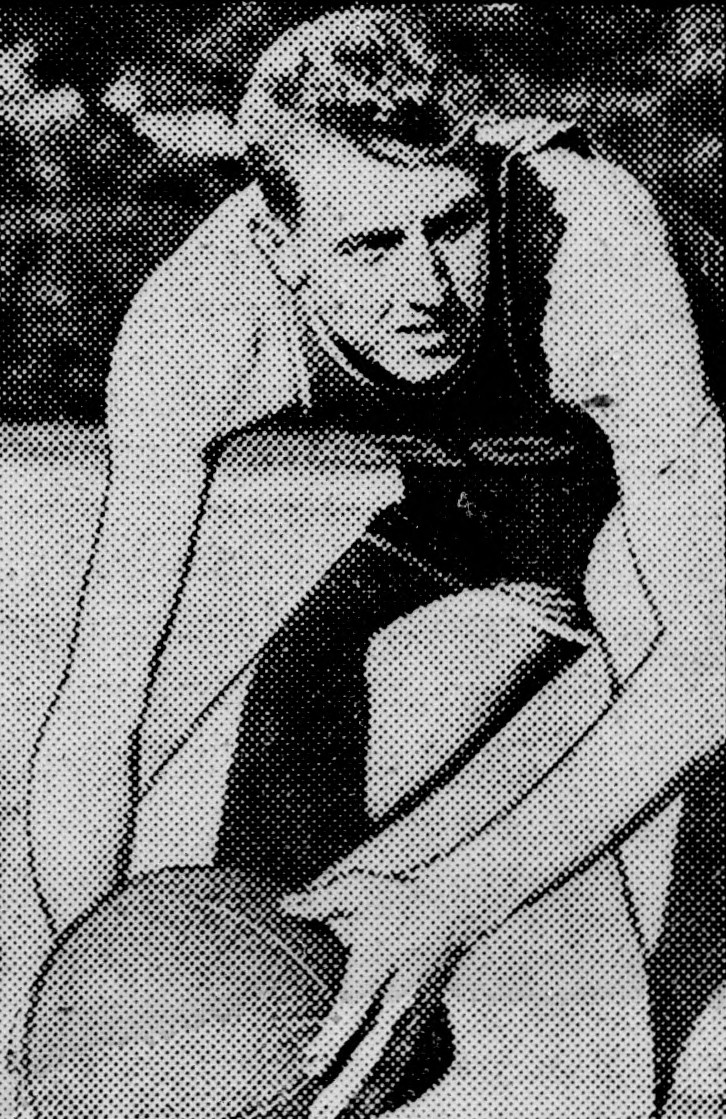
- Stoefen, circa 1938

Personal information
- Born: August 29, 1914 Davenport, Iowa, U.S.
- Died: January 7, 1995 (aged 80) Bend, Oregon, U.S.
- Listed height: 6 ft 5 in (1.96 m)
- Listed weight: 215 lb (98 kg)

Career information
- High school: Los Angeles (Los Angeles, California)
- College: Stanford (1935–1938)
- Position: Center / power forward

Career history
- 1946–1947: Chicago American Gears

Career highlights
- NBL champion (1947); Second-team All-American – MSG (1938); First-team All-PCC (1938)

Arthur Oscar Stoefen (August 29, 1914 – January 7, 1995) was an American basketball player. He was an All-American college player at Stanford University and played professionally in the American National Basketball League (NBL).

Stoefen, a 6'5" center-power forward, played college basketball alongside future Hall of Fame forward Hank Luisetti in the late thirties. The duo led the Cardinal to a 68–11 record over their three varsity seasons. As a senior in 1937–38, Stoefen was named first-team All-Pacific Coast Conference and a second-team All-American by Madison Square Garden. He is a member of the Stanford Athletics Hall of Fame.

Following his college career, Stoefen played for the integrated Los Angeles Red Devils team with future baseball hall of famer Jackie Robinson in 1946–47. During the season, he moved to the Chicago American Gears of the NBL.

Stoefen was the cousin of tennis star Lester Stoefen. Newspapers often reported that they were brothers, a fact he grew tired of correcting. Arthur was born in Iowa, but moved to California in his youth and he excelled athletically at Los Angeles High School.
