= Albert Stewart (sculptor) =

American sculptor (1900–1965)

- Born: April 9, 1900; Kensington, England
- Died: September 23, 1965 (aged 65)
- Education: Beaux-Arts Institute of Design and the Art Students League of New York
- Known for: sculpture
- Patrons: Edwin T. Bechtel, George Frederick Kunz

Albert Theodore Stewart (April 9, 1900 – September 23, 1965) was an American sculptor.

== Life ==
He was born in Kensington, England.

He arrived in America in 1908 and was orphaned shortly thereafter. Through the intervention of a wealthy benefactor, Edwin T. Bechtel, Stewart was allowed to pursue his art studies at the Beaux-Arts Institute of Design and the Art Students League of New York, staples for young and impoverished sculptors of the day. Upon completing his studies, Bechtel helped him obtain some needed commissions.

Dr. George Frederick Kunz, vice-president of Tiffany & Co., also assisted him, and after his death in 1932, in his will, he bequeathed to "Albert T. Stewart, a friend and sculptor," five shares of non-par capital stock in Tiffany & Co.

During World War I, he went to Canada and joined the Royal Air Force. When he returned after the war, he worked as an assistant to both Frederick MacMonnies and Paul Manship.

During the 1930s he worked for the Section of Painting and Sculpture. Throughout his career Stewart frequently was employed to create architectural sculptures. In 1939, he was appointed head of the sculpture program at Scripps College in Claremont, California at the invitation of Millard Sheets. He moved to California and stayed there the rest of his life.

== Selected architectural sculpture ==
- Buffalo City Hall friezes, Buffalo, New York 1931
- Decorative panels, 333 Michigan Avenue Building, Chicago, Illinois 1931
- Waldo Hutchins bench (1932), Central Park, New York City, Eric Gugler, architect. Stewart designed the small sundial, a variation on a 3rd century BC Hellenistic period Berossus sundial, and the bas relief decoration (carved in marble by the Piccirilli Brothers), and sculptor Paul Manship designed the bronze sundial figure.
- Frieze and Eagle, post office, Albany, New York 1933
- Municipal Auditorium reliefs, Kansas City, Missouri 1934

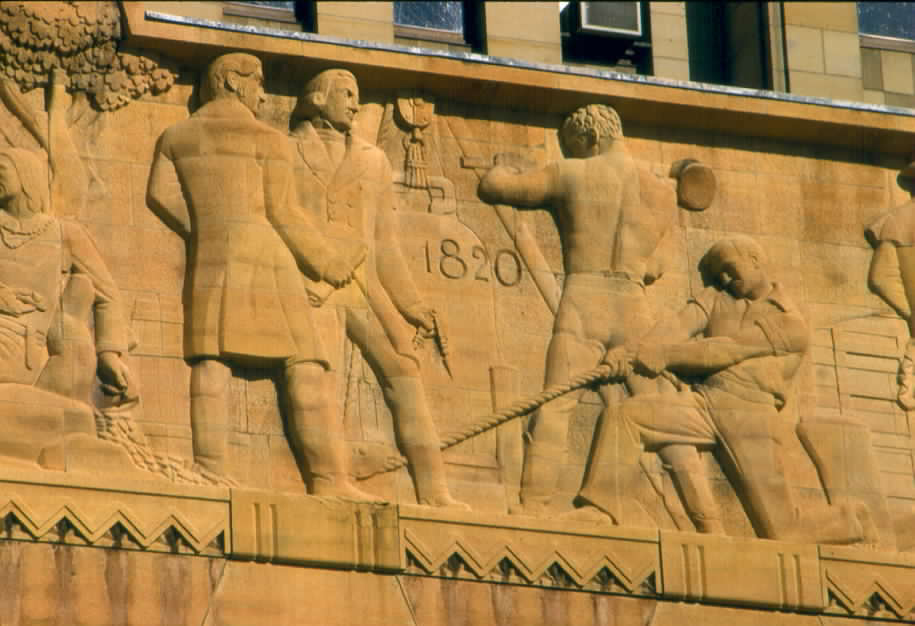
Buffalo NY City Hall

- Pediment, Department of Labor Building, Washington D.C. 1934
- United States Customs Building, Washington, D.C. 1935
- Panels & Eagle, United States Mint Building, San Francisco, California 1935
- Panels, the Nassau County Courthouse, Mineola, New York 1939
- Panels on Home Builder's Savings and Loan Association, Pomona, California 1946
- Animal figures in brick wall at Los Angeles County Fair Grounds at Pomona 1952
- Reliefs, Life Science Building, UCLA, Los Angeles, California 1953
- Figures, Los Angeles County Courthouse, Los Angeles, California 1956
- Reliefs, Mormon Battalion History, Fort Moore Pioneer Memorial, Los Angeles, California 1957
- Horse figure, Swaps - Hall of Fame racing thoroughbred, Hollywood Park, Inglewood, California 1958
- Reliefs, Scottish Rite Temple, Los Angeles, California 1960

== Other works ==
- Baptistry doors, St. Bartholomew's Church, New York City 1931
- Elevator doors, Ramsey County Court House, St. Paul, Minnesota 1931
- Eagles for legs of Steinway & Sons piano given to the White House 1938
- Several works at United Church of Christ in Claremont, California, USA
- Several works across the campus of Scripps College, Claremont, California:
  - Eternal Primitive, in the Margaret Fowler Garden, from 1965
  - Man and Nature, bronze, in the Humanities Building, from 1965
  - Fawn statue and vase, bronze, in the Chinese Garden by Mallott Dining Commons, from 1952
- Several works at Brookgreen Gardens in Myrtle Beach, South Carolina
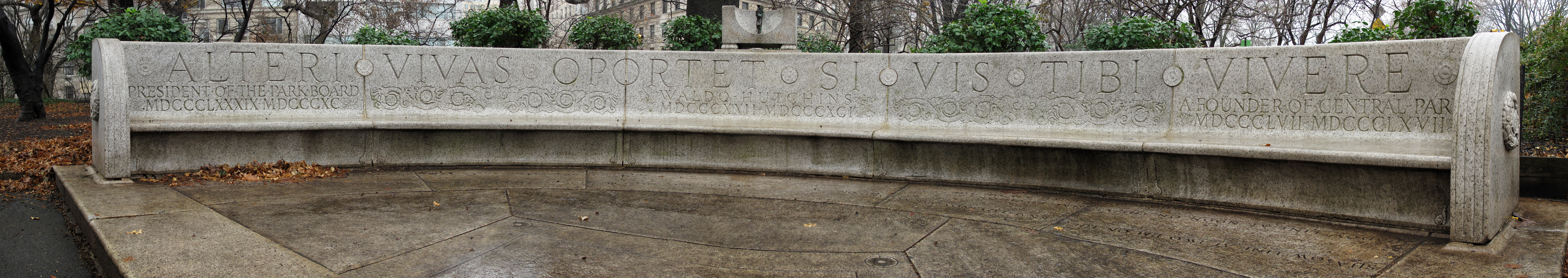
Waldo Hutchins bench (1932), Central Park, New York City.

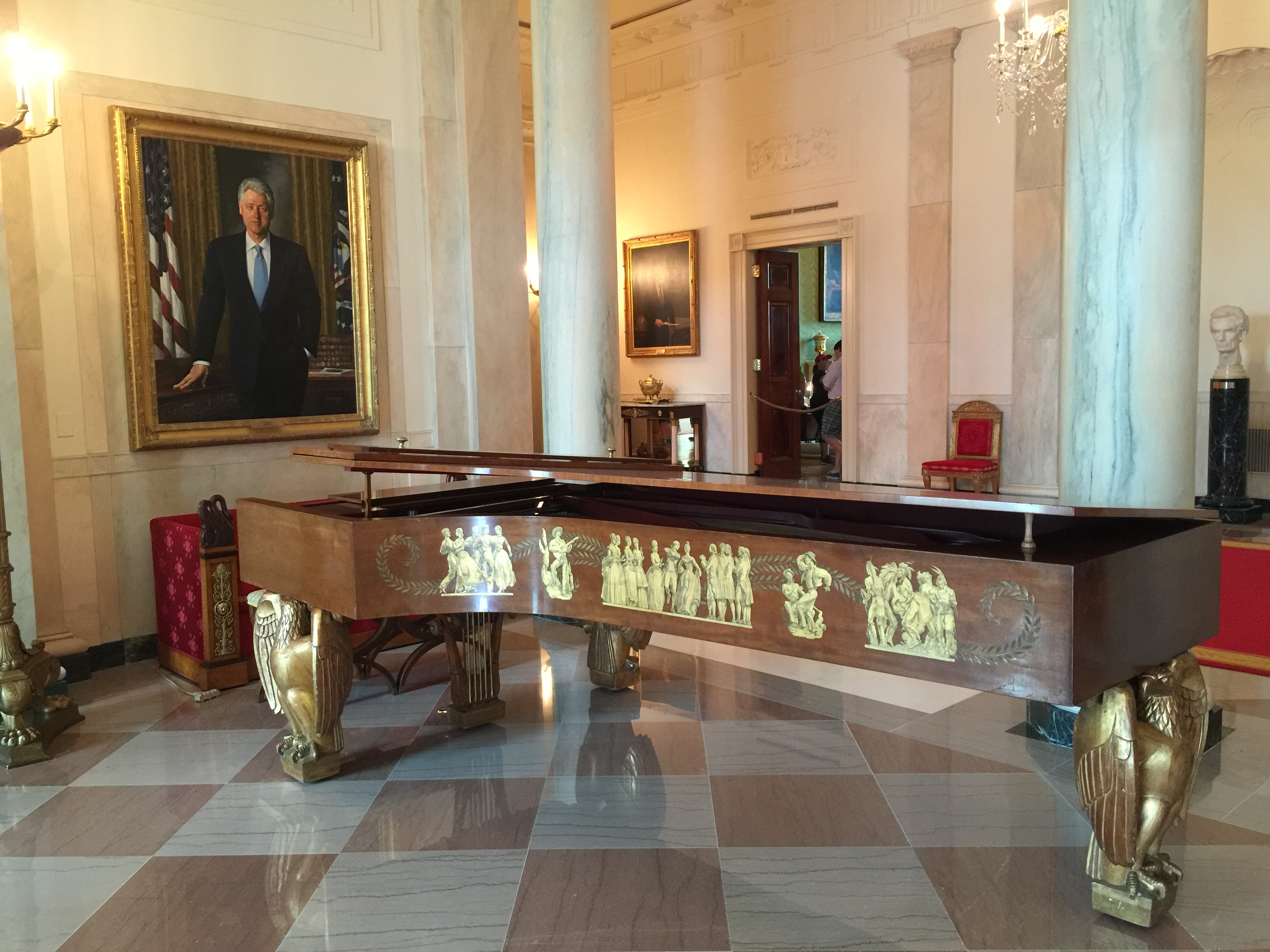
White House Steinway Piano (1938), case designed by Eric Gugler, painted frieze by Dunbar Beck.

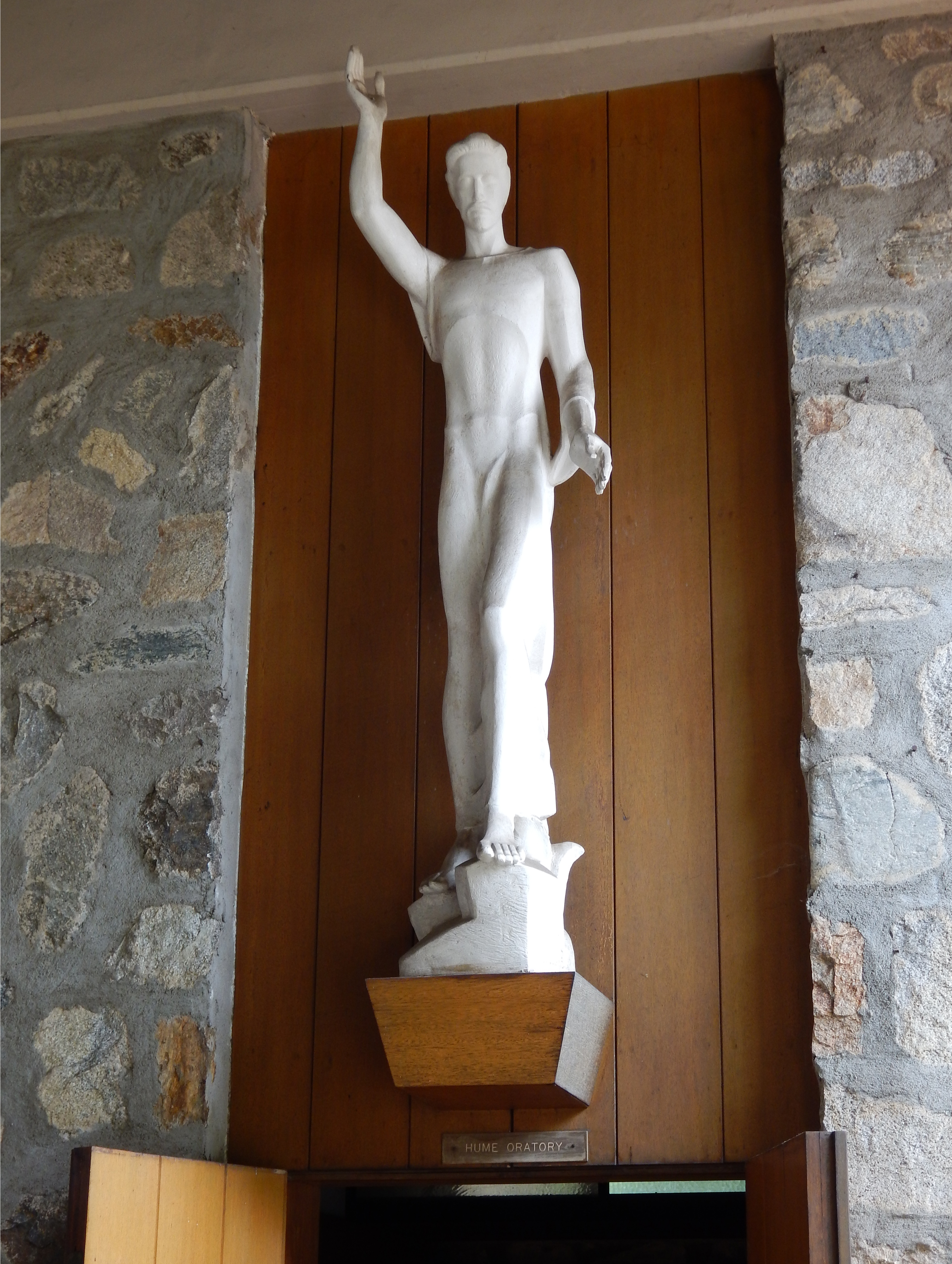
Christ the Teacher (1943), United Church of Christ, Claremont, California

== Bibliography ==
- Falk, Peter Hastings, Editor, Who Was Who in American Art, Sound View Press, Madison Connecticut, 1985 ISBN 0-932087-00-0
- Goode, James M. The Outdoor Sculpture of Washington D.C., Smithsonian Institution Press, Washington D.C. 1974 ISBN 0-87474-149-1
- Gurney, George, Sculpture and the Federal Triangle, Smithsonian Institution Press, Washington D.C. 1985 ISBN 0-87474-492-X
- Kvaran and Lockley, Guide to American Architectural Sculpture, unpublished manuscript
- McClellan, Douglas, at al, Albert Stewart, Scripps College, Claremont, California 1966
- Opitz, Glenn B, Editor, Mantle Fielding's Dictionary of American Painters, Sculptors & Engravers, Apollo Book, Poughkeepsie NY, 1986, 2nd edition, ISBN 0-938290-04-5
- Pare, Richard, Editor, Court House, a Photographic Document, Horizon Press, New York NY 1978, 0-8180-0030-9
- Proske, Beatrice Gilman, Brookgreen Gardens Sculpture, Brookgreen Gardens, South Carolina, 1968. No ISBN available.
