= Fort Moore (California) =

Former Mexican-American War era fort in Los Angeles, California, United States

- Los Angeles County, California
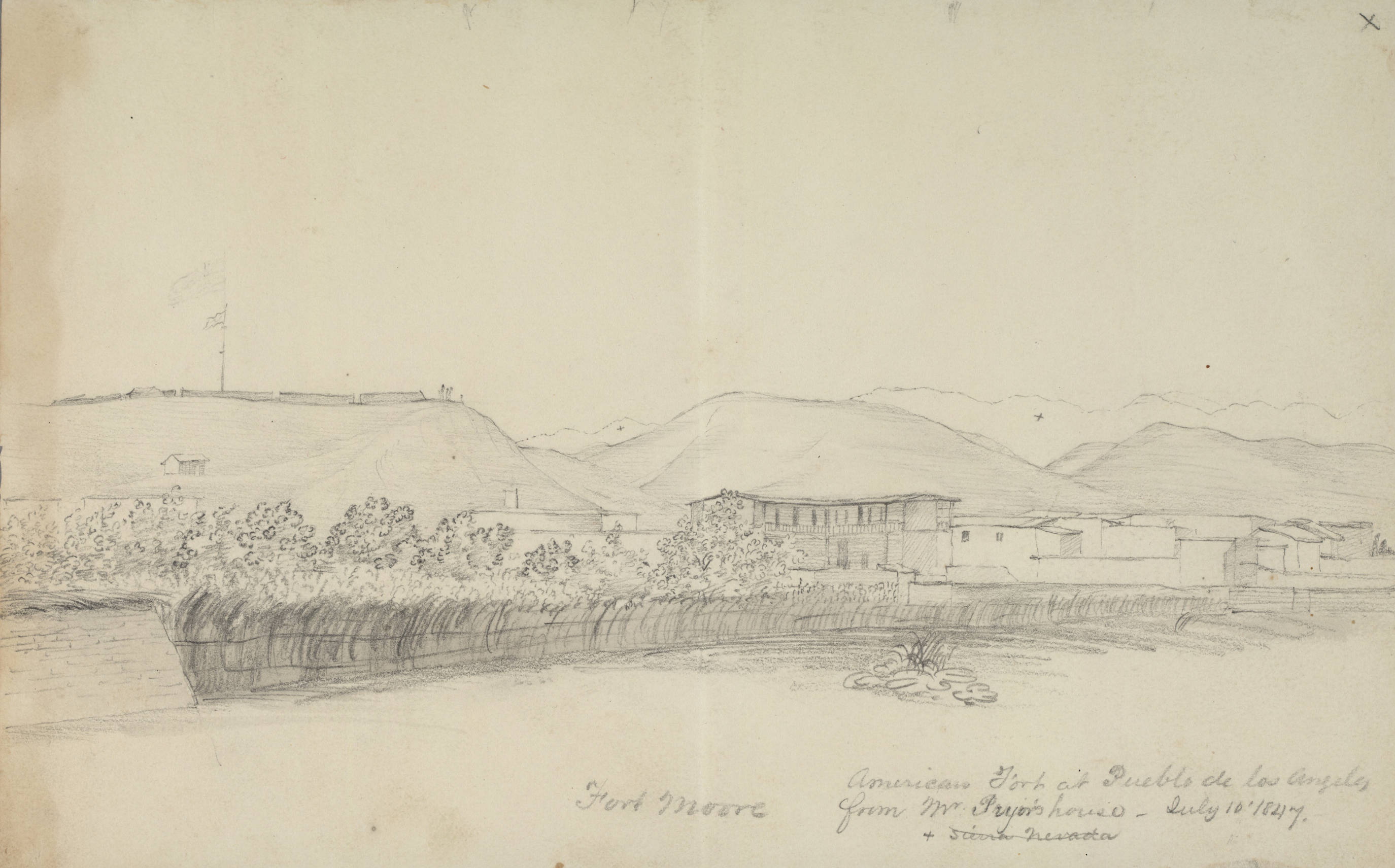
- Fort Moore is visible atop the hill overlooking the Pueblo de Los Ángeles in this drawing by William Hutton dated July 1847

Site information
- Condition: demolished

Location
- Location within the Los Angeles Metropolitan Area
- Location within the Los Angeles metropolitan area
- Coordinates: 34°03′29″N 118°14′30″W

Site history
- Built: 1847
- In use: 1847–1853

Fort Moore was a U.S. Military fortification built on Fort Hill (now called Fort Moore Hill) overlooking Los Angeles, California. The fort was constructed soon after the conquest of California in 1847, towards the end of the Mexican–American War.

Pueblo de Los Ángeles was first occupied by U.S. troops in August 1846, however the troops were forced out during the Siege of Los Angeles. In the course of the siege, American troops had climbed to the top of the hill where they erected a temporary barricade before being ejected from the city. When American troops again took Los Angeles in January 1847, they began construction of a fort at the site of the hill-top barricade. Known as the Post at Los Angeles, work on the fort was not completed before military leadership decided to replace the unfinished fort with the larger Fort Moore.

Thus, Fort Moore became the second fort and third fortification to be built on Fort Moore Hill. The fort was decommissioned within just a few years and the hill was divided up for different uses. Over the decades, the city’s first non-Catholic cemetery was established on the hill, many of Los Angeles’ elite built their mansions near its crest, and the local school district constructed various school buildings atop the hill.

In 1949, much of the hill was removed during construction of the Hollywood Freeway. In 1958, the Fort Moore Pioneer Memorial was completed to memorialize the fort and pioneers. Today, the Ramón C. Cortines School of Visual and Performing Arts is a significant institution on what remains of the hill.

== Mexican–American War ==
=== First occupation and siege ===
On August 13, 1846, U.S. naval forces under Commodore Robert F. Stockton arrived at Los Angeles without opposition. A small occupying force of 50 Marines, under Captain Archibald H. Gillespie, were put in charge when Commodore Stockton left the city a few weeks later. The harsh martial law of Captain Gillespie soon ignited a popular uprising among Californios and Mexicans led by General José María Flores beginning in September 1846. Known as the Siege of Los Angeles, Californios assembled a force to retake Los Angeles. Gillespie's fifty marines were able to resist an initial attack on the government house in town and regrouped on Fort Hill, where they constructed a barricade with sandbags and mounted their cannon. Gillespie sent Juan Flaco to Commodore Stockton asking for reinforcements, but they came too late. As time passed, the Californio forces opposing the U.S. takeover grew to over 600 men, with several Californio citizens voicing opposition. General Flores offered American troops an ultimatum: leave within 24 hours or face attack. Gillespie agreed to withdraw from Los Angeles, under safe passage, on September 30, 1846 on the American merchant ship Vandalia.

=== Second occupation and ceasefire ===
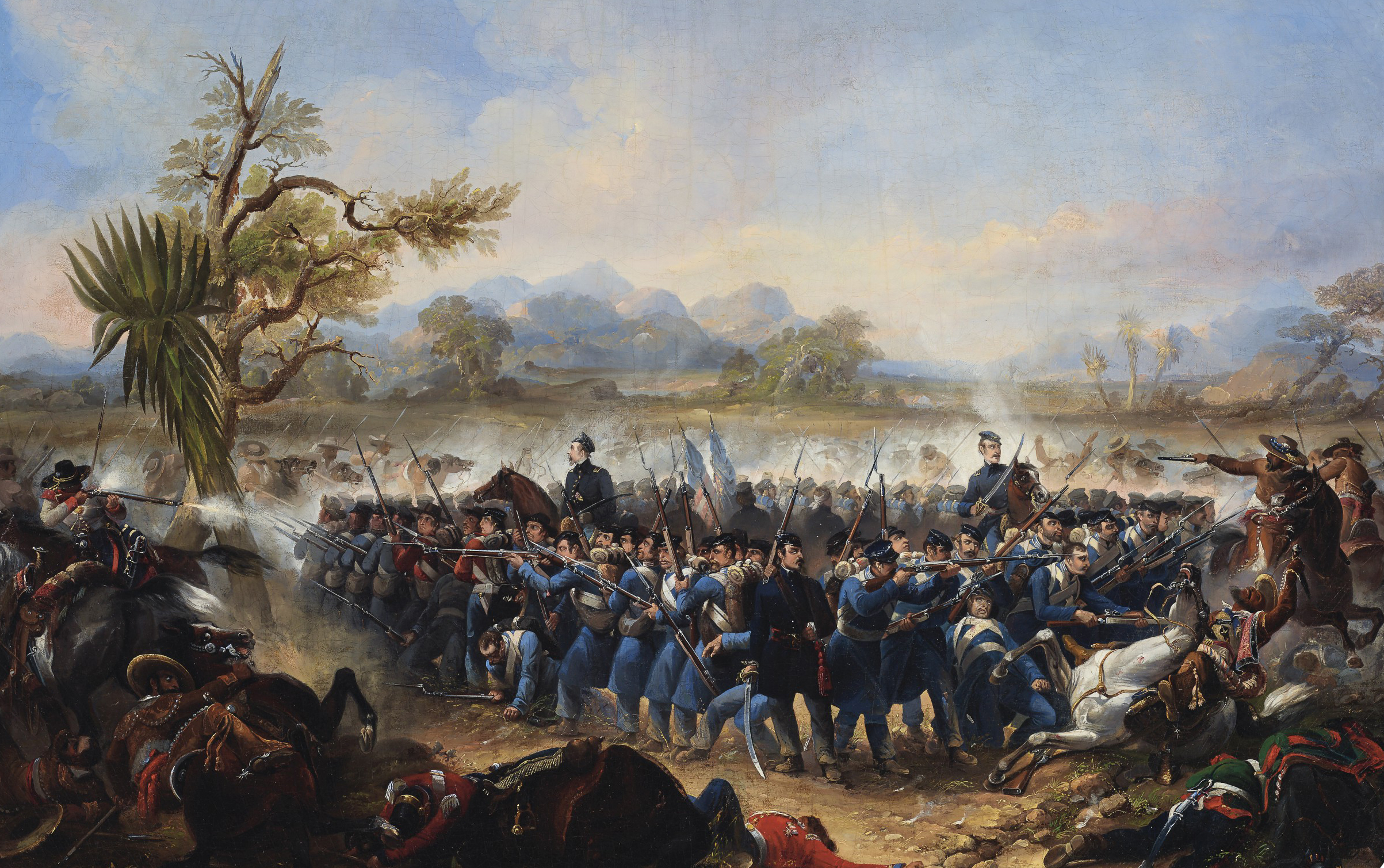
Battle of Rio San Gabriel

On October 7, the U.S. forces regrouped, with Commodore Stockton sending 350 Americans, including 200 U.S. Marines, under U.S. Navy Capt. William Mervine, to retake Los Angeles. The marines were defeated in their attempt at the Battle of Dominguez Rancho, as Stockton's fleet fled south to San Diego. In December, U.S. Army forces under Captain Stephen W. Kearny were defeated by the Californio Lancers at the Battle of San Pasqual. After regrouping and resupplying forces in San Diego, on January 10, 1847, Los Angeles was recaptured by the combined 700-man force of John C. Fremont, Stockton and Kearny, after the Battle of Rio San Gabriel and the Battle of La Mesa. With the signing of the Treaty of Cahuenga on January 13, 1847, war in Alta California ended.

=== Construction of the forts ===
==== Post at Los Angeles ====
On January 12, 1847, to secure the area from future attack, U.S. forces began erecting a star-shaped fort on the same strategic site as Gillespie's temporary barricade and named it the Post at Los Angeles. Designed by William H. Emory, the fortification was never completed as envisioned.

==== Fort Moore ====
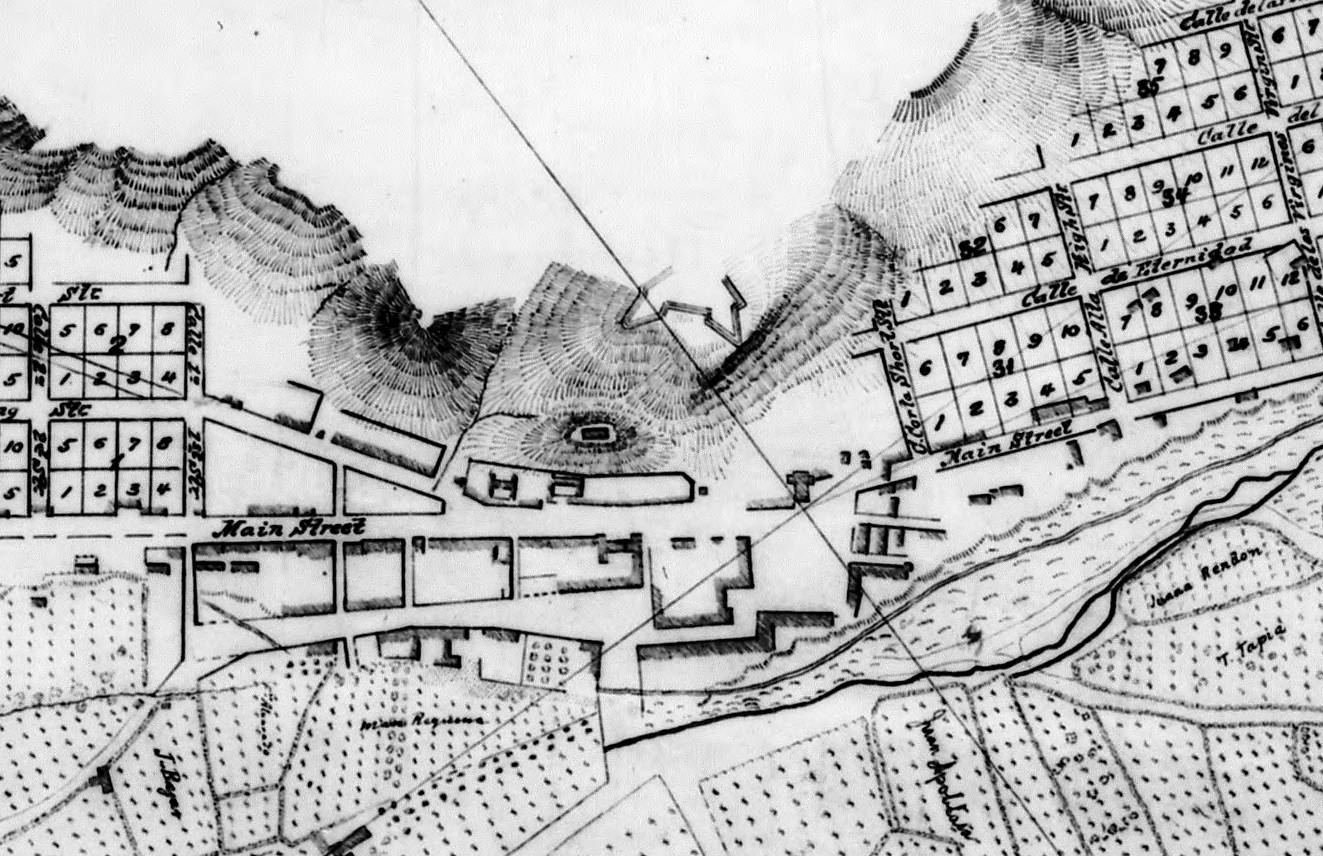
The walls of Fort Moore can be seen (near the top center of the drawing) on this August 1849 survey of Los Angeles by E. O. C. Ord

The plans for a fort on the hill were revised, and on April 23, 1847, construction of a larger defensive structure was begun on the same site. Designed by Lieutenant John W. Davidson of the U.S. 1st Dragoons, it was largely constructed by the Mormon Battalion. The fort was composed of a breastwork 400 feet (120 m) in length, with bastions and embrasures for six cannon. At the rear of the fort was a ravine, running from the top of the hill to a street in the village below. Timber for the structure was hauled from the San Gabriel Mountains by the Mormon Battalion, two pieces of which were spliced together to provide the fort with a 150 feet (46 m) high flagpole.

A ceremony to dedicate Fort Moore was held on July 4, 1847, as part of Independence Day celebrations. The fort was named after Captain Benjamin D. Moore, formerly of the 1st Dragoons, who had been killed in the Battle of San Pasqual in San Diego County, on December 6, 1846.

== Post-War development of Fort Moore Hill ==
Lieutenant William T. Sherman ordered the garrison withdrawn in 1848, and the fort was abandoned in 1849 and decommissioned in 1853. In later years the site was leveled and became a public playground.

In August 1882, Jacob Philippi (c. 1835–1892) purchased a tract of land on Fort Moore Hill and built a beer garden. He had started the New York Brewery, the first brewery in Los Angeles, and had owned a saloon in the Temple Block in the center of town. On the summit of the hill he had a rambling structure erected, covering much of the ground with wide galleries, and for many years following, as the story went, local inhabitants of Los Angeles would climb the hill sober and roll down drunk. It was an approximate equivalent of a later road house, an airy place with a view, refreshments and food, with half of its customers a polite crowd and half of them a tough lot.

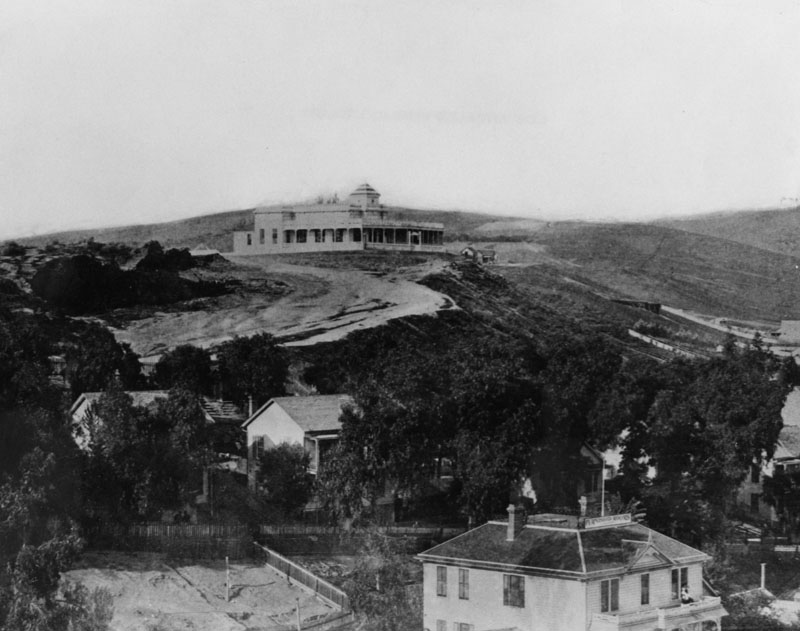
Banning Mansion near the summit of Fort Moore Hill in the 1880s

After Philippi closed down his beer garden resort, he sold the place in 1887 to Mary (Hollister) Banning (1846–1919), widow of the "Father of the Port of Los Angeles" Phineas Banning. She converted it into a residence, what locals came to call the "Banning Mansion." She lived there several years with her daughters, Mary Banning (1871–1956) and Lucy Banning (1876–1929). The enormous old structure made a charming home, which was cut up into suitable parlors and bedrooms and elegantly furnished, with a fine view. It was the scene of many social events attended by the first families of the city who drove up to it in their carriages. With the growth of the city, however, society moved to newer districts and left the old place to end its days as a rooming house.

=== Cemetery ===
Part of Fort Moore Hill became home to a cemetery, with the first documented burial tracing back to December 19, 1853 (being Andrew Sublette). Alternately known as Los Angeles City Cemetery, Protestant Cemetery, Fort Moore Hill Cemetery, Fort Hill Cemetery, or simply "the cemetery on the hill", it was the city's first non-Catholic cemetery. Victims of the Los Angeles Chinese massacre of 1871 were buried in this cemetery.

The cemetery was overseen by the city starting in 1869. It was not well taken care of, lacking clearly delineated boundaries, complete records or adequate maintenance. The Los Angeles City Council passed a resolution on August 30, 1879, closing the cemetery to any future burials except for those with already reserved plots. By 1884, the city had sold portions of the cemetery as residential lots and the rest to the Los Angeles Board of Education (later the Los Angeles Unified School District (LAUSD)).

The city initially never removed any bodies, and the former cemetery was the site of repeated, grisly findings and much negative press. As a result, the city began moving the bodies, most to Evergreen Cemetery, Rosedale Cemetery and Hollywood Memorial Park Cemetery, with the final bodies being transferred in May 1947.

In 2006, during construction of a new high school campus on the hill, the remains of 80 additional persons were discovered; archeologists were brought in to excavate and attempt to identify the deceased.

=== Underground features ===
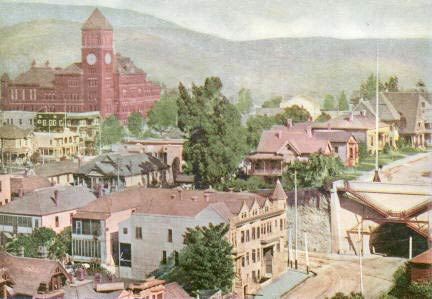
Los Angeles High School and homes atop Fort Moore Hill, circa 1910s, the Broadway Tunnel entrance can be seen at the lower right

To prevent the city's residents from needing to travel over or around the hills of early Los Angeles, transportation engineers created a series of tunnels in this part of the city. Running beneath Fort Moore Hill, the Broadway Tunnel was opened in 1901. A few years later, the Hill Street Tunnel opened for streetcars. The Broadway Tunnel was closed when much of the hill was cut away for the Hollywood Freeway and subsequent realignment of nearby streets, and the Hill Street Tunnel closed shortly after. The Hill Street Tunnel was located under the property belonging to the school district and once closed, the district used the sealed off tunnel for storage and archival space.

Los Angeles Metro's Red Line was routed under the hill when it opened in 1993.

In what has become part of the urban legends of Los Angeles, claims have been made about buried Spanish golden within the hill and stories have been told of lizard people creating tunnels beneath the surface. In 1933, two men approached the county government claiming to have a map showing the location of a vault within the hill that contained buried gold. They convinced officials to authorize a dig on the hill and soon after had driven a 28-foot (8.5 m) shaft, however no gold was found. One of the men returned to the following year and received another permit to dig, convincing others that ancient lizard people had constructed tunnels beneath the hill. This time, a 250-foot (76 m) hole was dug, before local newspapers lost interest in the story.

=== Schools ===
Los Angeles High School was originally located in a school building on nearby Poundcake Hill. In 1886, to make way for a new courthouse, the building was physically moved (atop stilts) to Fort Moore Hill. After the move, the building was refitted and classes started again in January 1887. This building was also called the Central School, housing both lower grades and the high school until a new high school building was constructed in 1890. The historic Central School structure remained on the hill (although its name changed from Central School to Sand Street School and then to California Street School) until it was torn down in 1949 to make way for the Hollywood Freeway.

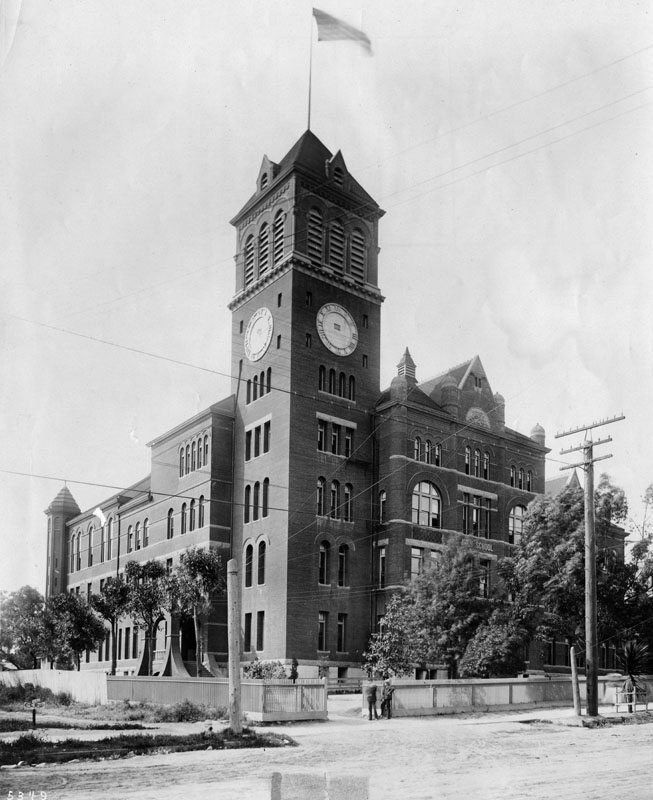
1890 Los Angeles High School building on Fort Moore Hill, taken circa 1908

The new high school building was constructed in 1890 on Fort Moore Hill, just to the east of Central School, along Hill Street. The location chosen for the new high school campus was controversial, given it being atop the old city cemetery. As the excavation for the foundation proceeded, children in the nearby Sand Street School fell ill, given the foul smell emanating from the cemetery during construction.

After completion, the new high school building was dedicated on December 30, 1890. While the high school was located on Fort Moore Hill, additions to its campus included the annex in 1900, science hall in 1907, the expression hall/cafeteria in 1911, and the gymnasiums.

In 1917, the high school moved to a new campus away from the hill, and the Central Junior High School moved into the 1890 high school building. (Note: The junior high was originally Custer Avenue Intermediate School, but as part of the move, the intermediate school's name was changed to Central Intermediate School (and later to Central Junior High School).) The campus continued to serve the junior high until 1936, when the older buildings were torn down. In October 1937, a newly built Central Junior High School building was dedicated on the same property.

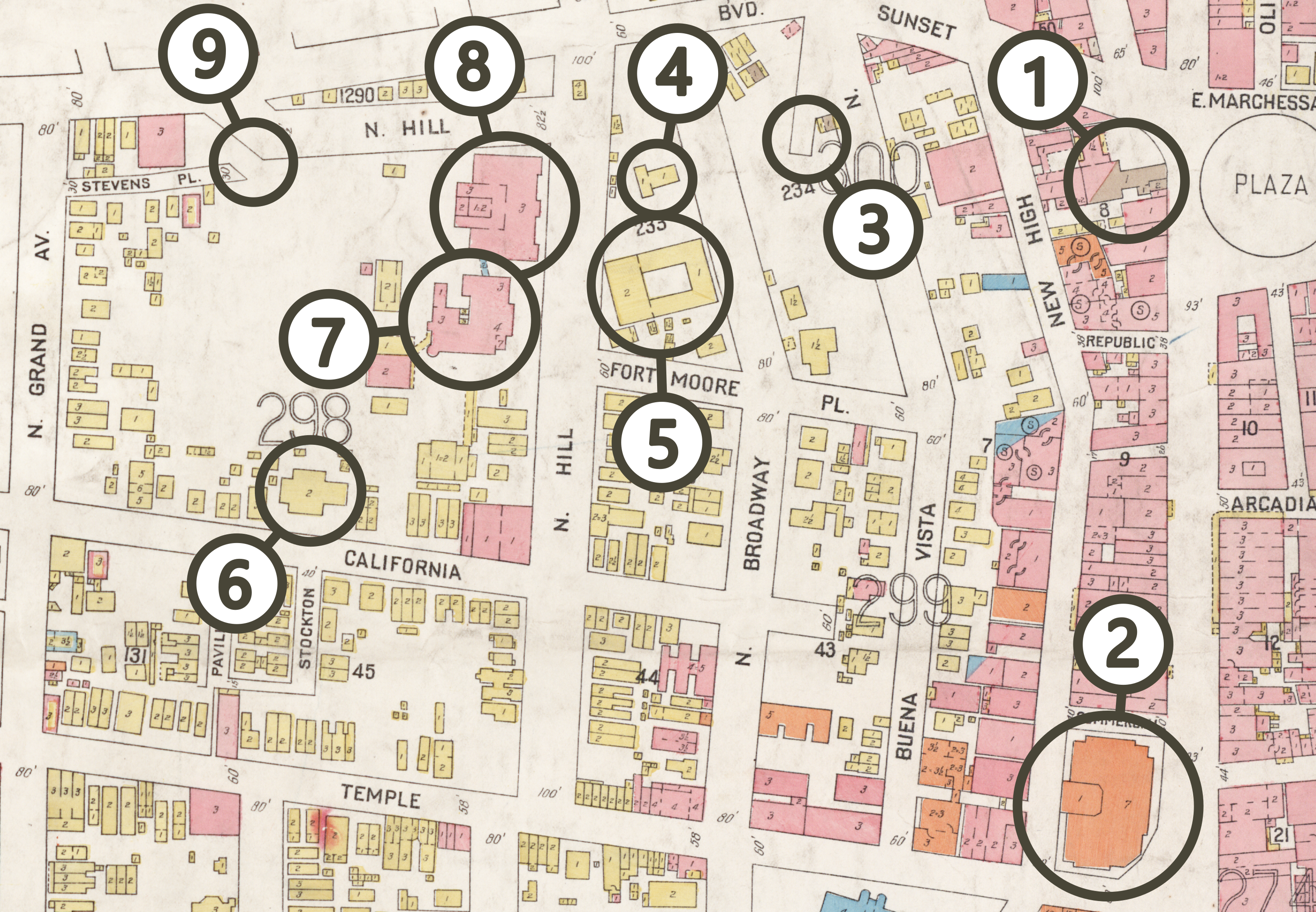
Fort Moore Hill and environs, 1920 Key: 1 - La Iglesia de Nuestra Señora la Reina de los Ángeles 2 - US Post Office and Courthouse 3 - Broadway Tunnel portal 4 - Mary Banning home (former beer garden structure) 5 - Former LA High School Annex 6 - California Street School (former Central School) 7 - Central Junior High (former LA High School) 8 - Central Junior High (former LA High School Science Hall) 9 - Hill Street Tunnel portal

In 1946, the junior high school was closed and its students moved to Lafayette Junior High. Some of the Central Junior High's campus was demolished in the late 1940s for construction of the Hollywood Freeway. What remained of the junior high campus on Fort Moore Hill was then used as headquarters for the Los Angeles Unified School District (LAUSD).

In the 20th century, the Fort Hill/Fort Moore Hill School for Corrective Children was also established within the complex of buildings on the hill used by the school district. This school closed in 1948 when some of the buildings were demolished for the Hollywood Freeway.

In 2001, the school district purchased the 29-story Beaudry building in downtown Los Angeles, moving their administrative offices into the tower after nearly 60 years in the buildings on Fort Moore Hill. The move freed up land for the school district to construct a new high school, which was needed given overcrowding in their school buildings. An additional high school was especially important due to the difficulties the school district was experiencing finishing the nearby Belmont Learning Center.

In March 2006, the school district approved the contract for construction of the new high school, with work on the structure beginning soon after. The completed building was opened on September 9, 2009, with the name Central Los Angeles High School #9. In 2011, the school's named was changed to the Ramón C. Cortines School of Visual and Performing Arts.

=== Removal of the hill ===
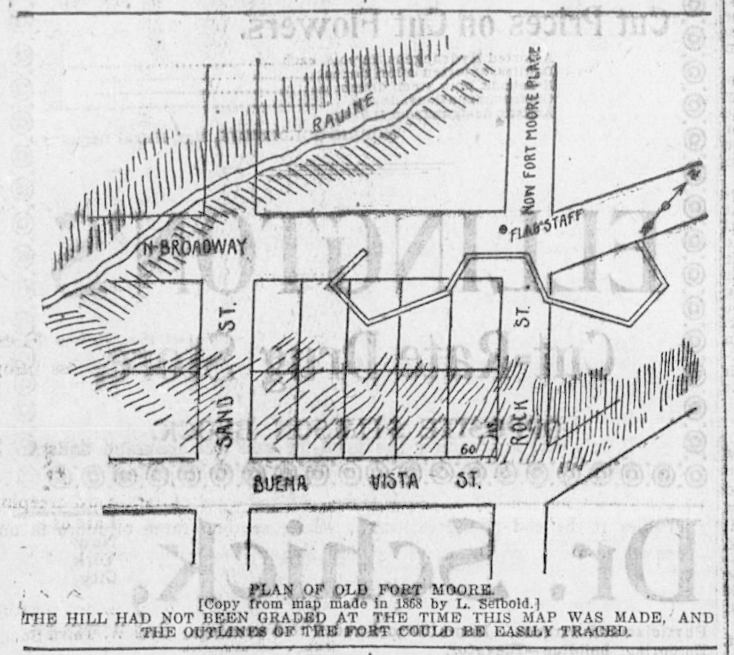
1868 survey of the fort's remains, laid over the city roads and plots as they existed in 1897

Like many of the hills in downtown Los Angeles which have been removed or greatly reduced in size to aid traffic, Fort Moore Hill is only a fraction of its original size. While areas of the hill had been removed over the years, the most significant portions were hauled away in the 1930s and 1940s. Starting in April 1934, the portion of hill closest to Los Angeles Plaza was removed to provide fill for the construction of Los Angeles Union Station and create a building lot for a new county office building; however, construction of the office building was eventually rejected at this location.

In 1949, the removal of large portions of Fort Moore Hill occurred as part of the construction of Hollywood Freeway and the subsequent realignment of Hill and Broadway Streets. The removal included both the remaining portion closest to the Los Angeles Plaza—which had been the site of the fort and early mansion homes of Los Angeles–which then became parking lots and a realigned Broadway and Hill Streets, along with a portion running parallel to the school property, which became the route of the freeway. The completed Hollywood Freeway opened in December 1950.

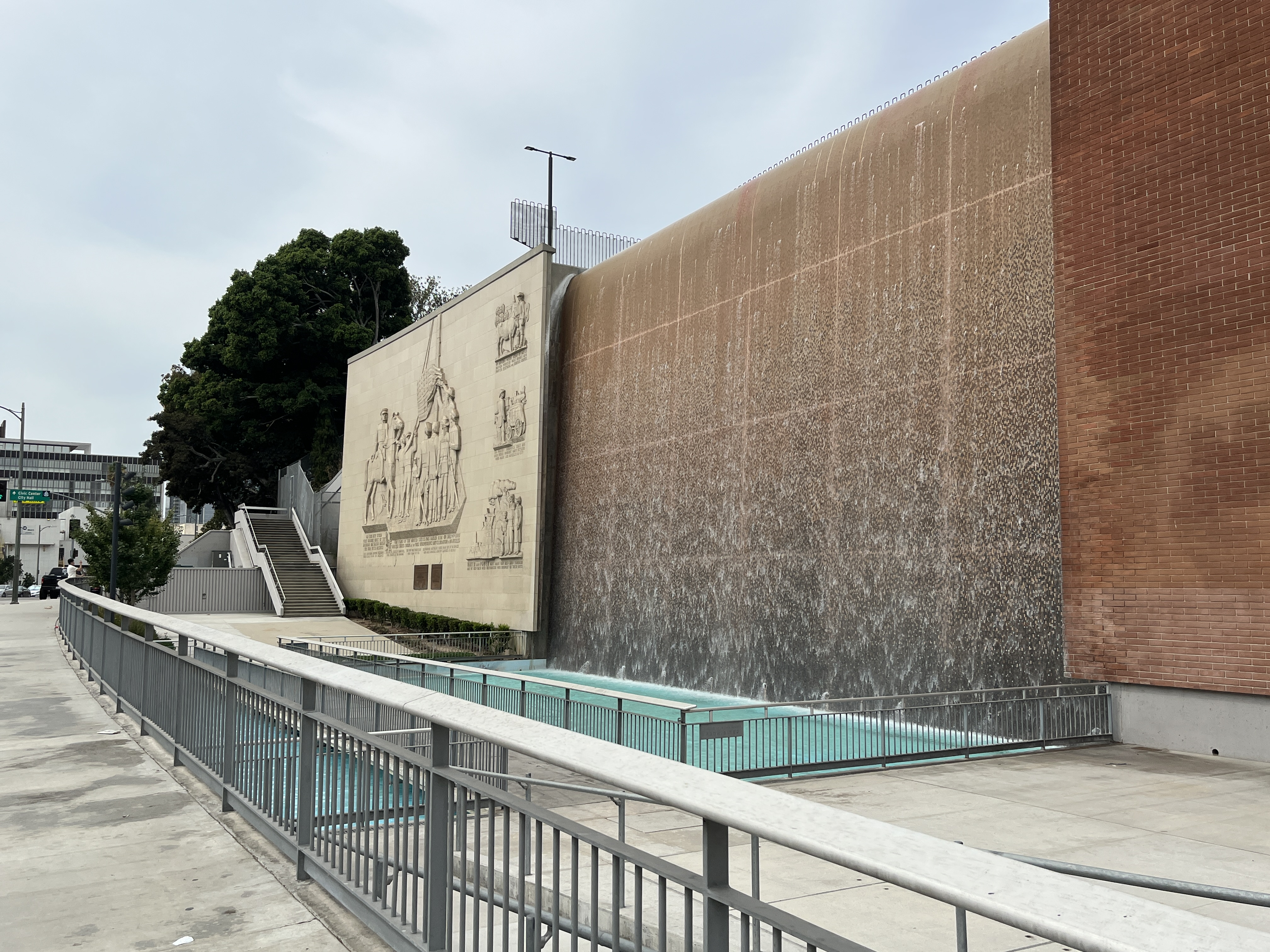
The 1958 Fort Moore Pioneer Memorial

On July 3, 1958, the Fort Moore Pioneer Memorial, located near the site of Fort Moore, was dedicated. It memorializes the troops who raised the American flag over the fort on July 4, 1847, during the first American Independence Day celebrations in Los Angeles, along with the pioneers who turned Los Angeles into a city.

For many decades, much of the cleared area between the Pioneer Memorial and Los Angeles Plaza was home to two large parking lots. In 2016, the LA Plaza de Cultura y Artes Foundation broke ground on a mixed-use development known as La Plaza Village, which replaced the two parking lots (with the county leasing the land to the foundation). Completed in 2019, the proceeds from the development helps support the foundation's museum.

== See also ==
- History of Los Angeles
- J. Win Austin, Los Angeles City Council member, 1941–43, opposed appropriation for pioneer monument.
