= Harry Thompson (American football) =

American football player (1926–2003)

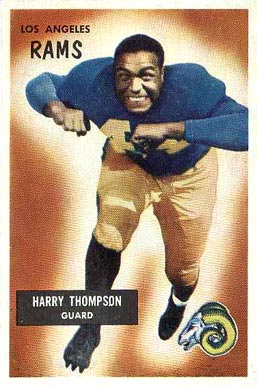
- Thompson on a 1955 Bowman football card.

No. 44, 66, 60
- Position: Offensive guard

Personal information
- Born: January 8, 1926; Memphis, Tennessee, U.S.
- Died: November 26, 2003 (aged 77); Los Angeles, California, U.S.
- Listed height: 6 ft 2 in (1.88 m)
- Listed weight: 225 lb (102 kg)

Career information
- High school: Los Angeles (CA)
- College: Los Angeles CC (1946); UCLA (1947–1949)
- NFL draft: 1950: undrafted

Career history
- Los Angeles Rams (1950–1954); Chicago Cardinals (1955)

Awards and highlights
- NFL champion (1951)
- Stats at Pro Football Reference

Harry Julius Thompson (January 8, 1926 – November 26, 2003) was an American professional football offensive guard who played six seasons in the National Football League (NFL) with the Los Angeles Rams and Chicago Cardinals. He played college football at Los Angeles City College and the University of California, Los Angeles.

== Early life and college ==
Harry Julius Thompson was born on January 8, 1926, in Memphis, Tennessee. He attended Los Angeles High School in Los Angeles.

Thompson first played college football for the Los Angeles City College Cubs in 1946. He transferred to play for the UCLA Bruins of the University of California, Los Angeles from 1947 to 1949, starting his final two years. He was a two-year letterman from 1948 to 1949.

== Professional career ==
Thompson signed with the Los Angeles Rams in 1950 after going undrafted in the 1950 NFL draft. He played in all 12 games, starting three, for the Rams during the 1950 season and recovered one fumble. He also played in two playoff games, starting one, that year. In 1951, Thompson appeared in 12 games, starting two. He also played in the 1951 NFL Championship Game, a 24–17 victory over the Cleveland Browns. He played in all 12 games for the third consecutive season, starting eight, for the Rams in 1952, and recovered one fumble. He also appeared in a playoff game that season. Thompson appeared in eight games, starting three, in 1953 and recovered two fumbles before being placed on injured reserve on December 1, 1953. He played in 12 games, starting a career-high 11, during the 1954 season and made one fumble recovery. He was released by the Rams on September 19, 1955.

Thompson signed with the Chicago Cardinals in 1955 and played in 12 games, starting two, for them during the 1955 season while recovering one fumble. He became a free agent after the season.

== Personal life ==
Thompson died on November 26, 2003, in Los Angeles, California.
