= Linda Levi =

American artist

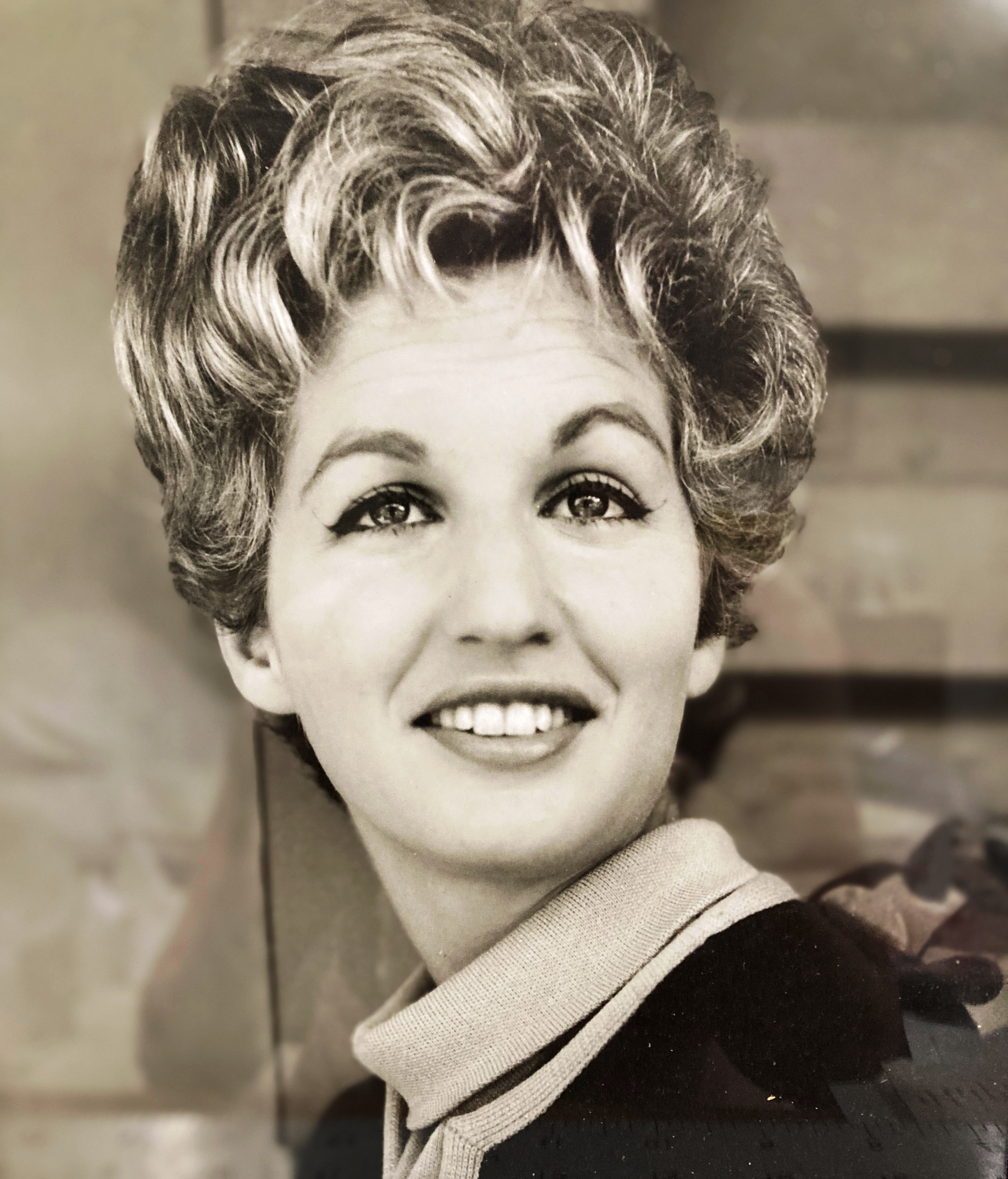
Linda Levi

Linda Levi (born 1935) is an American artist who lives and works in Los Angeles, California.

== Early life and education ==
Born in Los Angeles, Levi was educated at Los Angeles High School, University of California, Berkeley, and the University of California at Los Angeles, CA., (1958, BA. Cum laude 1960, MA)

== Art beginnings ==
She began as an abstract expressionist influenced by New York City, San Francisco, the artists at Ferus Gallery, Los Angeles, Ed Moses, Robert Irwin, Craig Kauffman many who were her friends, and teachers like Adolph Gottlieb and Richard Diebenkorn. In 1958, she traveled to New York and through artist Helen Frankenthaler, she met and visited with well-known artists Mark Rothko, Sam Francis, and Ibram Lassaw. In 1958 and 1959 she won painting and purchase awards at Los Angeles County Museum of Art and The Municipal Art Gallery, Barnsdale Park, Los Angeles. She was included in "Fifty Paintings by Thirty-seven Painters of the Los Angeles Area," UCLA Art Galleries, University of California, Los Angeles, CA. A 1960 survey of thirty years of Los Angeles Art curated by Henry T. Hopkins future Director of San Francisco Museum of Modern Art.

== New York City ==
She moved to New York in 1960, and leased the studio of Jon Schueler. She met Jon's friend, painter and critic, Herman Cherry, whom she dated, and sculptor Gabriel Kohn (exhibited at Leo Castelli), with whom she lived. Through these artists she met and became friends with leading abstract expressionist artists including Willem de Kooning and Reuben Kadish and his wife Barbara Weeks Kadish. With Kohn, she frequented the Cedar Tavern along with other artists of the day. She also had artist friends from Los Angeles, Jo Baer and Idelle Weber, who had moved to New York.

Her direction was changed after living in New York City from 1960. She saw that abstract expressionist was coming to an end and began to paint images around her like gas meters and cameras. But that was short-lived as she felt that abstract painting was still relevant.

== Los Angeles ==
Upon her return to Los Angeles, she began to paint abstract imagery using many mediums like paint, plastic, wood, and worked with light and kinetic movement. She had her first gallery show in 1965 at the Esther Robles gallery in Los Angeles. In the 1960s, she was part of the Los Angeles movement of plastic and light artists and was included in many exhibits dealing with these materials, i.e., the Museum of Contemporary Crafts, New York, "Plastics as Plastics," and Phoenix Art Museum, "Electric Art," 1969.

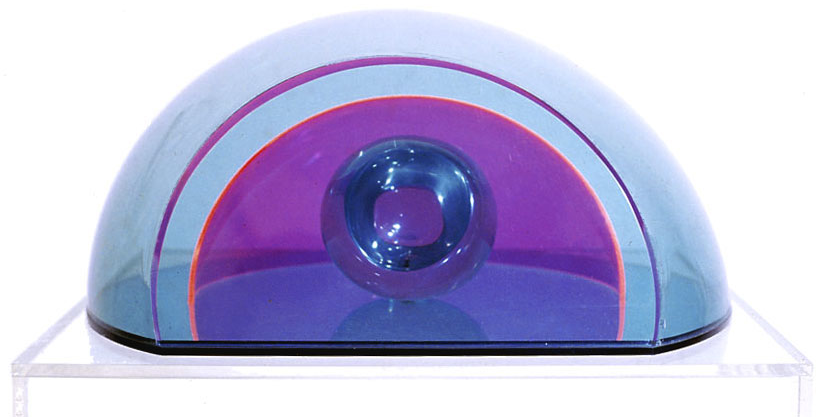
Hollywood Bowl 1967 resin, acrylic with vacuum formed (dimensions 12 5/6" x 14 3/4" x 6 1/4")

== The Women's Movement in Los Angeles ==
Early in the 1970s, she was contacted by her friend, Judy Chicago, and asked if she’d like to join a small group of women artists to discuss art and exhibit with them. The resulting exhibit "Twenty One Women Artists Invisible/Visible" at the Long Beach Museum of Art in 1972 was one of the first women artists’ shows. In 1972, Levi was a founding director of Womanspace in West Los Angeles, which was the first building in Los Angeles to exhibit and discuss women artists. She curated several exhibits there. Womanspace moved into Woman's Building when it opened in 1973 and closed in 1974. She had an exhibit at the Woman's Building in 1975 when it was at the old Chouinard Art Institute building.

In 1975, ABC television in Los Angeles aired a program called Search on which she lectured on "Women Artists of the Twentieth Century".

Levi continued to work with plastic material during the 1970s.

== The 1980s ==
In the 1980s, Levi used wood and other materials to create non-objective imagery and exhibited these in group shows and also a solo show named Cerritos College in 1984.

== The 1990s and 2000s ==
During the 1990s, she was one of the first fine artists to use the computer to create art, which she continued to do until the 2000s, using photographs digitally altered, and exhibiting the art at Orlando Gallery in Tarzana, California in 2005.

== Art exhibits ==
Levi has been included in many group shows, galleries, and museums and represented by many dealers over the course of her 40-year career including the San Francisco Museum of Modern Art, Esther Robles Gallery, Los Angeles, University of Nevada, Reno, Martha Jackson Gallery, New York City, Orlando Gallery, Los Angeles, Neuhaus Gallery, New York, California Institute of the Arts, and the Library of Congress.

== Personal life ==
Levi is the great-great-granddaughter of Los Angeles pioneer, businessman, real estate investor, and historian, Harris Newmark. The Newmark clan was one of the founding families of the Los Angeles area. Following in his footsteps in Spring, 2007, she authored for the Western States Jewish History quarterly an article entitled "Linda Levi, Growing Up as a 'Newmark' in Los Angeles, 1935–1950". In 2007, she donated Newmark and Levi papers and ephemera to the Autry National Center.

In 2014, Linda married her longtime partner and graphic designer Barbara Leif.

== Reviews ==
- Wurdemann, Helen. "Hopkins UCLA Show Outstanding." Los Angeles Mirror News Los Angeles Times, April. 1960.
- Seldes, Henry J. Art Walk, the Los Angeles Times, Fri. Nov.15, 1968, Part IV. Esther Robles Gallery.
- Nix, Marilyn, "Artists Invisible/Visible, Art Week, April 22, 1972, Volume 3 Number 17.
- Muchnic, Suzanne. "Plastic Perspective." Art Week, 1977
- Snyder Susan R. Los Angeles IV:3, 12–14 Nov.1965 Art Forum
- Danieli, Fidel " Setting The Scene for the Sixties." Images and Issues, Fall, 1981 pg. 37

== Bibliography ==
- Schueler, Jon (1999). The Sound of Slate: A Painter's Life. Picador, USA, pg. 84, 85. ISBN 0-312-20015-3
- Esther Robles Gallery records, Smithsonian Archives of American Art
- Newman, Thelma (1974). Plastics as Sculpture. Chilton Book Co. ISBN 978-0-8019-5767-3, 284pp
- Rubinstein, Charlotte Streifer (1990). American Women Sculptors: A History of Women Working in Three Dimensions. C.K. Hall pg.404 ISBN 0-8161-8732-0
- Rochlin, Harriet; Rochlin, Fred (2000). Pioneer Jews: A New Life in the Far West. New York: Houghton Mifflin, 126–129. ISBN 0-618-00196-4
- Schapiro, Miriam (1975). Art: A Woman's Sensibility., published by Feminist Art Program, California Institute of the Arts pg.44.
