= Broadway Tunnel (Los Angeles) =

Former tunnel in Los Angeles, California

Coordinates: 34°3′29″N 118°14′31″W

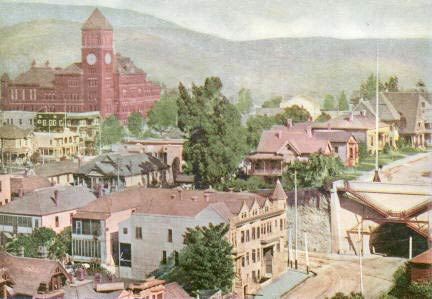
- The portal to the Broadway Tunnel under Fort Moore Hill is at lower right. Los Angeles High School is in upper left.
- Interactive map of Broadway Tunnel

Overview
- Location: Los Angeles, California, USA
- Status: Demolished for construction of Hollywood Freeway
- Route: North Broadway
- Start: Sand Street (later California Street), one block north of Temple Street
- End: North side of Fort Moore Hill

Operation
- Work began: November 2, 1899
- Opened: August 17, 1901
- Closed: June 2, 1949
- Owner: The city
- Character: Street traffic

Technical
- Length: 760 feet (230 m)
- No. of lanes: Two
- Tunnel clearance: 22 feet (6.7 m)
- Width: 40 feet (12 m)
- Grade: 6 in 100

The Broadway Tunnel was a tunnel under Fort Moore Hill in Downtown Los Angeles, California. It extended North Broadway (formerly Fort Street), at Sand Street (later California Street), one block north of Temple Street, northeast to the intersection of Bellevue Avenue (later Sunset Boulevard, now Cesar Chavez Avenue), to Buena Vista Street (now North Broadway).

== History ==
A proposal for opening Broadway through to Buena Vista Street and extending the street south into what was then part of Main Street, below Tenth Street — to give a continuous, wide thoroughfare from the southern city limits to the Eastside — was made as early as February 1891.

Plans were prepared by the city engineer's office in early March 1895. The main argument for its construction was that a tunnel providing an additional opening on the north would lessen the constantly increasing traffic (horses, buggies and wagons), which was causing a dangerous jam at the corner of First and Spring Streets.

=== Construction ===
Work began on the Broadway Tunnel on November 2, 1899. About 25 men with teams (of animals) moved obstructions out of the way in preparation for the excavation, from the north approach. On the morning of January 20, 1900, a laborer was buried under about 20 tons of earth at the north end of the tunnel. The wood bracing fell over the man in such a manner that he was saved from being crushed to death.

The tunnel required more than 50,000 cubic yards (38 227.75 m^{3}) of elevation, 4,000 cubic yards (3 058.22 m^{3}) of concrete and 1.25 million of bricks to line it. With the exception of the tunnel in Fairmount Park in Philadelphia, which was 41 feet (12 m) in diameter, but only 140 feet (43 m) long, the Broadway Tunnel was the widest tunnel of its type in the U.S., and possibly in the world, at that time. According to an article in the Los Angeles Times, the Third Street Tunnel, which was also nearing completion at the time, could have been put inside the Broadway Tunnel leaving enough room for a sidewalk 8 feet (2.4 m) wide.

The Broadway Tunnel was completed and opened for traffic on Saturday, August 17, 1901. It was 760 feet (230 m) long, 40 feet (12 m) wide and 22 feet (6.7 m) high, with a grade of 6 in 100, falling toward the east. The cost in its construction was $66,000.

=== Reconstruction ===
The Broadway Tunnel was closed for reconstruction in 1915. The roadway was lowered to decrease the grade, wood block flooring was installed to provide a noiseless surface for the traffic of teams and automobiles, and a false roof built inside the original shell. Because of the lowering, it was necessary to make a cut of 14 feet (4.3 m) in California Street, and to change the grade of North Broadway from Temple Street to the tunnel. The concrete archway of the Broadway Tunnel was 20 feet (6.1 m) high, and the entire bore was lined with white glazed tile. The stairway on the outer face of the southern portal was extended to a rise of 65 feet (20 m) to Fort Moore Hill.

The work was completed and the Broadway Tunnel reopened in early February 1916. Due to the importance of the artery of travel, through which thousands of automobiles, teams and pedestrians would be passing daily, an event was held on Saturday, February 19, formally turning the tunnel over to the city, with the Automobile Club of Southern California in charge.

=== Closure ===
The Broadway Tunnel was closed on June 2, 1949. It was demolished for the construction of the new Hollywood Freeway (U.S. Route 101) through Downtown. The route cut through Fort Moore Hill and made it necessary for a Broadway overpass to be built across the freeway at the former Broadway Tunnel site.
