= Fort Moore Pioneer Memorial =

Memorial in Los Angeles, California

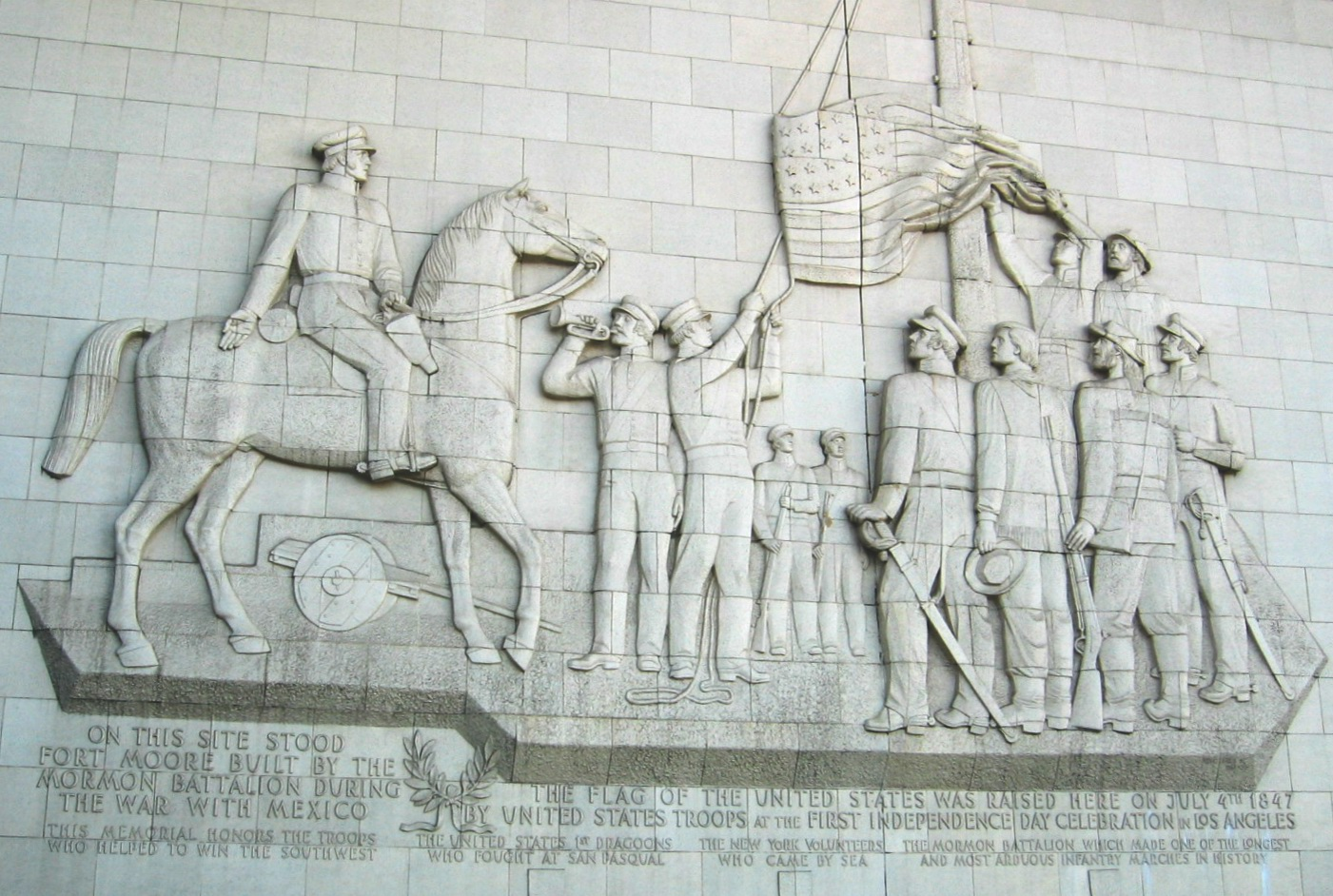
- Part of the memorial, 2006
- Interactive map of Fort Moore Pioneer Memorial
- Location: 451 North Hill Street; Los Angeles, California
- Coordinates: 34°3′30″N 118°14′31″W
- Designer: Kazumi Adachi; Dike Nagano; Henry Kreis; Albert Stewart
- Type: Memorial Wall
- Material: Stone; Terra cotta
- Length: 78 feet (24 m)
- Height: 45 feet (14 m)
- Opening date: July 3, 1957

The Fort Moore Pioneer Memorial is a large stone memorial wall built in 1957 on part of the original location of Fort Moore (named for Benjamin D. Moore) facing North Hill Street, in Los Angeles, California.

== Description and history ==
The memorial was completed in phases; while the art wall was completed in 1956, the pylon, waterfall and memorial wall were not completed until 1957 or 1958. The final funding was secured in 1957. The official dedication of the memorial was on July 3, 1958.

As the largest bas-relief military monument in the United States, it honors the Mormon Battalion, the U.S. 1st Dragoons, and the New York Volunteers who raised the American flag over the fort on July 4, 1847, at the first Independence Day in Los Angeles.

Funded by the County of Los Angeles, the City of Los Angeles, the Los Angeles Board of Education and the Department of Water and Power, the memorial was designed by Kazumi Adachi and Dike Nagano and dedicated on July 3, 1957. Featuring four different panels, a 78 feet (24 m) by 45 feet (14 m) terra cotta panel designed by Saltus Award-winner Henry Kreis is the most prominent feature and portrays the July 4 event.

Other panels represent the agricultural and spiritual foundation of the region; transportation that shaped the city at the end of the 19th century; and the crucial role that water and electricity play in a large modern city.

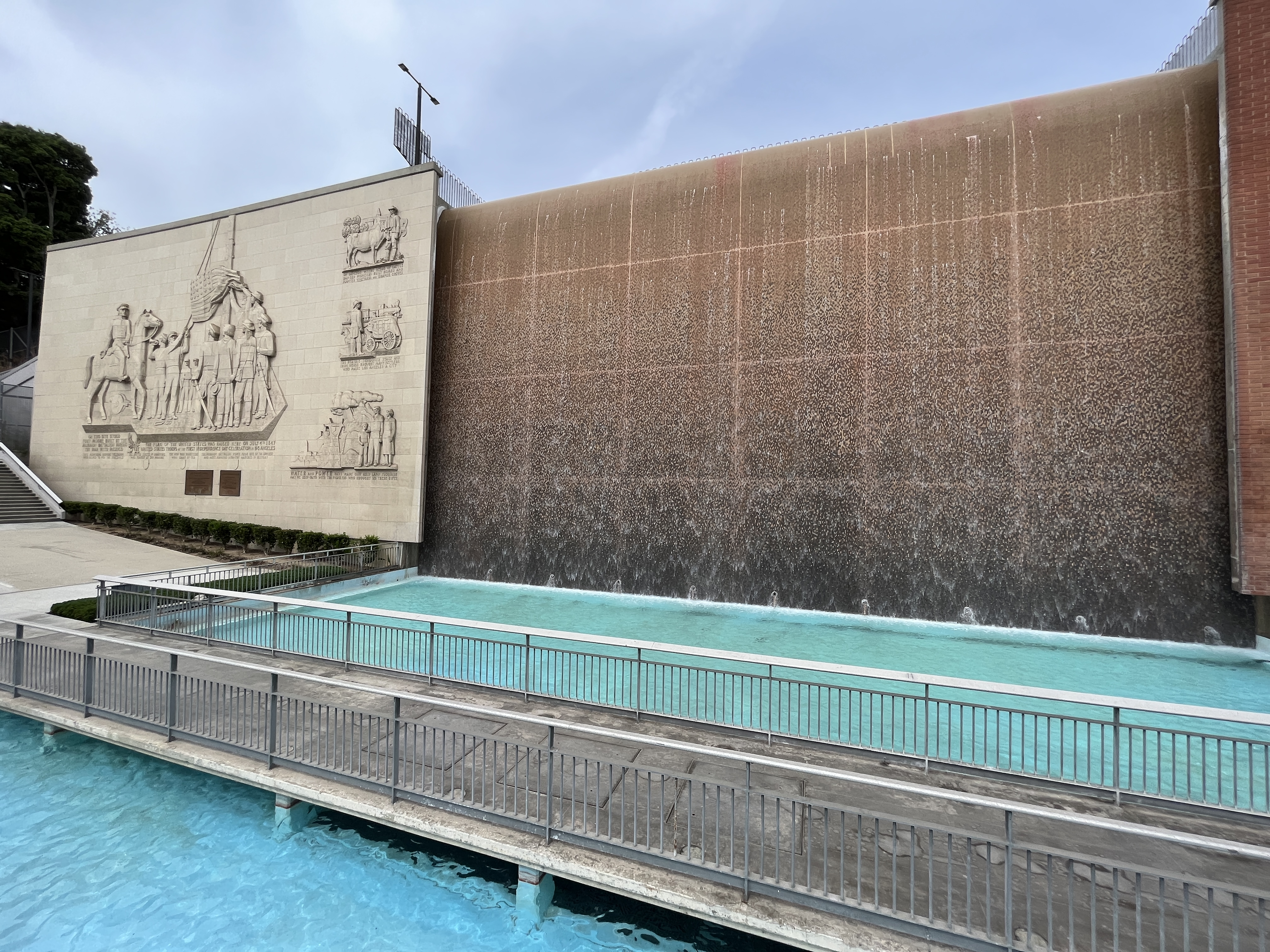
Water feature, 2022

An 80 feet (24 m) wide waterfall sits to the right of the panels. It was out of service since a 1977 drought, and turned on in December 2018 after restoration work was completed. The monument also includes a 279 feet (85 m) long brick facade that serves as a backdrop for a 68 feet (21 m) high pylon designed by noted American sculptor Albert Stewart. The pylon features a 16 feet (4.9 m) by 11 feet (3.4 m) American eagle as well as an incised relief on the low wall along the sidewalk depicting the 1,100-mile (1,770 km) march of the Mormon Battalion from Council Bluffs, Iowa, to Los Angeles.
