= Broadway Line =

Broadway Line refers to the following transit lines:

In Brooklyn

- Broadway Line (Brooklyn elevated) (rapid transit, now the BMT Jamaica Line); served by the J, M, and Z trains
- Broadway Line (Brooklyn surface) (bus, formerly streetcar)

In Manhattan

- BMT Broadway Line (rapid transit); served by the N, Q, R, and W trains
- IRT Broadway–Seventh Avenue Line (rapid transit); served by the 1, 2, and 3 trains
- Broadway Line (Lower Manhattan surface), Broadway and Amsterdam Avenue Line, Broadway and Columbus Avenue Line, and Broadway and Lexington Avenue Line (bus, formerly streetcar) on Broadway below Times Square
- Broadway and University Place Line, an older streetcar line using Broadway between Union Square and Times Square
- Broadway Line (Midtown Manhattan surface) (bus, formerly streetcar) on Broadway from 42nd Street to 125th Street
- Broadway-Kingsbridge Line (bus, formerly streetcar) on Broadway from near 169th Street to the Bronx
- Broadway and 145th Street Line (bus, formerly streetcar) on Broadway from near 169th Street to the city line

Elsewhere

- Broadway Line (Queens surface) (bus, formerly streetcar)
- Broadway Bus (Bayonne), New Jersey
- Broadway Line (Baltimore) (bus, formerly streetcar)
