= List of Pacific Electric lines =

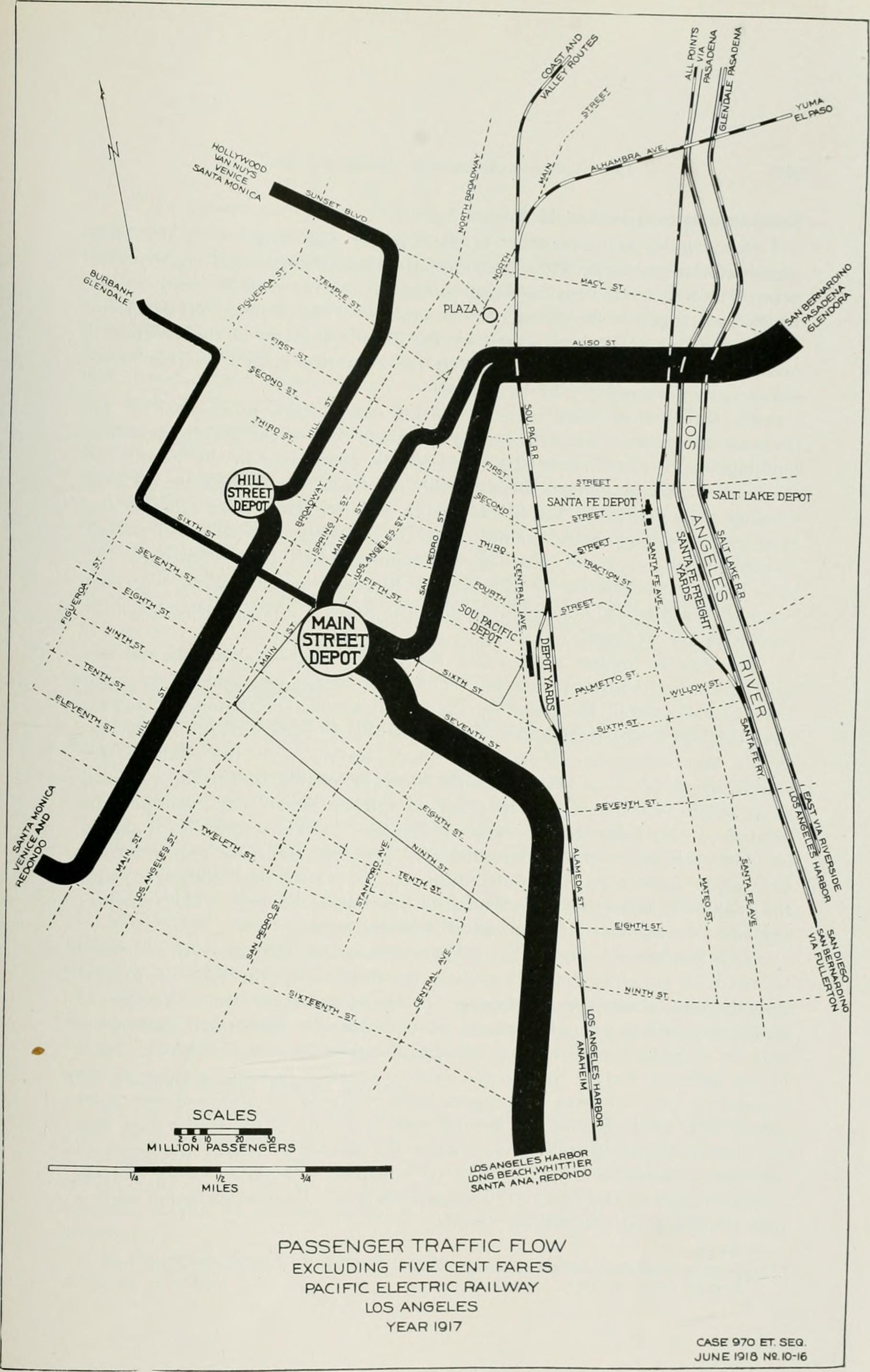
Pacific Electric lines emanating from Downtown Los Angeles, 1917

The following passenger rail lines were operated by the Pacific Electric Railway and its successors from the time of its merger in 1911 until the last line was abandoned in 1961. One count indicated that the company and its successors operated as many as 143 different routes in that time.

== List of lines ==
There were three primary terminals in downtown Los Angeles:

- 6th & Main Station, opened 1905 on the south side of 6th Street between Main and Los Angeles Streets; served the Northern and Southern Divisions via several approaches including an elevated line from Santa Fe Street. This elevated station was not built until about 1916.
- Hill Street Station, opened 1908 on the west side of Hill Street between 4th and 5th Streets; moved to the south side of the Subway Terminal in 1926; served the Western Division via both directions on Hill Street
- Subway Terminal, opened 1925 on the west side of Hill Street south of 4th Street; served the Western Division via the Hollywood Subway

Division	Name	Map	From	Via	To	Abandoned	Post-rail history
S	Walker		6th & Main	Long Beach Avenue, Randolph Street	Walker (west shore of the Los Angeles River)	March 6, 1938	N/A
S	Whittier		6th & Main	Long Beach Avenue, Randolph Street, private ROW, Philadelphia Street	Whittier	September 1, 1935 (cut back to Walker)	MTA Line 18, Montebello Bus Lines Line 10 (part of MTA Line 18 until 2004)
S	La Habra–Yorba Linda		6th & Main	Long Beach Avenue, Randolph Street, private ROW	Yorba Linda	July 10, 1930	MTA Line 18, Montebello Bus Lines Line 10 (part of MTA Line 18 until 2004), Foothill Transit Line 285 (MTA Line 471 until 2004), Orange County Transportation Authority Line 29 (replacement buses only went to Brea)
S	Fullerton		6th & Main	Long Beach Avenue, Randolph Street, private ROW	Fullerton	November 13, 1930	MTA Line 18, Montebello Bus Lines Line 10 (part of MTA Line 18 until 2004), Foothill Transit Line 285 (MTA Line 471 until 2004), Orange County Transportation Authority Lines 29, 47
S	Bellflower		6th & Main	Long Beach Avenue, Santa Ana Boulevard, private ROW	Bellflower	May 25, 1958	N/A
S	Santa Ana	enlarge…	6th & Main	Long Beach Avenue, Santa Ana Boulevard, private ROW, Fourth Street	Santa Ana	July 2, 1950 (cut back to Bellflower)	MTA Line 460, Orange County Transportation Authority Line 83
S	Santa Ana–Orange		Santa Ana		Orange	September 14, 1930	Orange County Transportation Authority Line 53
S	Santa Ana–Huntington Beach		Santa Ana		Huntington Beach	October 27, 1918	N/A
S	Huntington Beach–La Bolsa		Huntington Beach		La Bolsa	November 9, 1928	N/A
S	Seal Beach–Huntington Beach–Newport Beach		6th & Main	Long Beach Avenue, Willowbrook Avenue, private ROW, Electric Avenue, Pacific Coast Highway	Newport Beach	June 30, 1950	Orange County Transportation Authority Line 1
S	Balboa	enlarge…	6th & Main	Long Beach Avenue, Willowbrook Avenue, private ROW, Electric Avenue, Pacific Coast Highway, Balboa Boulevard	Balboa	June 9, 1940 (cut back to Newport Beach)	Orange County Transportation Authority Lines 1, 71
S	Long Beach		6th & Main	Long Beach Avenue, Willowbrook Avenue, private ROW, Long Beach Boulevard	Long Beach	April 9, 1961	MTA Line 60 and Blue Line
S	Watts Local		6th & Main	Long Beach Avenue	Watts	April 9, 1961	MTA Line 56 (discontinued in 2003)
S	Long Beach–San Pedro		Long Beach	Private ROW	San Pedro	January 2, 1949	MTA Line 232
S	Terminal Island		6th & Main; Long Beach	Long Beach Avenue, Willowbrook Avenue, private ROW, Henry Ford Avenue	Terminal Island	September 16, 1945	N/A
S	San Pedro via Dominguez	enlarge…	6th & Main	Long Beach Avenue, Willowbrook Avenue, private ROW	San Pedro	December 7, 1958	MTA Line 202
S	Catalina Dock		6th & Main	Long Beach Avenue, Willowbrook Avenue, private ROW	Catalina Dock	October 12, 1958 (also had service from Long Beach via the Long Beach-San Pedro Line until 1949-04-30)	N/A
S	Torrance		6th & Main	Long Beach Avenue, Lanzit Avenue, Vermont Avenue, 166th Street, Normandie Avenue, Torrance Boulevard	Torrance	January 14, 1940	N/A
S	San Pedro via Gardena	enlarge…	6th & Main	Long Beach Avenue, Lanzit Avenue, Vermont Avenue, 166th Street, Normandie Avenue, Torrance Boulevard, Cabrillo Avenue, Plaza del Amo, Normandie Avenue, Gaffey Street, private ROW	San Pedro	February 26, 1939 (cut back to Torrance; Carson Cutoff along Normandie Avenue had been abandoned on 1927-10-19, taking all trips through Torrance)	N/A
S	Redondo via Gardena		6th & Main	Long Beach Avenue, Lanzit Avenue, Athens Way, private ROW, Vermont Avenue, 166th Street, private ROW, 182nd Street, private ROW, Diamond Street, Catalina Avenue	Clifton	January 14, 1940	N/A
S	Hawthorne–El Segundo	enlarge…	6th & Main	Long Beach Avenue, Lanzit Avenue, private ROW, Grand Avenue	El Segundo	October 31, 1930	N/A
S	Hawthorne–El Nido		Hawthorne	Hawthorne Boulevard	El Nido	October 25, 1933	N/A
N	South Pasadena Local	enlarge…	6th & Main	Aliso Street, private ROW, Daly Street, Pasadena Avenue, Figueroa Street, Pasadena Avenue, Mission Street, Fair Oaks Avenue	Pasadena	January 2, 1935 (remained south of Mission Road until 1942-10-17)	MTA Line 176 (until June 2021) currently Line 258
N	Annandale		6th & Main	Aliso Street, private ROW, Daly Street, Pasadena Avenue, Figueroa Street, Avenue 64	Annandale	April 3, 1928 (1926-11-13 north of Adelaide Place)	formerly MTA Line 256 (until Dec 2024) currently Pasadena Transit Line 33
N	Pasadena Short Line		6th & Main	Aliso Street, private ROW, Soto Street, Huntington Drive, Fair Oaks Avenue	Pasadena	September 30, 1951	MTA Line 260
N	Pasadena via Oak Knoll		6th & Main	Aliso Street, private ROW, Soto Street, Huntington Drive, Oak Knoll Avenue, Lake Avenue	Pasadena	October 8, 1950	formerly MTA Line 485, currently MTA 662 & N/A
N	Mount Lowe		6th & Main	Aliso Street, private ROW, Soto Street, Huntington Drive, Fair Oaks Avenue, Colorado Boulevard, Lake Avenue, Mount Lowe Drive	Rubio Canyon (connecting with the Mount Lowe Railway)	September 15, 1936	N/A
N	Sierra Vista Line		6th & Main	Aliso Street, private ROW, Soto Street, Huntington Drive	Sierra Vista	September 30, 1951	MTA Lines 78 and 179
N	Lamanda Park		Pasadena	Colorado Boulevard	Lamanda Park	January 19, 1941 (cut back several blocks from Lamanda Park on 1936-03-01)	formerly MTA Line 181, currently Foothill Transit Line 187
N	Sierra Madre		6th & Main	Aliso Street, private ROW, Soto Street, Huntington Drive, Sierra Madre Boulevard	Sierra Madre	October 6, 1950	formerly MTA Line 487, now MTA Line 268
N	Monrovia–Glendora		6th & Main	Aliso Street, private ROW, Soto Street, Huntington Drive, Olive Avenue, Royal Oaks Drive, private ROW, 9th Street, private ROW	Glendora	September 30, 1951	MTA Line 179, Foothill Transit formerly Line 494, now Line 187
N	Alhambra–San Gabriel		6th & Main	Aliso Street, private ROW, Soto Street, Huntington Drive, Main Street, Las Tunas Drive; loop through San Gabriel via Mission Drive, Junipero Serra Drive	Temple City	November 30, 1941	MTA Line 78
N	Shorb	enlarge…	Pasadena	Fair Oaks Avenue, Huntington Drive, Main Street, Palm Avenue	Shorb	April 16, 1924	N/A
N	El Monte–Baldwin Park		6th & Main	Aliso Street, private ROW, Ramona Boulevard	Baldwin Park	October 15, 1950	Foothill Transit Line 190
N	Covina		6th & Main	Aliso Street, private ROW, Ramona Boulevard, Badillo Street	Covina	March 28, 1947 (cut back to Baldwin Park)	Foothill Transit Line 190
N	San Dimas		6th & Main	Aliso Street, private ROW, Ramona Boulevard, Badillo Street	Lone Hill	November 1, 1941 (cut back to Covina)	Foothill Transit Line 190, 492
N	San Dimas Local		Lone Hill	Private ROW	San Dimas	July 4, 1924	N/A
N	Pomona		6th & Main	Aliso Street, private ROW, Ramona Boulevard, Badillo Street, private ROW, White Avenue	Pomona	November 1, 1941 (cut back to Covina)	Foothill Transit Line 190, 492
N	Pomona–Claremont		Pomona	Garey Avenue, private ROW, 1st Street	Claremont	January 1, 1933	Foothill Transit Line 492
N	Upland–Ontario		Ontario		Upland	October 6, 1928	Omnitrans Line 83
N	Ontario–San Antonio Heights		Ontario		San Antonio Heights	November 1, 1924 (cut back from San Antonio Heights to La Cima on 1924-07-03)	N/A
N	Upland–San Bernardino		6th & Main		San Bernardino	November 1, 1941	Foothill Transit Line 190, 492, Omnitrans Lines 66, 14
N	Redlands		6th & Main		Redlands	July 20, 1936	Foothill Transit Line 190, 492, Omnitrans Lines 66, 14, 8
N	Highland		San Bernardino		Highland	September 1, 1933 (branch to Patton on 1924-06-01)	N/A
N	Arrowhead		San Bernardino		Arrowhead Springs	September 1, 1932	N/A
N	San Bernardino–Riverside		San Bernardino		Riverside	February 1, 1938	Omnitrans Line 215
N	Riverside–Rialto Line		6th & Main		Riverside	June 9, 1940	N/A
N	Riverside–Arlington		Riverside		Arlington	January 10, 1943	Riverside Transit Agency Line 1
N	Arlington–Corona		Arlington		Corona	August 11, 1931	Riverside Transit Agency Line 1
W	Redondo Beach via Playa del Rey	enlarge…	Hill Street	Hill Street, Venice Boulevard, Culver Boulevard, Vista del Mar Avenue, The Strand, Hermosa Avenue, Harbor Drive, Catalina Avenue	Clifton	May 12, 1940	Culver CityBus Line 7 (MTA Line 220 until 2006)
W	West 16th Street		Hill Street	Hill Street, Venice Boulevard (16th Street), San Vicente Boulevard	Vineyard (extended 1940-07-07 to Genesee Street)	September 17, 1950 (Vineyard-Genesee Street shuttle remained until 1950-10-01)	MTA Line 33
W	Venice Short Line		Hill Street	Hill Street, Venice Boulevard, Pacific Avenue, Neilson Way, Ocean Avenue	Santa Monica	September 17, 1950	MTA Line 33
W	Sawtelle		Hill Street	Hill Street, Venice Boulevard, San Vicente Boulevard, Burton Way, Santa Monica Boulevard	Santa Monica	July 7, 1940	MTA Line 4; also Line 27 (Burton Way) until 2002
W	Venice–Inglewood		Ocean Park	Private ROW, Ballona Street	Inglewood	September 13, 1919	N/A
W	Venice–Playa del Rey		Venice	Pacific Avenue	Playa del Rey	July 13, 1936	N/A
W	Westgate		Hill Street	Hill Street, Venice Boulevard, San Vicente Boulevard, Burton Way, Santa Monica Boulevard, private ROW, San Vicente Boulevard, Ocean Avenue	Santa Monica	June 30, 1940	Big Blue Bus Line 4 (MTA Line 22 until 2003)
W	Santa Monica Air Line	enlarge…	6th & Main	Long Beach Avenue, private ROW, Exposition Boulevard, private ROW	Santa Monica	November 26, 1953	Expo Line in 2016-5-20
W	Beverly Hills		Subway Terminal or Hill Street	Glendale Boulevard or Hill Street, Sunset Boulevard, Hollywood Boulevard, Marshfield Way, private ROW, Santa Monica Boulevard	Beverly Hills	September 26, 1954	MTA Line 217
W	Venice via Hollywood		Subway Terminal	Glendale Boulevard, Sunset Boulevard, Hollywood Boulevard, Marshfield Way, private ROW, Santa Monica Boulevard, Ocean Avenue, Neilson Way, Pacific Avenue	Venice	August 23, 1941	N/A
W	Laurel Canyon		Hill Street	Hill Street, Sunset Boulevard, Hollywood Boulevard, Marshfield Way, private ROW, Sunset Boulevard	Laurel Canyon	March 10, 1924	N/A
W	Soldiers' Home		Sawtelle	Private ROW	Soldiers' Home	1920	N/A
W	Coldwater Canyon		Beverly Hills	Rodeo Drive	Coldwater Canyon (Beverly Hills Hotel)	January 15, 1923	N/A
W	South Hollywood–Sherman		Subway Terminal	Glendale Boulevard, Sunset Boulevard, Santa Monica Boulevard	Sherman	May 31, 1953	MTA Line 4
W	Western and Franklin Avenue		Hill Street	Hill Street, Sunset Boulevard, Santa Monica Boulevard, Western Avenue, Franklin Avenue	Hollywood (Hollywood and Vine)	March 17, 1940	MTA Line 26 (removed from Franklin Avenue in 2006)
W	Brush Canyon		Hollywood	Bronson Avenue, Canyon Drive	Brush Canyon	August 6, 1918	N/A
W	Lankershim–Van Nuys		Subway Terminal	Glendale Boulevard, Sunset Boulevard, Santa Monica Boulevard, Highland Avenue, Hollywood Freeway, Vineland Avenue, Chandler Boulevard, Van Nuys Boulevard	Van Nuys	December 28, 1952	MTA Line 237
W	Owensmouth		Subway Terminal	Glendale Boulevard, Sunset Boulevard, Santa Monica Boulevard, Highland Avenue, Hollywood Freeway, Vineland Avenue, Chandler Boulevard, Van Nuys Boulevard, Sherman Way	Canoga Park (Owensmouth)	May 30, 1938	MTA Line 162
W	San Fernando		Subway Terminal	Glendale Boulevard, Sunset Boulevard, Santa Monica Boulevard, Highland Avenue, Hollywood Freeway, Vineland Avenue, Chandler Boulevard, Van Nuys Boulevard, Parthenia Street, Sepulveda Boulevard, Brand Boulevard	San Fernando	May 30, 1938	MTA Line 234
W	Echo Park Avenue		Hill Street	Hill Street, Sunset Boulevard, Echo Park Avenue	Elysian Heights	October 1, 1950	Downtown Area Short Hop Pico Union/Echo Park
W	Edendale Local		Subway Terminal	Glendale Boulevard	Edendale	June 17, 1955 (served Arcade Station via 6th Street, Figueroa Street, 2nd Street rather than Subway Terminal until 1940-09-08)	MTA Line 92
W	Glendale		Subway Terminal	Glendale Boulevard, Brand Boulevard	North Glendale	June 19, 1955	MTA Line 92
W	Burbank		Subway Terminal	Glendale Boulevard, Brand Boulevard, Glenoaks Boulevard	Burbank	June 19, 1955 (cut back from Eton Drive on 1940-11-24)	MTA Line 92
W	East Broadway		Subway Terminal	Glendale Boulevard, Brand Boulevard, Broadway	Glendale	December 24, 1946	MTA Lines 180, 217

=== Local lines ===
The Los Angeles Railway operated most local lines in central Los Angeles, but the Pacific Electric had local systems in a number of other areas:

East Washington
Long Beach
Pasadena
Pomona
Redlands
Riverside
San Bernardino
San Pedro
Santa Monica

=== Dual gauge track ===
The PE and the Los Angeles Railway shared some dual gauge 4 ft 8 1/2 in (1,435 mm)/3 ft 6 in (1,067 mm) track along Hawthorne Boulevard, on Main Street and on 4th Street.
