= Redondo Beach via Gardena Line =

Pacific Electric streetcar line (1911–1940)

Redondo via Gardena

Overview
- Owner: Southern Pacific Railroad
- Locale: Los Angeles, and the South Bay
- Termini: Downtown Los Angeles; Redondo Beach, California
- Stations: 40

Service
- Type: Interurban
- System: Pacific Electric
- Operator: Pacific Electric
- Rolling stock: PE 1000 Class (last used)
- Ridership: 319,602 (1938)

History
- Opened: November 12, 1911
- Closed: January 15, 1940

Technical
- Line length: 22.26 mi (35.82 km)
- Track gauge: 1,435 mm (4 ft 8 1/2 in) standard gauge
- Electrification: Overhead line, 600 V DC

Redondo via Gardena was a line of the Pacific Electric Railway. One of two routes to Redondo Beach, this one was faster than the Redondo Beach via Playa del Rey Line as a result of its routing along the quadruple-tracked Watts main line.

== History ==
The southern half of this line was built by the Los Angeles and Redondo Railway Company (not to be confused with similarly named Los Angeles, Hermosa Beach and Redondo Railway Company) as part of the narrow gauge Los Angeles and Redondo railroad between Los Angeles and Redondo Beach. When the Pacific Electric Railway acquired the Los Angeles and Redondo Railway, the northern half (north of Broadway and Hawthorne in the city of Hawthorne) went to the Los Angeles Railway and Pacific Electric converted the southern portion to standard gauge to be used as part of the Redondo Beach via Gardena Line. Full standard-gauge service to Redondo Beach began on November 12, 1911 with cars making the run to Clifton the following October. Inbound cars initially terminated at the front of the Pacific Electric Building, but the inbound terminal was changed to the rear in 1914 and then to the elevated concourse in 1916. On October 26, 1933, the line was split in the center segment, with half of all trips routed through Delta to increase service in that area following the abandonment of the Redondo Beach via Hawthorne Line.

The line between Delta and Strawberry Park was abandoned after February 26, 1939, effectively resuming the former frequency along the remaining line between Athens and Gardena. Passenger service ended on January 15, 1940. No replacement bus service was deemed necessary. By 1981, the remainder of the line had become the Southern Pacific Torrance Branch, with the segment between Gramercy Place and Clifton almost entirely removed. As of 2022 Union Pacific (successor to the Pacific Electric system) operates a small section in Gardena as a freight spur.

== Route ==
The line started at the Pacific Electric Building in Los Angeles and shared the Long Beach Line to Watts and the Hawthorne–El Segundo Line to the South Los Angeles Station. This line was originally double-tracked mostly within a private right of way on its entire length from Watts to Clifton (South of Redondo Beach).

Starting from the South Los Angeles Station (Broadway at 117th Street), the double track line ran south on private way east of and parallel to Figueroa Street. At 149th Street the private way turned southwesterly and ran parallel to and south of that street to Vermont Avenue and Compton Boulevard (Strawberry Park Station).

From Strawberry Park station, double track line turned south (left) and went on private way centered in Vermont Avenue south of Gardena Boulevard, the track curved to the west (right) parallel to and south of 166th Street. At Hermosillo Station (Normandie Avenue) the San Pedro via Gardena Line branched south on private way along the west side of Normandie Avenue.

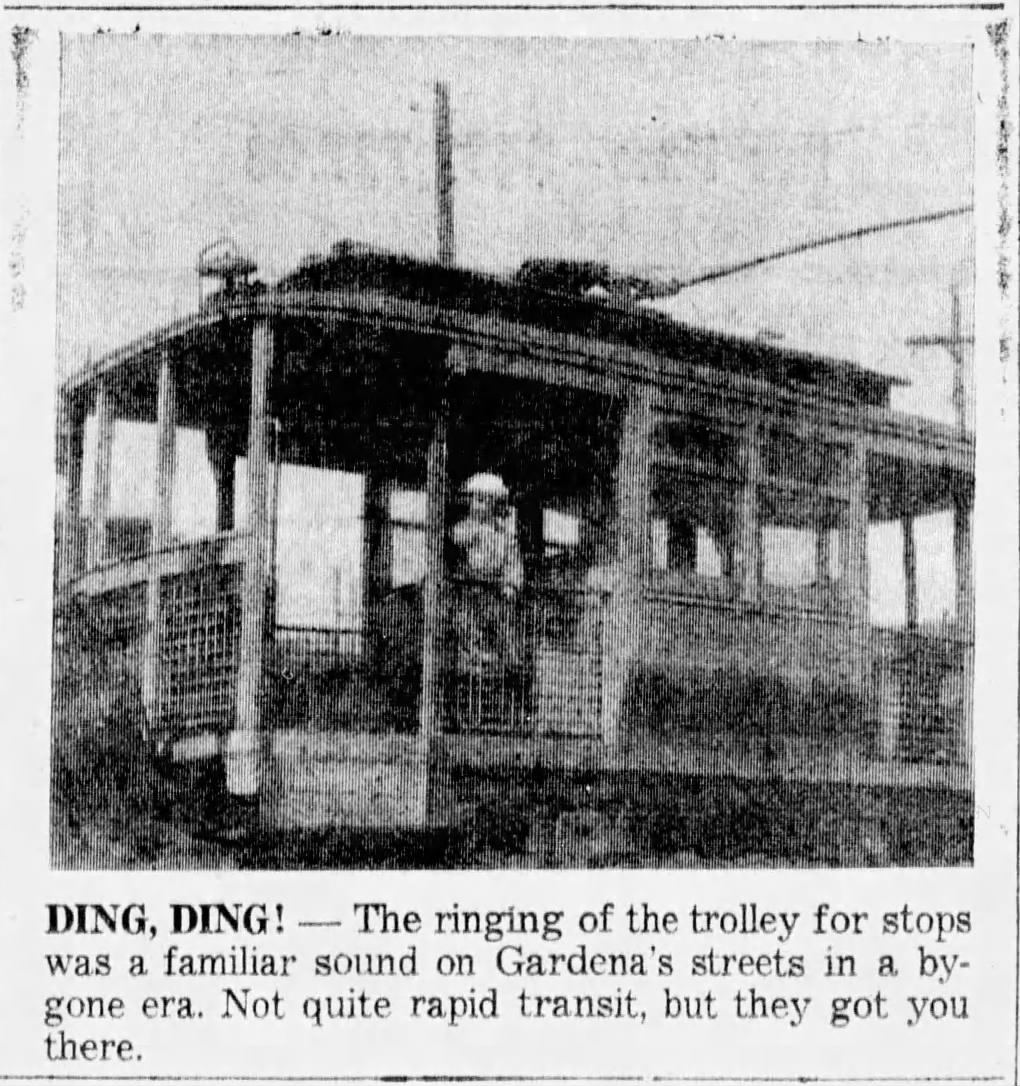
Undated photo of an unidentified trolley in Gardena, California

The Redondo Beach via Gardena Line continued west as a single track on private way parallel to 166th Street until reaching the Bridgedale Station (Crenshaw Boulevard) where it turned Southwest (left) and became double track. Crossing Prairie the line changed to single track and turned west (right) parallel to and north of 182nd street and continued within private way.

At El Nido Station (Kingsdale Avenue) the line joined the El Segundo–El Nido–Redondo segment from the north, turned southwest and became double track once again. The line crossed Prospect Avenue at Del Almo street, went westerly along what is now Del Almo Street, then turned southwesterly and leaving private way went along the center of Diamond street to Catalina Avenue where the single track Catalina cut-off went south (left) along Catalina Avenue to Pearl Street where it rejoined the Redondo Line.

The Redondo Line went one block further down Diamond street to Pacific Avenue where it joined the Redondo Beach via Playa del Rey Line at the Redondo Beach Station (Diamond & Pacific) across from what is now Fisherman's Wharf.

On the remainder of the line, the Redondo Beach via Gardena Line followed the route of the Redondo Beach via Playa del Rey Line to its terminus at Clifton.

The length of the line was 9.88 miles (15.90 km) from 6th and Main to South Los Angeles Station and 12.38 miles (19.92 km) from South Los Angeles Station to the Southern Terminus (Clifton) for a total length of 22.26 miles (35.82 km).

== List of major stations ==
Station	Mile	Major connections	Date opened	Date closed	City
Pacific Electric Building	0	Alhambra–San Gabriel, Annandale, Balboa, Fullerton, Hawthorne–El Segundo, La Habra–Yorba Linda, Long Beach, Monrovia–Glendora, Mount Lowe, Pasadena Short Line, Pasadena via Oak Knoll, Pomona, Redlands, Riverside–Rialto, San Pedro via Dominguez, San Pedro via Gardena, Santa Ana, Santa Monica Air Line, Sierra Madre, Soldiers' Home, South Pasadena Local, Upland–San Bernardino, Whittier; Los Angeles Railway B, H, J, R, 7, and 8	1905	1961	Los Angeles
Vernon Avenue	3.26	Balboa, Fullerton, Hawthorne–El Segundo, La Habra–Yorba Linda, Long Beach, San Pedro via Dominguez, San Pedro via Gardena, Santa Ana, Whittier; Los Angeles Railway V	1902	1961	Los Angeles
Slauson Junction	4.27	Balboa, Fullerton, Hawthorne–El Segundo, La Habra–Yorba Linda, Long Beach, San Pedro via Dominguez, San Pedro via Gardena, Santa Ana, Whittier	1902	1961	Los Angeles
Watts	7.45	Balboa, Hawthorne–El Segundo, Long Beach, San Pedro via Dominguez, San Pedro via Gardena, Santa Ana	1902	1961	Los Angeles
South Los Angeles (Forest)	9.88	Hawthorne–El Segundo, San Pedro via Gardena; Los Angeles Railway 7	1911	1940	
Delta	10.76	Hawthorne–El Nido; Los Angeles Railway F			
Athens	10.31	San Pedro via Gardena			
Strawberry Park	12.75	San Pedro via Gardena			
Gardena	13.57	San Pedro via Gardena	1911	1940	Gardena
El Nido	17.84	Hawthorne–El Nido	1911	1940	El Nido
Redondo Beach	20.89	Hawthorne–El Nido, Redondo Beach via Playa del Rey	1911	1940	Redondo Beach
Cliffton	22.26	Hawthorne–El Nido, Redondo Beach via Playa del Rey	1911	1940	Torrance

== See also ==
- Streetcar suburb
- Streetcars in North America
- List of California railroads
- History of rail transportation in California
