= San Pedro via Gardena Line =

Pacific Electric streetcar route (1903–1940)

San Pedro via Gardena
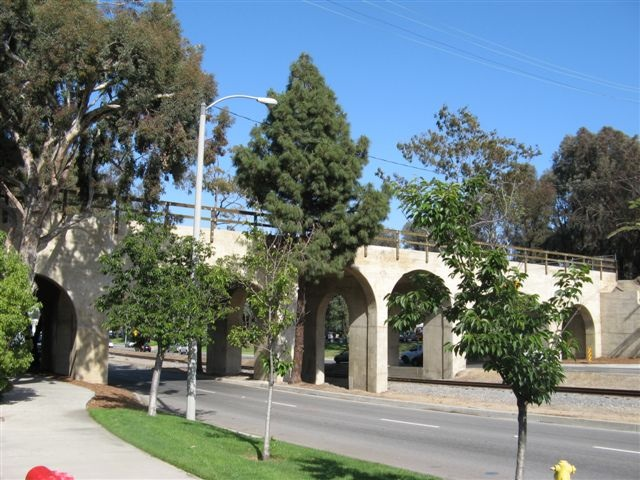
- The Pacific Electric Railroad Bridge in Torrance as seen in 2013

Overview
- Owner: Southern Pacific Railroad
- Locale: Los Angeles, and the South Bay
- Termini: Downtown Los Angeles; San Pedro, California
- Stations: 37

Service
- Type: Interurban
- System: Pacific Electric
- Operator(s): Pacific Electric
- Rolling stock: PE 1200 Class (last used)
- Daily ridership: 101,461 (last count)

History
- Opened: January 1903
- Closed: January 15, 1940

Technical
- Track gauge: 4 ft 8 1/2 in (1,435 mm) standard gauge
- Old gauge: 3 ft 6 in (1,067 mm)
- Electrification: Overhead line, 600 V DC

San Pedro via Gardena (also known as San Pedro via Torrance) was an interurban line of the Pacific Electric Railway. This was the railway's original route to San Pedro. The line was essential in the establishment of light industry in Torrance. The route closely paralleled the present-day Harbor Transitway.

== History ==
California Pacific, a subsidiary of the Los Angeles Traction Company, began interurban service to San Pedro over a narrow-gauge line in 1903. By 1908, Los Angeles Inter-Urban's San Pedro Line linked downtown Los Angeles to San Pedro, starting at Main and 3rd and running on 3rd, Hill, 16th, Burlington, Hoover, 24th, Vermont, then on a largely private right of way to San Pedro.

Pacific Electric assumed control of the railroad in 1911; the tracks north of Delta Junction were turned over to the Los Angeles Railway and became part of the F line. The route was converted to standard gauge (with some cutoffs made), and began operations on March 19, 1912. Cars also reached Torrance that year. Trips initially ran between Delta and San Pedro. The Carson Cutoff had largely fallen into disuse for passenger service by 1917. Through service to Los Angeles via the Watts Line was established by 1921 (though could have occurred as early as 1918). This supplanted the need for the Torrance via Athens service, which was discontinued.

Commencement of the San Pedro via Dominguez Line had steadily eroded ridership on the line. Through service north of Hermosillo was discontinued February 26, 1939 and service to San Pedro was heavily curtailed. The line south of Torrance was reduced to a single round trip to Harbor City in 1939, and passenger service was fully discontinued the following January.

The remainder of the line has become the Union Pacific Torrance Branch.

== Route ==
The line originated at the 6th and Main Street Station in Los Angeles and followed the Long Beach Line to Watts Junction, then the Redondo Beach via Gardena Line To South Los Angeles, and then the Hawthorne–El Segundo Line to Delta (Vermont Avenue at 117th Street). The line was entirely single track in private right of way from South Los Angeles to San Pedro.

The line turned south at Delta into the private right of way between the dual roadways of Vermont Avenue and ran to Strawberry Park (at Compton Boulevard). From Strawberry Park the line followed the double track Redondo Beach via Gardena Line south on Vermont Avenue, then turned west adjacent to 116th Street to Hermosillo (at Normandie Avenue).

From Hermosillo the San Pedro via Gardena Line turned south, crossed Normandie Avenue and entered private way on the west side of Normandie Avenue. The line ran south to Dolanco Junction (Del Amo Boulevard) where the Torrance loop line branched to the southwest. The line continued south to Ocean Avenue (228th Street) where the Torrance loop line rejoined the main line. The line continued south, crossed Sepulveda Boulevard, Pacific Coast Highway, and then turned to the southeast as it crossed the intersection of Gaffey Street and Anaheim Street where Normandie Avenue ended.

After crossing Anaheim Street, the line turned southerly and ran on the east edge of Gaffey Street, then crossed Wilmington Road and joined the San Pedro via Dominguez Line (West Basin Line) to run to San Pedro.

== List of major stations ==
Station	Mile	Major connections	Date opened	Date closed	City
Pacific Electric Building	0	Alhambra–San Gabriel, Annandale, Balboa, Fullerton, Hawthorne–El Segundo, La Habra–Yorba Linda, Long Beach, Monrovia–Glendora, Mount Lowe, Pasadena Short Line, Pasadena via Oak Knoll, Pomona, Redlands, Redondo Beach via Gardena, Riverside–Rialto, San Pedro via Dominguez, Santa Ana, Santa Monica Air Line, Sierra Madre, Soldiers' Home, South Pasadena Local, Upland–San Bernardino, Whittier; Los Angeles Railway B, H, J, R, 7, and 8	1905	1961	Los Angeles
Amoco Junction		Balboa, Fullerton, Hawthorne–El Segundo, La Habra–Yorba Linda, Long Beach, Redondo Beach via Gardena, San Pedro via Dominguez, Santa Ana, Santa Monica Air Line, Soldiers' Home, Whittier	1902	1961	Los Angeles
Vernon Avenue	3.26	Balboa, Fullerton, Hawthorne–El Segundo, La Habra–Yorba Linda, Long Beach, Redondo Beach via Gardena, San Pedro via Dominguez, Santa Ana, Whittier; Los Angeles Railway V	1902	1961	Los Angeles
Slauson Junction	4.27	Balboa, Fullerton, Hawthorne–El Segundo, La Habra–Yorba Linda, Long Beach, Redondo Beach via Gardena, San Pedro via Dominguez, Santa Ana, Whittier	1902	1961	Los Angeles
Watts	7.45	Balboa, Hawthorne–El Segundo, Long Beach, Redondo Beach via Gardena, San Pedro via Dominguez, Santa Ana	1902	1961	Los Angeles
South Los Angeles (Forest)	9.88	Hawthorne–El Segundo, Redondo Beach via Gardena; Los Angeles Railway 7	1903	1940	Los Angeles
Athens	10.31	Redondo Beach via Gardena			
West Athens	11.04				
Strawberry Park	12.75	Redondo Beach via Gardena			
Gardena	13.57	Redondo Beach via Gardena	1903	1940	Gardena
Hermosillo	14.37				
Dolanco			1903	1940	Carson
Torrance	17.93		1903	1940	Torrance
Weston Street	21.15				
Harbor City	21.36				
San Pedro	25.77	La Rambla, Long Beach–San Pedro, Point Fermin, San Pedro via Dominguez	1902	1961	San Pedro
