= Balboa Line =

Pacific Electric streetcar line (1904-1950)

Balboa
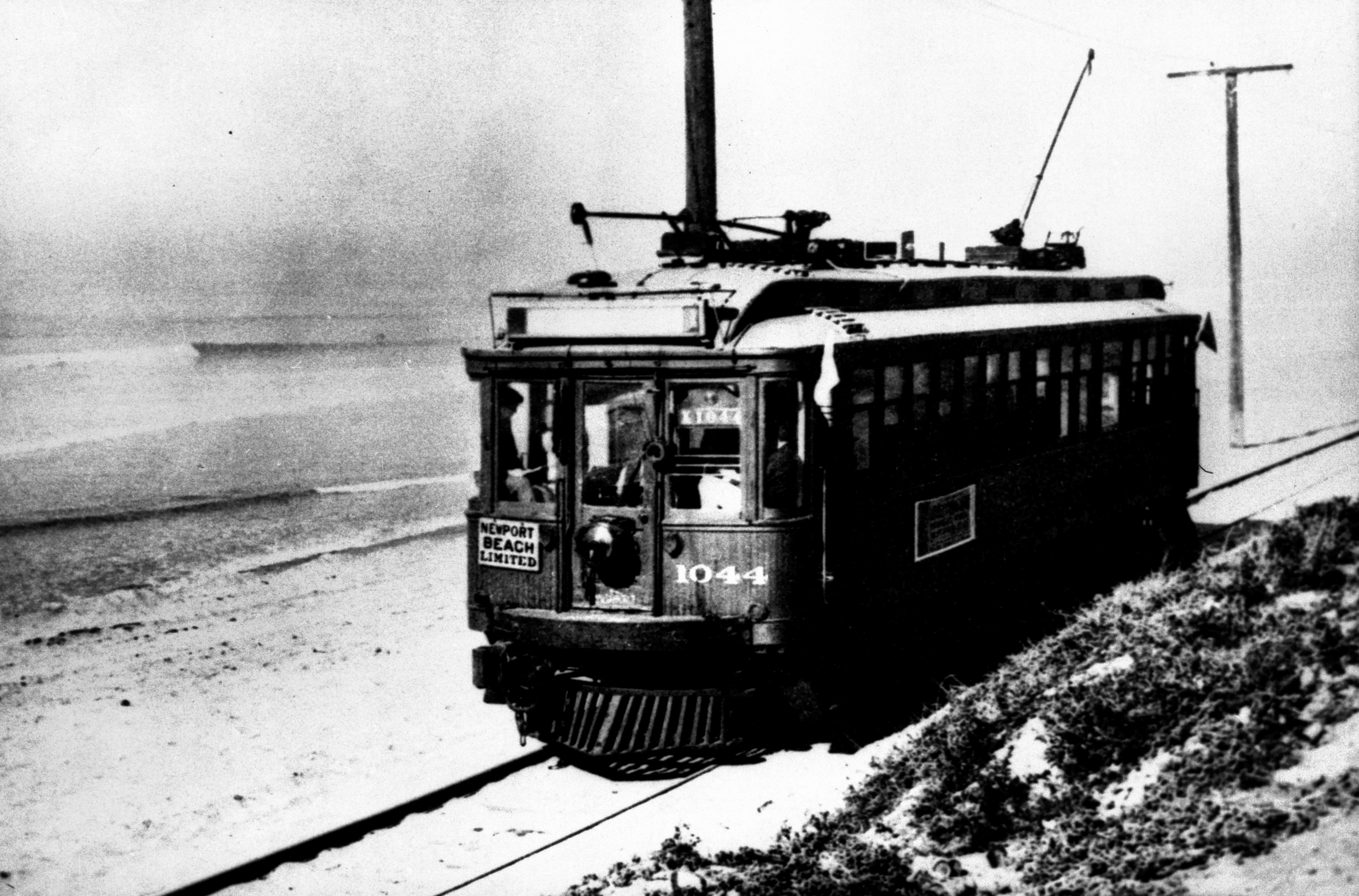
- Newport Beach Limited at Huntington Beach (undated)

Overview
- Owner: Pacific Electric
- Locale: Southern California
- Termini: Pacific Electric Building; Balboa
- Stations: 50

Service
- Type: Interurban
- System: Pacific Electric
- Operator: Pacific Electric
- Ridership: 55,390 (1948)

History
- Opened: June 24, 1904 (to Huntington Beach); July 4, 1906 (to Balboa)
- Closed: June 30, 1950

Technical
- Line length: 39.66 mi (63.83 km)
- Number of tracks: 1–4
- Track gauge: 4 ft 8 1/2 in (1,435 mm) standard gauge
- Electrification: Overhead line, 600 V DC

The Balboa Line was the southernmost route of the Pacific Electric Railway. It ran between Downtown Los Angeles and the Balboa Peninsula in Orange County by way of North Long Beach, though the route was later cut back to the Newport Dock. It was designated as route 17.

== History ==
Originally planned by the Pacific Electric, the line was turned over to the Los Angeles Inter-Urban Electric Railway in 1904. The company opened the line to Huntington Beach on July 4, 1904, reaching Newport Wharf the following year. The Los Angeles Inter-Urban was acquired by Pacific Electric in 1908.

The Newport Beach to Balboa segment was reduced to a single daily round trip in June 1940 and was fully abandoned on November 18 of that year. This started a series of service abandonments and restorations — all Newport trains were discontinued on that date. In July 1942, passenger service was briefly restarted with runs of the club car Commodore, lasting just under two months. Service was fully restored on May 2, 1943 as a way to move workers for the war effort and Pacific Electric lacked motor coaches to do so; trains ran between Huntington and Long Beach, where passengers transferred to Long Beach Line cars. By July, morning and evening runs were discontinued, as noise from the interurban line interfered with the United States Navy submarine listening post at Seal Beach. Service was fully discontinued at the end of September under further direction by the Navy. Rush Hour service began again in June 1944, but was discontinued after three months. A fifth restoration with a more comprehensive schedule started in June 1945, but service was again discontinued after three months.

June 1946 brought the last incarnation of the line. By mid-1948, Pacific Electric had purchased the requisite Southern Pacific Railroad lines to allow them to move freight to Newport and Huntington without the trip through Long Beach and Sunset Beach. Commodore service lasted seasonally until September 1949, its final run. The last passenger train on the line ran to Newport from Los Angeles on June 30, 1950.

Though ridership early on was very high, it had slowly dwindled to 55,390 in 1948.

Freight service along the route continued after passenger operations ended. The bridge between Seal Beach and Long Beach was removed in 1958. Demand had dwindled by 1960, and the route was formally abandoned in 1962. Trackage in Newport Beach was removed in 1977.

=== After abandonment ===
Since closure of the rail line, the beach route between Long Beach and Balboa has become heavily trafficked, and plans to revive rail service along this corridor have been proposed sporadically. The Long Beach Green Belt path occupies 11 acres (4.5 ha) of the corridor in Belmont Heights. The Jenni Rivera Memorial Park also occupies a segment of the right of way in Long Beach. The former path through Seal Beach was converted to a greenway; the Seal Beach Historical Society operated the Red Car Museum out of a former Pacific Electric tower car located on the pathway from 1981 until 2021.

== Service ==
The route ran "flyer" service between Downtown Los Angeles and Willowville (a route also served by the Long Beach Line), making flag stops only at Vernon, Slauson, Watts, Compton and Dominguez Junction.

=== Commodore ===
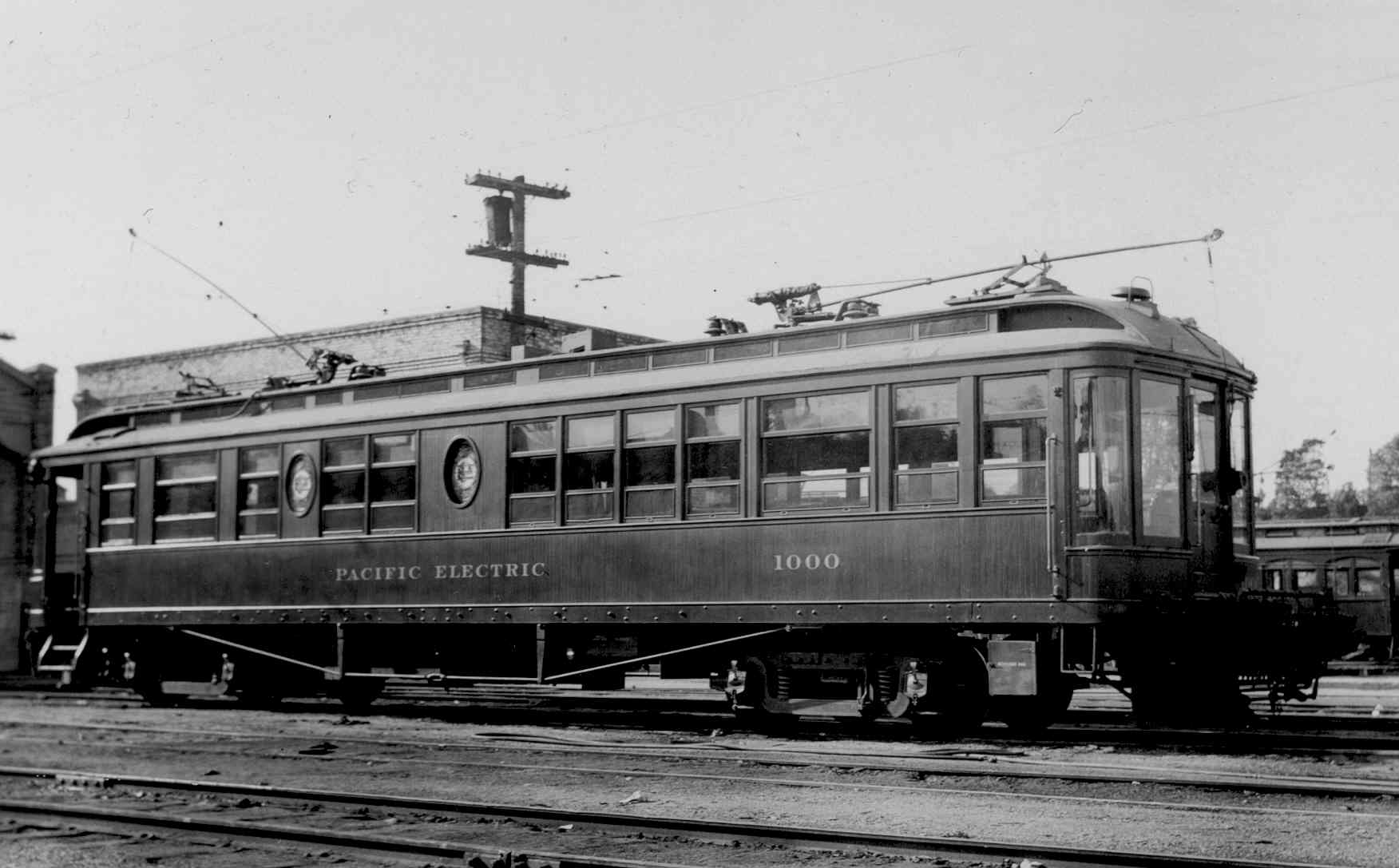
Pacific Electric Car 1000, the first Commodore

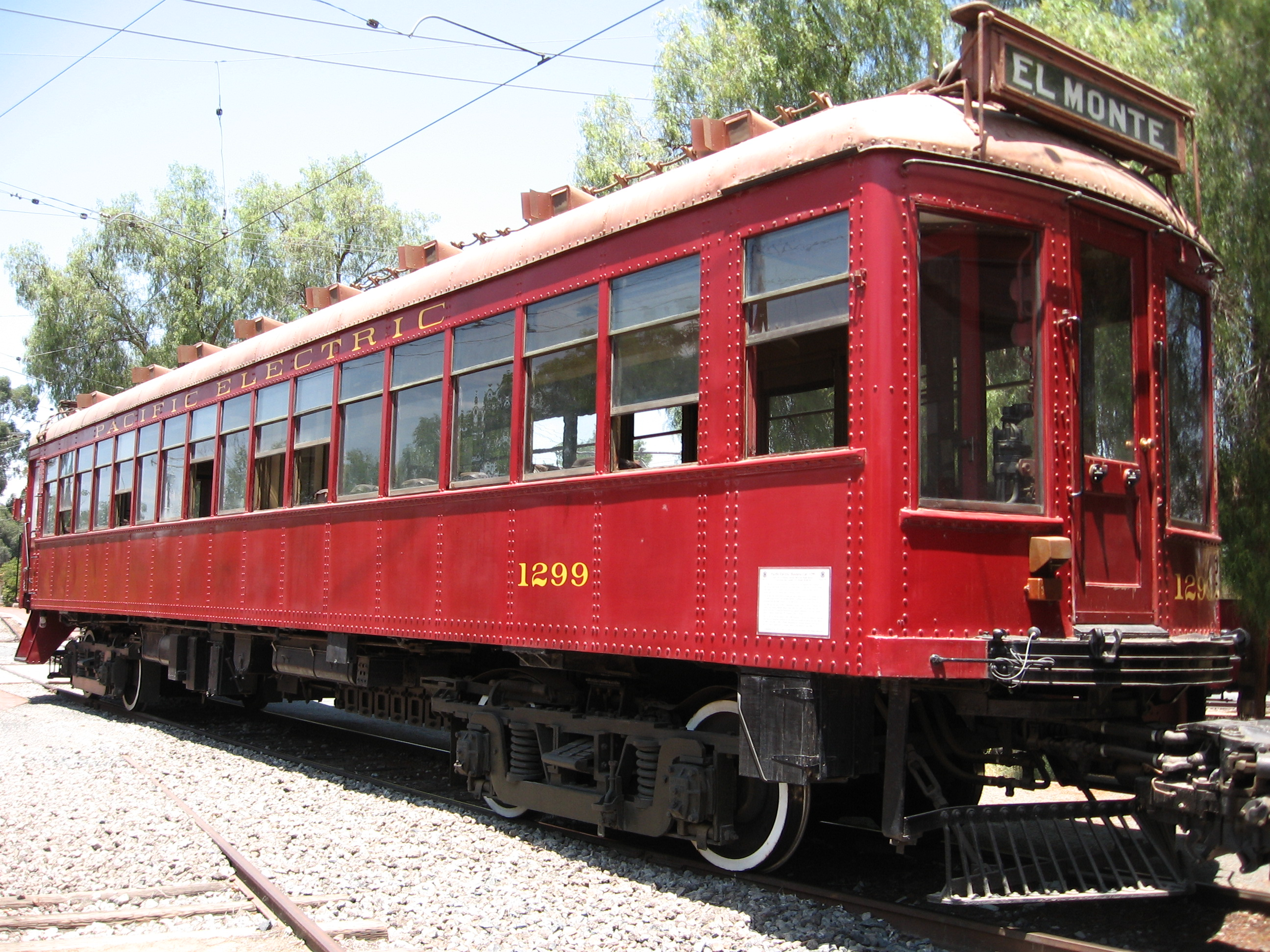
Pacific Electric Car 1299, the Commodore parlor car from the 1942 season until its discontinuance

The Commodore was a parlor car which ran a limited schedule during the summer seasons. It was the only such service operated by Pacific Electric. Beginning in 1936, the special was intended to attract commuters with summer homes in the area. Passenger paid a 35¢ premium (equivalent to $8 in 2025) per trip, or could acquire a weekly pass for $6.75 (equivalent to $157 in 2025) which was also accepted for regular trips on the line. Initial Commodore runs called at Balboa, Newport Beach, Huntington Beach, and Long Beach before continuing nonstop to Los Angeles. By the end of its life in 1949, the car only called at Huntington Beach between Newport and Los Angeles.

== Route ==
The Balboa Line followed the Long Beach Line as far as North Long Beach (Willow Street). From that junction the line branched southwesterly on dual tracks across American Avenue (Long Beach Boulevard) to enter a private right of way which cut diagonally across the city street grid of Long Beach and also forms part of the boundary of Long Beach and the City of Signal Hill.

The line crossed Atlantic Ave. at grade and passed under Orange Ave. Continuing southeasterly the line crossed at grade: Cherry Avenue, the Pacific Coast Highway, Temple Street, Anaheim Street, Redondo Avenue, Seventh Street, and Ximeno Avenue.

The dual tracks on private way then skirted the Colorado Lagoon and paralleled Appian Way (by the Marine Stadium) from Nieto Avenue to the San Gabriel River in Long Beach, and used three wooden trestle bridges in crossing Alamitos Bay and the river. East of the San Gabriel River the line entered Seal Beach in private way in the center of Electric Avenue, and up to 1942, crossed Anaheim Bay on a trestle to Surfside and Sunset Beach. In 1942, construction of the U.S. Naval Ammunition and Net Depot caused the line to be rerouted north from Electric Avenue on 17th Street to the Ocean Side of Pacific Coast Highway around Anaheim Bay to Sunset Beach.

The tracks followed a private right of way south of Pacific Coast Highway to Phillips Street and then turned onto another private right of way dividing Pacific Avenue in Surfside and Sunset Beach. The line then ran along Pacific Avenue through Surfside and Sunset Beach. Leaving Sunset Beach the line followed a private way between Pacific Coast Highway and the ocean to the Pacific Electric station on the south side of Ocean Avenue at Main Street in Huntington Beach.

The line was double track to Huntington Beach and single track from there to Balboa.

From Huntington Beach the line continued on a private way on the Ocean side of Pacific Coast Highway to approximately 59th Street in Newport Beach, where the line entered a private right of way dividing Seashore Drive. At 32nd Street the tracks curved into Newport Boulevard. At McFadden Place the line entered a private right of way dividing Balboa Boulevard, and continued on Balboa Boulevard to the terminus of the line at Main Street in Balboa.

=== List of major stations ===
Station	Mile	Major connections	Date opened	Date closed	City
Los Angeles; Pacific Electric Building	0	Alhambra–San Gabriel, Annandale, Fullerton, Hawthorne–El Segundo, La Habra–Yorba Linda, Long Beach, Monrovia–Glendora, Mount Lowe, Pasadena Short Line, Pasadena via Oak Knoll, Pomona, Redlands, Redondo Beach via Gardena, Riverside–Rialto, San Pedro via Dominguez, San Pedro via Gardena, Santa Ana, Santa Monica Air Line, Sierra Madre, Soldiers' Home, South Pasadena Local, Upland–San Bernardino, Whittier; Los Angeles Railway B, H, J, R, 7, and 8	1905	1961	Los Angeles
Amoco		Fullerton, Hawthorne–El Segundo, La Habra–Yorba Linda, Long Beach, Redondo Beach via Gardena, San Pedro via Dominguez, San Pedro via Gardena, Santa Ana, Santa Monica Air Line, Soldiers' Home, Whittier	1902	1961	Los Angeles
Slauson Junction	4.27	Fullerton, Hawthorne–El Segundo, La Habra–Yorba Linda, Long Beach, Redondo Beach via Gardena, San Pedro via Dominguez, San Pedro via Gardena, Santa Ana, Whittier	1902	1961	Los Angeles
Watts	7.45	Hawthorne–El Segundo, Long Beach, Redondo Beach via Gardena, San Pedro via Dominguez, San Pedro via Gardena, Santa Ana	1902	1961	Los Angeles
Compton	10.92	Long Beach, San Pedro via Dominguez	1902	1961	Compton
Dominguez Junction	13.31	Long Beach, San Pedro via Dominguez	1902	1961	Rancho Dominguez
Willowville	17.52	Long Beach	1902	1961	Long Beach
Zaferia	20.11		1904	1950	Long Beach
Alamitos Heights		Alamitos Heights	1904	1950	Long Beach
Naples	23.00		1904	1950	Long Beach
Seal Beach	24.11	Alamitos Bay	1904	1950	Seal Beach
Anaheim Landing	24.61				
Sunset Beach	26.70		1904	1950	Huntington Beach
Huntington Beach	32.46	Huntington Beach–La Bolsa, Santa Ana–Huntington Beach	1904	1950	Huntington Beach
Newport Beach	37.82		1905	1950	Newport Beach
East Newport	38.53			1940	Newport Beach
Balboa	39.66		1906	1940	Newport Beach
