= Hawthorne–El Segundo Line =

Pacific Electric streetcar line (1914–1930)

Hawthorne–El Segundo
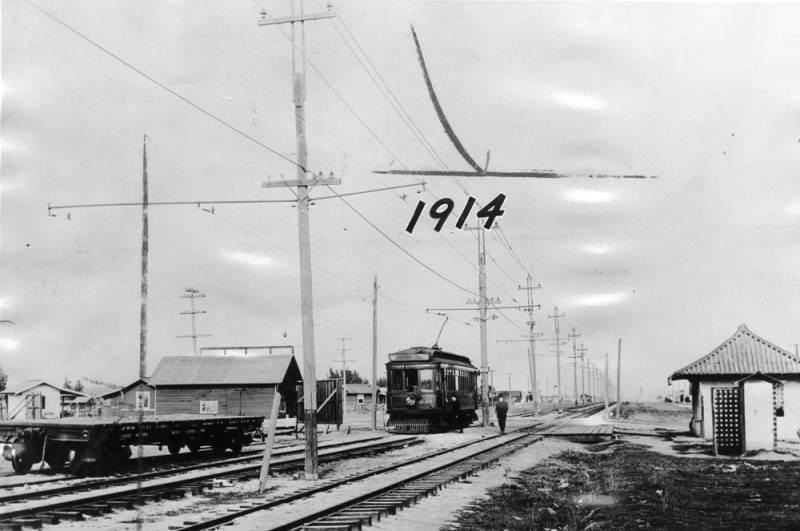
- El Segundo, 1914

Overview
- Owner: Southern Pacific Railroad
- Locale: Los Angeles, and the South Bay
- Termini: Downtown Los Angeles; El Segundo, California
- Stations: 22

Service
- Type: Interurban
- System: Pacific Electric
- Operator(s): Pacific Electric
- Rolling stock: PE 1000 Class (last used)
- Ridership: 304,996 (1926)

History
- Opened: August 9, 1914
- Closed: October 31, 1930

Technical
- Line length: 18.87 miles (30.37 km)
- Track gauge: 1,435 mm (4 ft 8 1/2 in) standard gauge
- Electrification: Overhead line, 600 V DC

The Hawthorne–El Segundo Line was an interurban railway route of the Pacific Electric Railway. It was built to transport oil from the Standard Oil Refinery in El Segundo and also saw passenger service. Unlike most corridors which hosted Pacific Electric passengers, the line remains largely intact as the Union Pacific El Segundo Industrial Lead.

== Route ==
The line was within private right of way for the entire route. The segment between Watts Junction and South Los Angeles (Broadway at 117th Street) was double track, though the double tracking has been reduced to a siding in modern times. The remainder of the line to El Segundo is single track.

The line starts at Watts Junction on the former quadruple-track Watts Line (present Los Angeles Metro A Line and Wilmington Subdivision) then went west with two tracks to South Los Angeles (Broadway at 117th Street) where the Redondo Beach via Gardena Line and the San Pedro via Gardena Line branched off to the south between Broadway and Figueroa with two tracks.

The single track Hawthorne–El Segundo Line went west between 116th Street and 117th Street past Figueroa Street where a transfer to the Los Angeles Railway F Line could be made to the north to Los Angeles. Then on west to Delta (Vermont Avenue) where the Delta–Strawberry Park Segment went south on Vermont to Gardena, Torrance and Redondo and a transfer could be made to the Los Angeles Railway Vermont Line to the north to Los Angeles.

The line continues westerly passing under Western Avenue (Westbridge) then southwesterly to Crenshaw Boulevard (Cypave Station) where the line turns to the west again. The line continues to the west, north of and parallel to El Segundo Boulevard where it crosses Hawthorne Boulevard.

At Hawthorne Boulevard (Hawthorne) the Hawthorne–El Nido segment and the El Segundo–El Nido–Redondo Line went to the south and a transfer to the Los Angeles Railway line could be made to travel north to Inglewood and west Los Angeles.

The line turns to the southwest and crosses El Segundo Boulevard at La Cienega Boulevard continuing to Wise (Douglas Avenue at Utah Avenue) where the track crosses the BNSF (succenssor to the Atchison, Topeka and Santa Fe Railway) Harbor Subdivision track at grade. Here also was Wise Transfer where a car exchange between the Pacific Electric and the ATSF could be made.

The removed end of the line turned northwesterly at Wise and passed through the oil fields and turned westerly at Calvert (Pine Avenue and Center Street) and continued to the end of the line at the El Segundo Station (Eucalyptus Drive and Main Street).

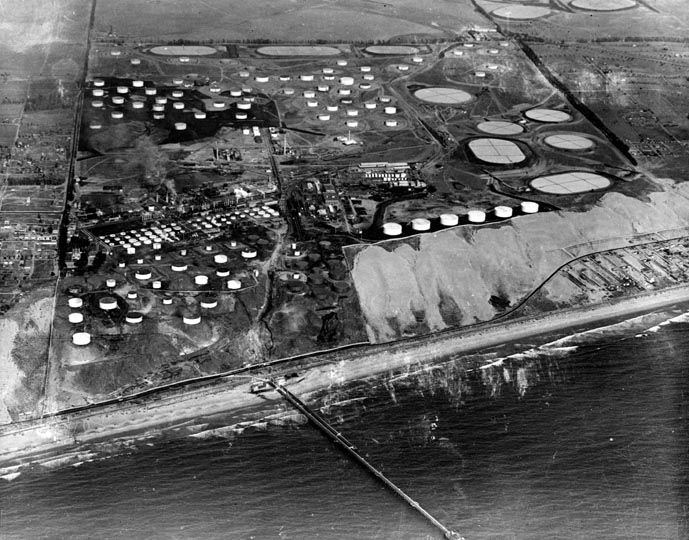
The line to El Segundo was constructed primarily to transport oil from the Standard Oil Refinery, seen here in 1920. (The Hawthorne–El Segundo Line is at the upper right.)

The "Standard Oil Spur", a lead extending westerly from Wise through the Standard Oil Refinery became the main line under Southern Pacific. The spur formerly ran to the Standard Oil Wharf and the Redondo Beach via Playa del Rey Line south of Hyperion.

== History ==
El Segundo was established as a company town for Standard Oil. When the company announced the location of their new refinery in 1911, Pacific Electric began planning of a spur line of the Redondo Beach via Gardena Line east of Delta Junction. The new line had been surveyed by 1913, and it was opened to downtown El Segundo with a barbecue feast on August 9, 1914. Direct service from El Segundo to Los Angeles was offered from 1920 to 1924, but the route mainly operated as a shuttle with transfers at Hawthorne.

Revenue service ended after Halloween 1930 due to low passenger usage, but freight service on the line continued to be a major revenue source for Pacific Electric. Tracks in downtown El Segundo had been removed by 1981, but Southern Pacific steam and diesel locomotives continued to serve the length of the line from Watts to the Standard Oil Refinery (later Chevron). Southern Pacific was merged into the present Union Pacific Railroad and the line continues to see freight service as the El Segundo Industrial Lead.

== List of major stations ==
Station	Major connections	Date opened	Date closed	City
Pacific Electric Building	Alhambra–San Gabriel, Annandale, Balboa, Fullerton, La Habra–Yorba Linda, Long Beach, Monrovia–Glendora, Mount Lowe, Pasadena Short Line, Pasadena via Oak Knoll, Pomona, Redlands, Redondo Beach via Gardena, Riverside–Rialto, San Pedro via Dominguez, San Pedro via Gardena, Santa Ana, Santa Monica Air Line, Sierra Madre, Soldiers' Home, South Pasadena Local, Upland–San Bernardino, Whittier; Los Angeles Railway B, H, J, R, 7, and 8	1905	1961	Los Angeles
Slauson Junction	Balboa, Fullerton, La Habra–Yorba Linda, Long Beach, Redondo Beach via Gardena, San Pedro via Dominguez, San Pedro via Gardena, Santa Ana, Whittier	1902	1961	Los Angeles
Watts	Balboa, Long Beach, Redondo Beach via Gardena, San Pedro via Dominguez, San Pedro via Gardena, Santa Ana	1902	1961	Los Angeles
Forest	Redondo Beach via Gardena, San Pedro via Gardena; Los Angeles Railway 7	1911	1940	Los Angeles
Delta	San Pedro via Gardena	1911	1940	Los Angeles
Hawthorne	Hawthorne–El Nido; Los Angeles Railway 5	1914	1930	Hawthorne
