= San Pedro via Dominguez Line =

San Pedro via Dominguez
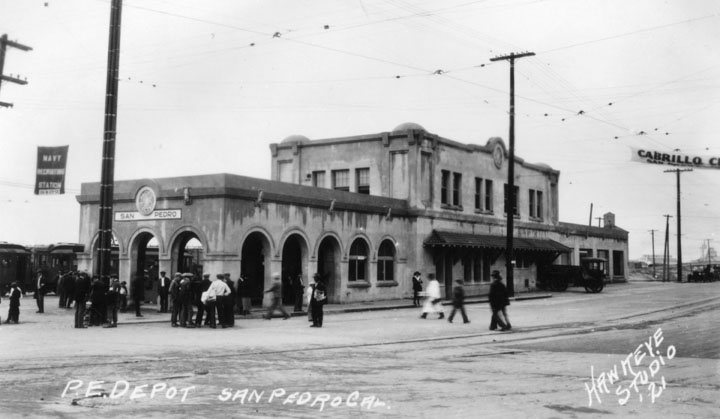
- The San Pedro Pacific Electric Railway station, located at 510 S. Harbor Boulevard, seen in 1921

Overview
- Owner: Southern Pacific Railroad
- Locale: Los Angeles and the South Bay
- Termini: Downtown Los Angeles; San Pedro, California
- Stations: 30

Service
- Type: Interurban
- System: Pacific Electric
- Operator(s): Los Angeles Inter-Urban Electric Railway (1904–1911) Pacific Electric (1911–1953) Metropolitan Coach Lines (1953–1958) Los Angeles Metropolitan Transit Authority (1958)
- Rolling stock: PE 1200 Class (last used)
- Ridership: 1,002,051 (1958)

History
- Opened: November 24, 1904 (to Wilmington)
- Completed: July 5, 1905
- Closed: December 7, 1958

Technical
- Line length: 25.39 mi (40.86 km)
- Number of tracks: 1–4
- Track gauge: 1,435 mm (4 ft 8 1/2 in) standard gauge
- Electrification: Overhead line, 600 V DC

San Pedro via Dominguez was a 25.39-mile (40.86 km) interurban transport route, part of the Pacific Electric system in Greater Los Angeles. Its termini were the Pacific Electric Building in Downtown Los Angeles and San Pedro in the south.

== History ==
Engineering studies began under Pacific Electric in 1902. Before construction started, the line was turned over to the Los Angeles Inter-Urban Electric Railway in January 1904, who built the line to Wilmington by November 24. Service to the long wharf began on May 21, 1905, with full service to San Pedro beginning on July 5. Traveling via the Dominguez route became the preferred way to reach San Pedro over the San Pedro via Gardena line (that line would be discontinued in 1940, several years before the Dominguez Line).

Pacific Electric again regained control of the service after the Great Merger of 1911. They replaced the low trestle to San Pablo with a drawbridge. During World War II, the drawbridge was bypassed as a defense measure; trains used the West Basin Line as a detour.

The line was transferred to Metropolitan Coach Lines in October 1953. A ship strike in 1955 necessitated removal of the drawbridge, and trains were rerouted back on the West Basin Line. In 1958, the service finally came under the operation of Los Angeles Metropolitan Transit Authority. The agency converted the route to bus service on December 7 of that year.

The right of way between Dominguez and Wilmington remains active for Union Pacific freight trains as the Dolores Industrial Lead, which was largely rebuilt as part of the Alameda Corridor.

== Route ==
From the 6th and Main Street station in Los Angeles to Dominguez Junction, the San Pedro via Dominguez followed the same Route as the Long Beach Line. From Dominguez Junction to San Pedro, the line was entirely in private right of way. At Dominguez Junction, the line branched southerly on dual tracks, immediately on the west of Alameda Street. The dual tracks ran south, crossing Del Arno Boulevard to reach Dominguez Street. Here, the Southern Pacific San Pedro Branch Line crossed over from the east side of Alameda Street to run on the west side of Alameda Street, thereby placing the Pacific Electric dual tracks immediately to the west of the Southern Pacific Line.

From Dominguez Street, the dual tracks on private way ran southerly, just west of the Southern Pacific Branch Line and parallel to Alameda Street, crossing Carson Street, and Sepulveda Boulevard to a point approximately one-half mile (0.8 km) farther south. At this location, the dual tracks veered away from the Southern Pacific Tracks (and Alameda Street) southwesterly toward Wilmington, crossing a Santa Fe Branch Line and Pacific Coast Highway to reach Flint Junction, where the Long Beach–San Pedro Line joined from the east.

From Flint Junction, the dual tracks continued southwesterly into Wilmington, crossing Anaheim Street, where the Catalina Dock Line branched off to the south. Next, the Wilmington station was reached at Avalon Boulevard and "B" Street, where the West Basin Line branched off to the west. From "B" Street the dual tracks continued south-westerly across the peninsula in Los Angeles Harbor known as "Pier A", paralleling Neptune Street on the west to the peninsula's southerly end. There the dual tracks reduced to a single track to cross the Southern Pacific Draw Bridge over the entrance to the West Basin.

Once across the drawbridge, the line expanded again to two tracks for the run into San Pedro on a long trestle. At 1st Street in San Pedro, the West Basin Line joined after completing its loop around the West Basin. The dual tracks continued southerly four blocks to the terminus of the line at the San Pedro Pacific Electric station on 5th Street. An electrified line continued further to Outer Harbor, but saw very little passenger service.

== List of major stations ==
Station	Mile	Major connections	Date opened	Date closed	City
Pacific Electric Building	0	Alhambra–San Gabriel, Annandale, Balboa, Fullerton, Hawthorne–El Segundo, La Habra–Yorba Linda, Long Beach, Monrovia–Glendora, Mount Lowe, Pasadena Short Line, Pasadena via Oak Knoll, Pomona, Redlands, Redondo Beach via Gardena, Riverside–Rialto, San Pedro via Gardena, Santa Ana, Santa Monica Air Line, Sierra Madre, Soldiers' Home, South Pasadena Local, Upland–San Bernardino, Whittier; Los Angeles Railway B, H, J, R, 7, and 8	1905	1961	Los Angeles
Slauson Junction	4.27	Balboa, Fullerton, Hawthorne–El Segundo, La Habra–Yorba Linda, Long Beach, Redondo Beach via Gardena, San Pedro via Gardena, Santa Ana, Whittier	1902	1961	Los Angeles
Watts	7.45	Balboa, Hawthorne–El Segundo, Long Beach, Redondo Beach via Gardena, San Pedro via Gardena, Santa Ana	1902	1961	Los Angeles
Compton	10.92	Long Beach, Balboa	1905	1961	Compton
Dominguez Junction	13.31	Long Beach, Balboa	1905	1961	Rancho Dominguez
Watson	17.19				
Wilmington Park	18.84			1961	Wilmington
Wilmington	20.06	Long Beach–San Pedro	1905	1961	Wilmington
San Pedro	22.68	Long Beach–San Pedro, San Pedro via Gardena, San Pedro Local Lines	1905	1961	San Pedro

== Partial restoration ==
The Waterfront Red Car was a partial restoration of the southern end of the route, intended to provide transportation in the San Pedro Harbor area. Replica and restored Red Cars ran a 1.5-mile (2.4 km) route from the World Cruise Centre cruise ship terminal under the Vincent Thomas Bridge to the intersection of 22nd Street and Miner Street. The operation ran primarily on weekends from 2003 to 2015, when service was "temporarily" suspended due to nearby road construction.
