= Alhambra–San Gabriel Line =

Former interurban rail line in California

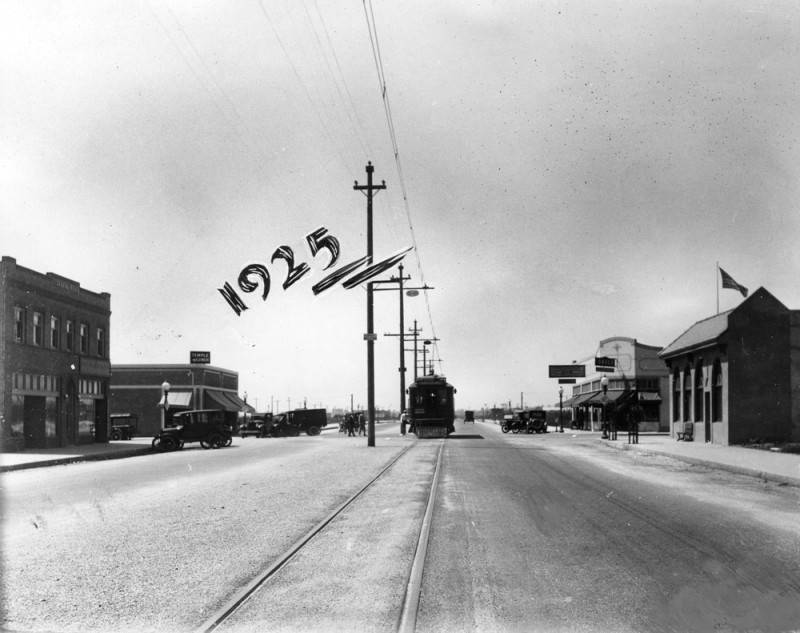
- Las Tunas Drive in Temple City, 1925

Overview
- Owner: Southern Pacific Railroad
- Locale: Los Angeles, San Gabriel Valley
- Termini: Pacific Electric Building; Temple City, California
- Stations: 18

Service
- Type: Interurban
- System: Pacific Electric
- Operator(s): Pacific Electric
- Rolling stock: 1300 class (last used)
- Ridership: 1,063,529 (1938)

History
- Opened: June 21, 1902
- Closed: November 30, 1941

Technical
- Line length: 14.67 mi (23.61 km)
- Number of tracks: 1–4
- Track gauge: 4 ft 8 1/2 in (1,435 mm) standard gauge
- Electrification: Overhead line, 600 V DC

The Alhambra–San Gabriel Line was a Pacific Electric interurban line which traveled between Los Angeles and Temple City.

== History ==
The line was built by the Los Angeles & Pasadena Electric Railway starting in October 1901; it was the first standard gauge interurban railway in Southern California. It opened on June 21, 1902 running between Los Angeles General Hospital and the San Gabriel Mission, soon extended to the Masonic Home. The service became a part of the Pacific Electric system by 1911, terminating at the Pacific Electric Building. Tracks were extended to Temple City on July 29, 1924. Passenger trips began utilizing the bypass in San Gabriel in 1928, with some cars skipping the Mission section and running straight through from Downtown to Temple City. The general operating pattern involved every other train alternately terminating at Temple City and San Gabriel Mission.

The last trips occurred on November 30, 1941. After passenger service ended, tracks were retained for freight until removed in 1951.

== Route ==
Between the 6th & Main Terminal and Sierra Vista Junction, the line followed the Northern District main line. At Sierra Vista Junction (where Huntington Drive and Main Street meet near the western border of Alhambra), the line diverged due east along the median of Main Street, continuing down Main through Alhambra (with the Shorb Line freight spur running south on Palm Avenue to the Southern Pacific's Alhambra depot on Mission Road), into San Gabriel (where Main Street becomes Las Tunas Drive) and finally into Temple City, where the line had an off-street terminal at the northeast corner of Las Tunas Drive and Kauffman Avenue. Additionally, there was a branch that turned south on Mission Drive in San Gabriel, passed along the southern edge of Mission San Gabriel Arcángel, then turned north on Junipero Serra Drive before rejoining the main line at Junipero Serra and Las Tunas drives.

== List of major stations ==
Station	Mile	Major connections	Date opened	Date closed	City
Temple City	14.67			1941	Temple City
East San Gabriel	12.07			1941	San Gabriel
San Gabriel		Southern Pacific Railroad	1901		San Gabriel
San Gabriel Mission	10.91				San Gabriel
Alhambra	9.45		1901	1941	Alhambra
Sierra Vista	7.39	Monrovia–Glendora, Mount Lowe, Pasadena Short Line, Pasadena via Oak Knoll, Shorb, Sierra Madre	1901	1951	Alhambra
Covina Junction	3.37	Monrovia–Glendora, Mount Lowe, Pasadena Short Line, Pasadena via Oak Knoll, Pomona, Riverside–Rialto, Sierra Madre, Upland–San Bernardino	1901	1951	Los Angeles
Echandia Junction		Annandale, Monrovia–Glendora, Mount Lowe, Pasadena Short Line, Pasadena via Oak Knoll, Pomona, Riverside–Rialto, Sierra Madre, South Pasadena Local, Upland–San Bernardino	1895	1951	Los Angeles
Pacific Electric Building	0	Annandale, Balboa, Fullerton, Hawthorne–El Segundo, La Habra–Yorba Linda, Long Beach, Monrovia–Glendora, Mount Lowe, Pasadena Short Line, Pasadena via Oak Knoll, Pomona, Riverside–Rialto, San Pedro via Dominguez, San Pedro via Gardena, Santa Ana, Santa Monica Air Line, Sierra Madre, Soldiers' Home, South Pasadena Local, Whittier; Los Angeles Railway B, H, J, R, 7, and 8	1905	1961	Los Angeles
