= Riverside–Rialto Line =

Train service

Riverside–Rialto
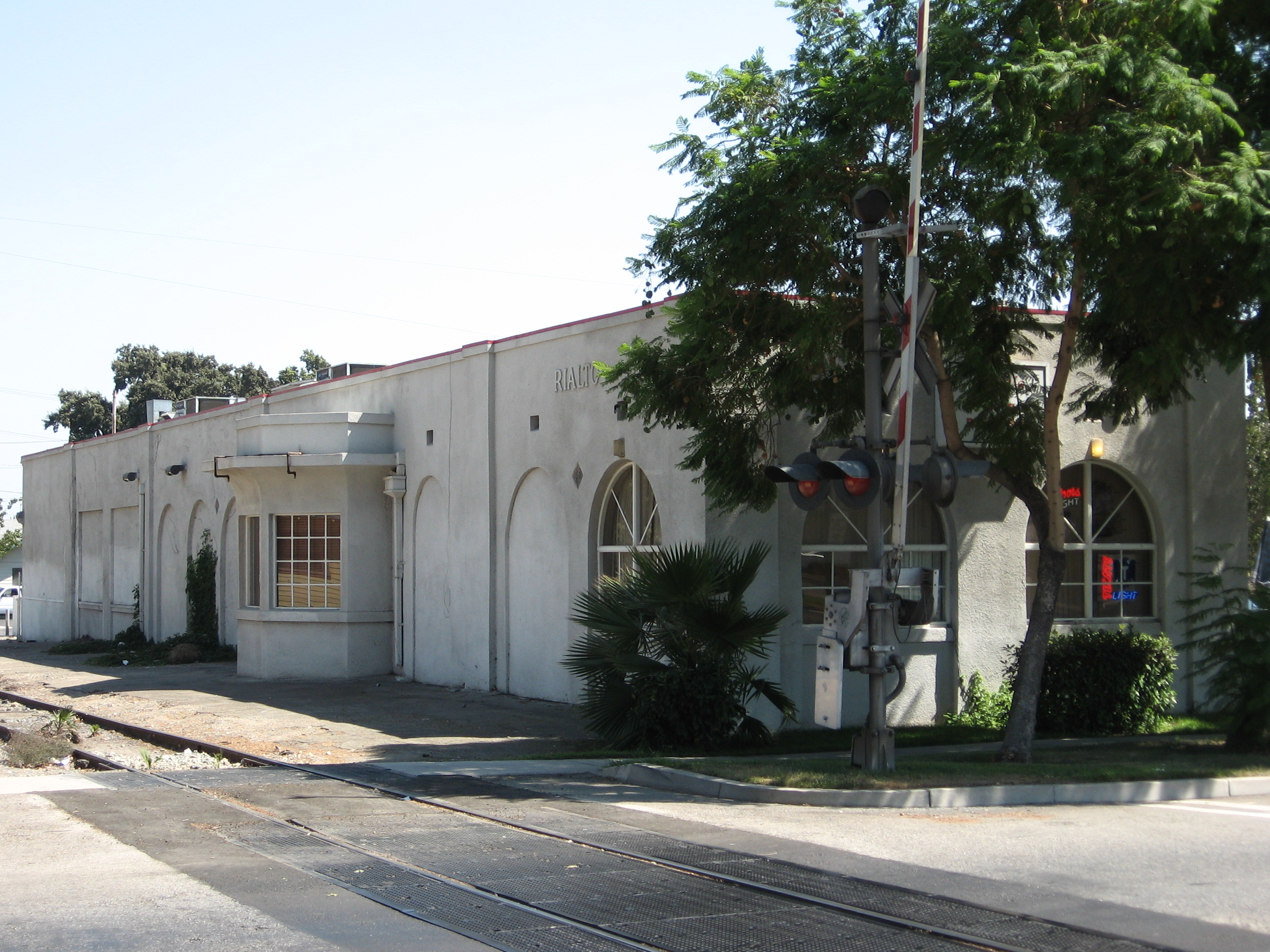
- The former Rialto Depot, seen in 2008. The ticket window is still intact, but unused.

Overview
- Owner: Union Pacific Railroad
- Locale: Los Angeles, San Gabriel Valley, Inland Empire
- Termini: Pacific Electric Building; Downtown Riverside
- Stations: 71

Service
- Type: Interurban
- System: Pacific Electric
- Operator: Pacific Electric
- Rolling stock: 1300 class (last used)

History
- Opened: May 1, 1908
- Closed: November 18, 1940

Technical
- Track gauge: 1,435 mm (4 ft 8 1/2 in) standard gauge
- Electrification: 600 V / 1200 V DC Overhead lines

Riverside–Rialto was an interurban train service operated by the Pacific Electric Railway from 1914 to 1940, running from Downtown Los Angeles to Downtown Riverside. This was the longest service in the Pacific Electric system, and the only line to have exclusive trackage owned by the Union Pacific instead of the Southern Pacific Railroad. The line reached its highest ridership the year it opened but never recovered at a time when the Inland Empire was far less populated and a commute of that distance was rare.

== History ==
The line was initially constructed in 1907 by the Riverside Portland Cement Company to link their new plant to the national rail network at Riverside. Operating as The Crescent City Railway Company, service was contracted out to The Riverside & Arlington Railway Company who began regular operations on May 18, 1908. The line primarily served plant workers. Riverside & Arlington would go on to be absorbed into Pacific Electric as a result of the Great Merger. The line was opened to Bloomington on March 11, 1911, and finally to Rialto on March 25, 1914. Initially only local service was provided, and passengers from Los Angeles continuing to Riverside were encouraged to take the longer trip and change at San Bernardino.

On March 15, 1915, most local service was replaced with through trips to the Pacific Electric Building in Downtown Los Angeles. Cars were connected to San Bernardino Line trains. Between May 1921 and 1929, local cars made trips as far north as Foothill Boulevard in Rialto — the only scheduled trips to that point. All trips became through-routed to Los Angeles on November 2, 1931 as service to the cement plant was discontinued. This was short lived, as by 1935 all but one trip had been reverted to local with through routing ending entirely in 1938. Service was reduced to a single trip between Riverside and Rialto by June 9, 1940 and discontinued outright on November 18.

San Bernardino County acquired the right of way between Merrill Avenue and Colton Avenue in 1942 for a cost of $200 (Note: equivalent to $3,941 in 2025 adjusted for inflation) — this was used to widen the adjacent roadway.

== List of major stations ==
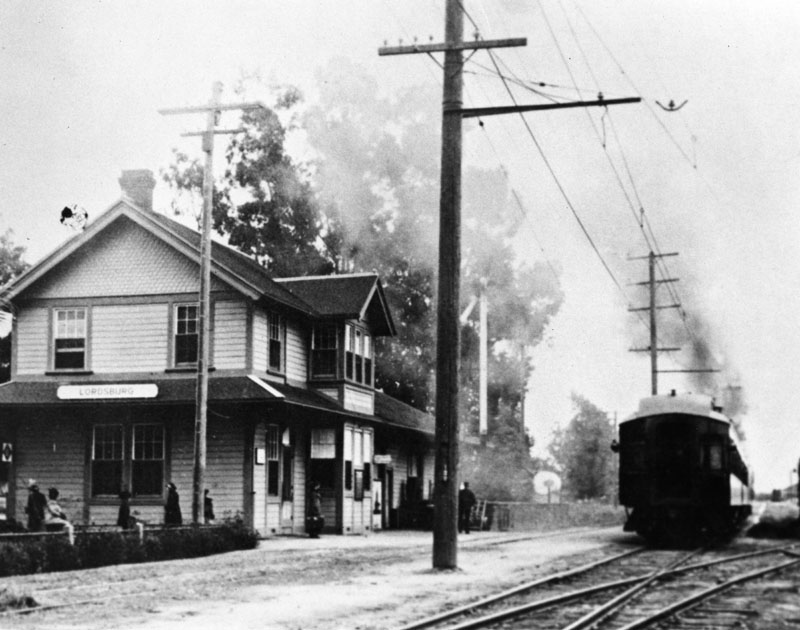
Lordsburg station (later La Verne), 1922

Station	Major connections	Service began	Date discontinued	City
Riverside	Arlington–Corona, San Bernardino–Riverside	1908	1940	Riverside
Rialto	Upland–San Bernardino	1914	1940	Rialto
Upland	Upland–San Bernardino	1915	1940	Upland
Claremont	Pomona–Claremont, Upland–San Bernardino	1915	1940	Claremont
San Dimas	Pomona, Upland–San Bernardino	1915	1940	San Dimas
Covina	Pomona, Upland–San Bernardino	1915	1940	Covina
El Monte	Pomona, Upland–San Bernardino	1915	1940	El Monte
Covina Junction	Alhambra–San Gabriel, Monrovia–Glendora, Mount Lowe, Pasadena Short Line, Pasadena via Oak Knoll, Pomona, Sierra Madre, Upland–San Bernardino	1915	1940	Los Angeles
Echandia Junction	Alhambra–San Gabriel, Annandale, Monrovia–Glendora, Mount Lowe, Pasadena Short Line, Pasadena via Oak Knoll, Pomona, Sierra Madre, South Pasadena Local, Upland–San Bernardino	1915	1940	Los Angeles
Pacific Electric Building	Alhambra–San Gabriel, Annandale, Balboa, Fullerton, Hawthorne–El Segundo, La Habra–Yorba Linda, Long Beach, Monrovia–Glendora, Mount Lowe, Pasadena Short Line, Pasadena via Oak Knoll, Pomona, San Pedro via Dominguez, San Pedro via Gardena, Santa Ana, Santa Monica Air Line, Sierra Madre, Soldiers' Home, South Pasadena Local, Upland–San Bernardino, Whittier; Los Angeles Railway B, H, J, R, 7, and 8	1915	1940	Los Angeles
