= Monrovia–Glendora Line =

Pacific Electric streetcar route (1902–1951)

Monrovia–Glendora
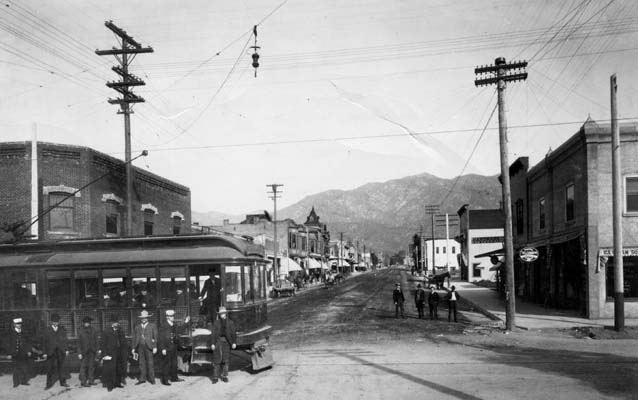
- Myrtle Avenue in Monrovia, 1903

Overview
- Owner: Pacific Electric
- Locale: Southern California
- Termini: 6th & Main Terminal; Glendora
- Stations: 39

Service
- Type: Interurban
- System: Pacific Electric
- Operator(s): Pacific Electric
- Rolling stock: varied

History
- Opened: 1902
- Closed: September 30, 1951

Technical
- Line length: 26.21 mi (42.18 km)
- Number of tracks: varied
- Track gauge: 1,435 mm (4 ft 8 1/2 in) standard gauge
- Electrification: Overhead line, 600 V DC

The Monrovia–Glendora Line was a route on the Pacific Electric Railway serving the San Gabriel Valley. It operated from 1902 to 1951, supporting nearby real estate development.

== History ==
The route was established in 1902. Passenger service at Monrovia began on March 1, 1903. The extension to Glendora followed in December 1907.

The Los Angeles terminal was moved to the elevated viaduct at Main Street Station after February 11, 1917. A proposed four-mile (6.4 km) extension of the line from Glendora to Lone Hill was denied by the Railroad Commission of the State of California in March 1918, citing wartime conditions.

Special runs to Santa Anita Race Track were offered during race days beginning in 1934. Cars were rerouted over the new Aliso Street Bridge on July 18, 1943. The last cars ran over the line in the early hours of September 30, 1951 — the final passenger run to operate over PE's Northern District.

== Route ==
From the 6th and Main Terminal in Downtown Los Angeles, the Monrovia–Glendora Line ran on the Upland–San Bernardino Line to "Valley Junction" (near Marengo Street, west of Soto Street) where the San Bernardino Line continued east. From there, the dual tracks continued on private way, in a northeasterly direction, paralleling Soto Street on the west, crossing over Valley Boulevard and the Southern Pacific Railroad Mainline on a steel bridge and continuing northerly to reach Indian Village (in the vicinity of Soto Street and Multnomah Street). Here, a four track system began. A mile or so further north, the four tracks crossed over Mission Road on a concrete and steel viaduct, and then continued northwesterly on private way between the dual roadways of Huntington Drive.

At Sierra Vista (Main Street and Huntington Drive) the Alhambra–San Gabriel Line branched easterly from the four track section and proceeded on Main Street, while the Monrovia–Glendora Line continued north and then east still between dual roadways on Huntington Drive, to Oneonta Park (Huntington Drive and Fair Oaks Avenue). Here, the Pasadena Short Line turned north on Fair Oaks Avenue. The line then continued on a four track system, crossing the Southern Pacific's Pasadena Branch at Marengo Avenue, as far as "El Molino" (Granada Avenue) where the system returned to dual trackage. It continued northeasterly still between the dual roadways of Huntington Drive, passed Oak Knoll Avenue, (where the Oak Knoll Line proceeded north into Pasadena), and in a mile or so passed what is now known as Sierra Madre Boulevard (where the local Sierra Madre Line turned north) in San Marino.

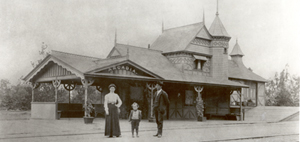
Arcadia train station serviced by the Santa Fe Railway – the Monrovia–Glendora Line stopped adjacent to the depot

Proceeding east, the Monrovia–Glendora Line passed southerly of Santa Anita Racetrack and continued northeasterly on private way to St. Joseph Street in Arcadia. The line ran in the pavement of St. Joseph Street from Santa Anita across the Atchison, Topeka and Santa Fe Railway Mainline to 2nd Avenue. The Arcadia train station was the route's San Gabriel Valley transfer point for ATSF passenger trains. It then went on private way as far as Olive Avenue at Mayflower Avenue in Monrovia. The line then continued in the pavement of Olive Avenue as far as Shamrock Avenue. From Shamrock Avenue, the dual tracks on private way, followed along Olive Avenue and Royal Oaks Avenue to Las Lomas Road where they then traversed open land to the San Gabriel River. The line crossed the river on a double-track concrete arch viaduct, which was reduced to single-track following a 1938 flood. The line then continued across open land into Azusa and entered city streets at 9th Street and Angeleno Avenue. The dual tracks reduced to single track on private way at 9th Street and Pasadena Avenue. Thereafter, the line proceeded east, north of Foothill Boulevard on private way to its terminus in Glendora at Michigan Avenue (now named Glendora Avenue).

=== Stations ===
Station	Mile	Major connections	Date opened	Date closed	City
Glendora	26.21		1907	1951	Glendora
Azusa	23.40			1951	Azusa
Duarte	21.47			1951	Duarte
Monrovia	17.99		1903	1951	Monrovia
Arcadia	16.30	Atchison, Topeka and Santa Fe Railway		1951	Arcadia
San Marino	11.39			1951	San Marino
El Molino	10.11	Pasadena via Oak Knoll, Sierra Madre	1902	1951	San Marino
Oneonta Park	8.56	Pasadena via Oak Knoll, Mount Lowe, Pasadena Short Line, Shorb, Sierra Madre	1901	1951	South Pasadena
Sierra Vista	7.65	Alhambra–San Gabriel, Pasadena via Oak Knoll, Mount Lowe, Pasadena Short Line, Shorb, Sierra Madre	1901	1951	Alhambra
Covina Junction	3.37	Alhambra–San Gabriel, Pasadena via Oak Knoll, Mount Lowe, Pasadena Short Line, Pomona, Riverside–Rialto, Sierra Madre, Upland–San Bernardino	1901	1951	Los Angeles
Echandia Junction		Alhambra–San Gabriel, Annandale, Pasadena via Oak Knoll, Mount Lowe, Pasadena Short Line, Pomona, Riverside–Rialto, Sierra Madre, South Pasadena Local, Upland–San Bernardino	1895	1951	Los Angeles
Pacific Electric Building	0	Alhambra–San Gabriel, Annandale, Balboa, Fullerton, Hawthorne–El Segundo, La Habra–Yorba Linda, Long Beach, Pasadena via Oak Knoll, Mount Lowe, Pasadena Short Line, Pomona, Riverside–Rialto, San Pedro via Dominguez, San Pedro via Gardena, Santa Ana, Santa Monica Air Line, Sierra Madre, Soldiers' Home, South Pasadena Local, Whittier; Los Angeles Railway B, H, J, R, 7, and 8	1905	1961	Los Angeles
