= Pasadena via Oak Knoll Line =

Pacific Electric streetcar line (1906–1950)

Pasadena via Oak Knoll
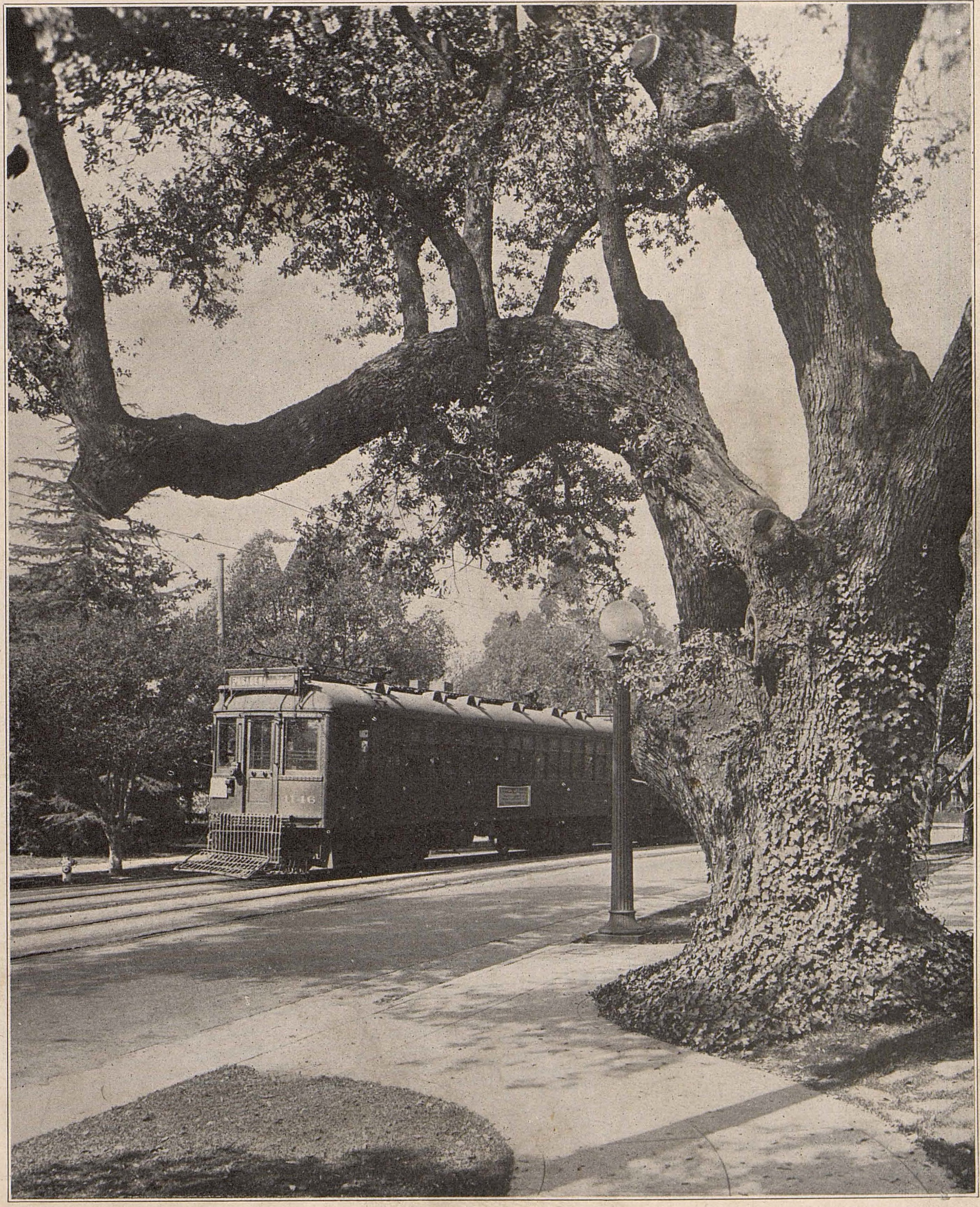

Overview
- Owner: Southern Pacific Railroad
- Line number: 1
- Locale: Southern California
- Termini: Pacific Electric Building; Downtown Pasadena
- Stations: 19

Service
- Type: Interurban
- System: Pacific Electric
- Operator(s): Pacific Electric
- Rolling stock: PE 1100 Class (last used)
- Daily ridership: 7,693 (last counting)

History
- Opened: 1906
- Closed: December 28, 1950

Technical
- Line length: 13.8 mi (22.2 km)
- Track gauge: 1,435 mm (4 ft 8 1/2 in) standard gauge
- Electrification: Overhead line, 600 V DC

The Pasadena via Oak Knoll Line was a United States interurban route of the Pacific Electric Railway. It operated from 1906 until 1950, between Downtown Los Angeles and Downtown Pasadena, California. Cars ran as far as Altadena during rush hours.

== History ==
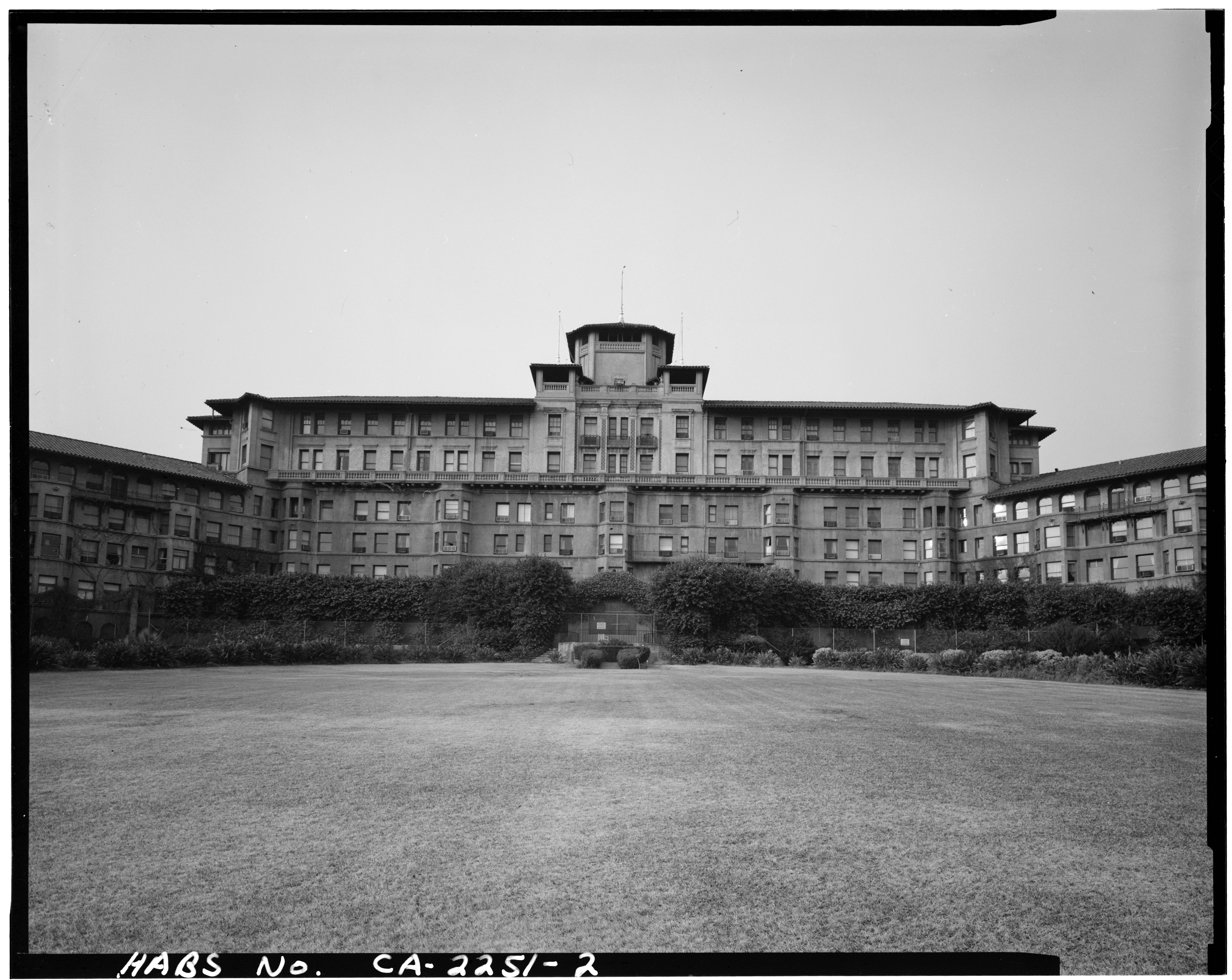
The Wentworth Hotel, later the Huntington Hotel

The route was originally built in 1906 to reach the Wentworth Hotel (later Huntington Hotel) in Oak Knoll from El Molino and was thusly known as the Wentworth Line, a designation it retained for some time. It tied into the Monrovia–Glendora Line. The routing through Pasadena was changed in 1913 to Lake Avenue, Colorado Street, Raymond Avenue, and through the car house on Fair Oaks Avenue. A further rerouting in downtown Los Angeles occurred on December 3, 1916. The outbound terminus was changed for all trips to Altadena between October 1928 and May 1929. The routing was reverted after that, but rear cars of a few rush hour trains continued until January 18, 1941.

Congestion at the Pacific Electric Building during World War II forced Oak Knoll Line trains to utilize a loop route around Downtown instead of running directly to the terminal building starting in July 1943. Trains would continue to run to the Main Street Terminal every New Years Day to serve passengers traveling to the Tournament of Roses Parade. The loop line was discontinued on October 5, 1947.

Service was largely discontinued after October 8, 1950 with a single round trip operating between Pasadena and El Molino to maintain the franchise. This ended after December 28. It was the second to last Pacific Electric line to be decommissioned in Pasadena, and was the last line to run along Colorado Boulevard.

By 1981, the tracks along the entirety of the route had been removed.

== Route ==
The line followed the Monrovia–Glendora Line to the end of the quadruple-track system at El Molino Junction. From that point (at Huntington Drive between Oak Knoll Avenue and Chelsea Road), two tracks turned north on private right of way, crossing Monterey Road and Old Mill Road before turning west toward the Huntington Hotel. At this point, the line proceeded north in the pavement of city streets, running on Oak Knoll Avenue (with a short section of private right of way between Canon Drive and Arden Road that passed to the north of Oak Knoll Circle's meandering curves) and South Lake Avenue as far as Colorado Street. It then turned west and ran on Colorado Street through the Pasadena business district to Fair Oaks Avenue. Here, the line turned north and ran on Fair Oaks Avenue several blocks to the terminus of the route at the North Fair Oaks Carhouse.

=== List of major stations ===
Station	Mile	Major connections	Date opened	Date closed	City
Pasadena	13.88	East California, East Orange Grove, East Washington, Lamanda Park, Lincoln, Mount Lowe, North Fair Oaks, North Lake, Pasadena Short Line, West California, West Colorado and Orange Grove	1902	1950	Pasadena
El Molino	10.11	Monrovia–Glendora, Sierra Madre	1902	1950	San Marino
Oneonta Park	8.56	Monrovia–Glendora, Mount Lowe, Pasadena Short Line, Shorb, Sierra Madre	1901	1951	South Pasadena
Sierra Vista	7.65	Alhambra–San Gabriel, Monrovia–Glendora, Mount Lowe, Pasadena Short Line, Shorb, Sierra Madre	1901	1951	Alhambra
Covina Junction		Alhambra–San Gabriel, Monrovia–Glendora, Mount Lowe, Pasadena Short Line, Pomona, Riverside–Rialto, Sierra Madre, Upland–San Bernardino	1901	1951	Los Angeles
Echandia Junction		Alhambra–San Gabriel, Annandale, Monrovia–Glendora, Mount Lowe, Pasadena Short Line, Pomona, Riverside–Rialto, Sierra Madre, South Pasadena Local, Upland–San Bernardino	1895	1951	Los Angeles
Pacific Electric Building	0	Alhambra–San Gabriel, Annandale, Balboa, Fullerton, Hawthorne–El Segundo, La Habra–Yorba Linda, Long Beach, Monrovia–Glendora, Mount Lowe, Pasadena Short Line, Pomona, Riverside–Rialto, San Pedro via Dominguez, San Pedro via Gardena, Santa Ana, Santa Monica Air Line, Sierra Madre, Soldiers' Home, South Pasadena Local, Whittier; Los Angeles Railway B, H, J, R, 7, and 8	1905	1961	Los Angeles
