= South Pasadena Local =

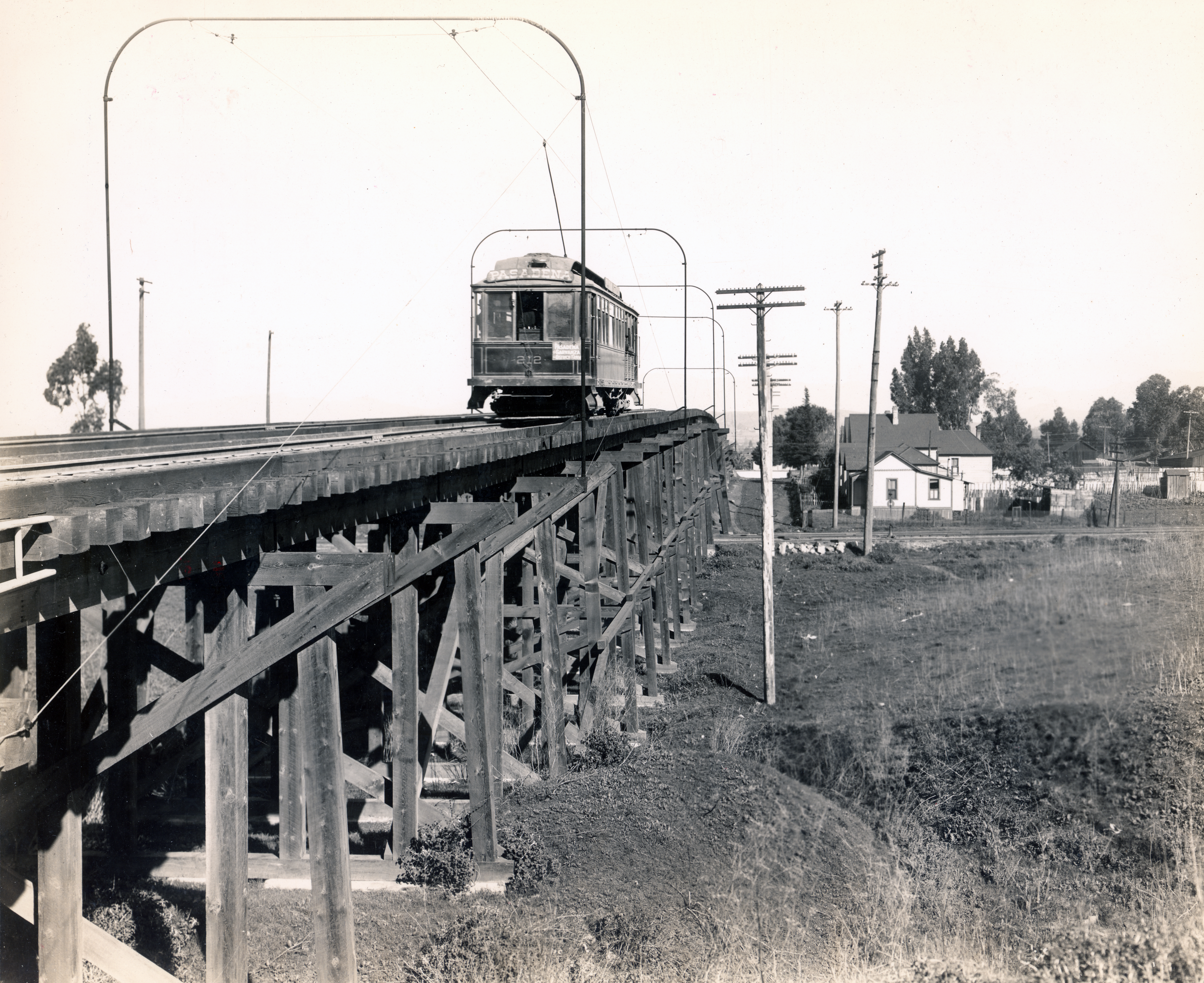
- Pacific Electric passenger rail car no.212 passes over the Daly Street Bridge, c. 1906

Overview
- Owner: Southern Pacific Railroad
- Locale: Southern California
- Termini: Pacific Electric Building; South Pasadena
- Stations: 7

Service
- Type: Light rail
- System: Pacific Electric
- Operator(s): Pacific Electric
- Rolling stock: 600 Class (1928–1938); Birney 300 Class (1938–1942)

History
- Opened: May 7, 1895
- Closed: October 17, 1942

Technical
- Track gauge: 1,435 mm (4 ft 8 1/2 in) standard gauge
- Old gauge: 3 ft 6 in (1,067 mm)
- Electrification: Overhead line, 600 V DC

South Pasadena Local was a local streetcar line operated by the Pacific Electric Railway between Downtown Los Angeles and South Pasadena, California by way of the Arroyo Seco Route. This was one of four lines that connected the two cities.

== Route ==
The South Pasadena Line originated at the Pacific Electric Building in downtown Los Angeles. The double-track railway exited the station on to Main Street and ran in the pavement of city streets: north on Main Street, east on 1st Street, north on Los Angeles Street and east on Aliso Street to the Los Angeles River. The line crossed the river and Mission Road on the Aliso Street Viaduct and ran east in a private right of way (that by 1981 had been obliterated by construction of the San Bernardino Freeway) to Echandia Junction. It then turned north, crossing Mission Road and over the Southern Pacific Railroad Mainline. It then turned east and proceeded in a private right of way along the route of the Golden State Freeway to Daly Street, where the line returned to street running. It then continued north on Daly Street and Pasadena Avenue and then ran northeast on Figueroa Street (as far as York Boulevard on private way, presently York Boulevard and Pasadena Avenue) It crossed the Arroyo Seco on the Garvanza Viaduct and then proceeded to Mission Street. The line continued east in the pavement of Mission Street to reach its terminus at Fair Oaks Avenue.

== History ==
This line was opened on May 7, 1895 by the Pasadena and Los Angeles Railway with narrow gauge rails. The line was rebuilt as standard gauge in 1903 after it was acquired by Pacific Electric the previous year, though construction of the Pasadena Short Line relegated the South Pasadena Local to a secondary status. Supplemental service on the north end of the line was provided by the Mission and Fair Oaks Avenue Local Line until 1911. Cars were through-routed with the Watts Line from 1912 to 1923. Service was converted to one-man operation starting in 1931. Routing with the Watts Line began once again in 1932, and the segment of the line between General Hospital and South Pasadena was abandoned at the start of 1935 with cars still running as far at Watts. Through-routing was reduced to shuttle service between the Hospital and Echandia in 1938, covering a distance of about 1,000 feet (300 m) (the shortest service offered by the railroad, though operating in an exclusive right of way). A base headway service was largely maintained until October 17, 1942 when the shuttle was discontinued.

== List of major stations ==
Station	Major connections	Date opened	Date closed	City
South Pasadena	Mount Lowe, Pasadena Short Line	1902	1951	South Pasadena
Echandia Junction	Alhambra–San Gabriel, Annandale, Monrovia–Glendora, Mount Lowe, Pasadena Short Line, Pasadena via Oak Knoll, Pomona, Riverside-Rialto, Sierra Madre, Upland–San Bernardino	1895	1951	Los Angeles
Pacific Electric Building	Alhambra–San Gabriel, Annandale, Balboa, Fullerton, Hawthorne-El Segundo, La Habra–Fullerton–Yorba Linda, Long Beach, Monrovia–Glendora, Mount Lowe, Pasadena Short Line, Pasadena via Oak Knoll, Pomona, Riverside–Rialto, San Pedro via Dominguez, San Pedro via Gardena, Santa Ana, Santa Monica Air Line, Sierra Madre, Soldiers' Home, Whittier	1905	1961	Los Angeles

== Rolling stock ==
Hollywood Cars began operations over the line in 1928. Shuttle operations in 1938 were handled by a single Birney 300 Class.
