= Pasadena Short Line =

Pacific Electric streetcar line (1894–1951)

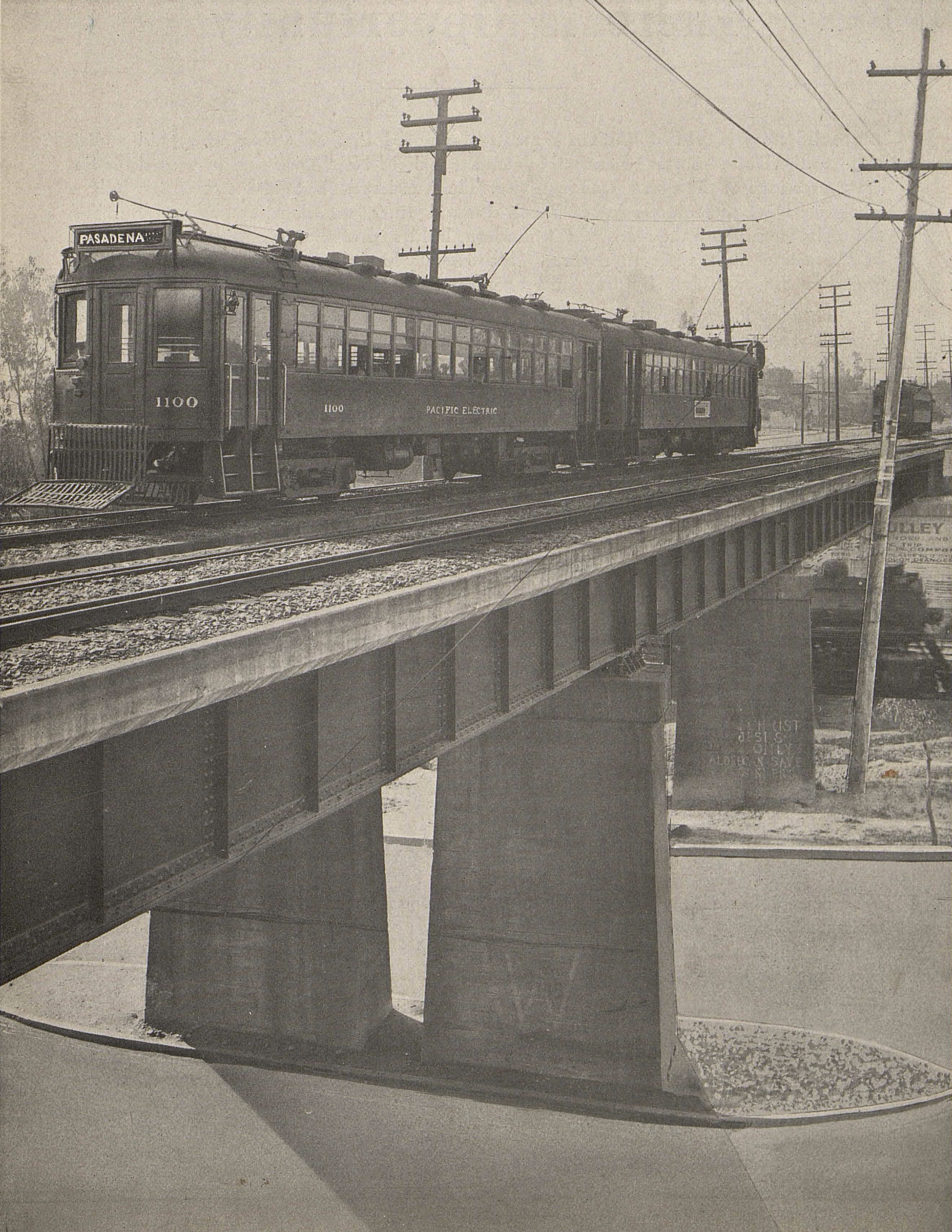

Overview
- Owner: Southern Pacific Railroad
- Locale: Southern California
- Termini: Pacific Electric Building; Downtown Pasadena
- Stations: 14

Service
- Type: Light rail
- System: Pacific Electric
- Operator: Pacific Electric
- Rolling stock: PE 5050 Class (last used)
- Daily ridership: 7,693 (last counting)

History
- Opened: 1894 (Pasadena & Los Angeles Electric Railway); 1902 (Pacific Electric)
- Closed: September 30, 1951

Technical
- Line length: 11.6 mi (18.7 km)
- Track gauge: 1,435 mm (4 ft 8 1/2 in) standard gauge
- Old gauge: narrow gauge
- Electrification: Overhead line, 600 V DC

The Pasadena Short Line was a passenger railway line of the Pacific Electric Railway. It ran between Downtown Los Angeles and Downtown Pasadena, California, through Eastside Los Angeles along the foot of the eastern San Rafael Hills to the western San Gabriel Valley. It was in service under the company between 1902 until 1951, though it had operated under different companies back to its beginnings as a horsecar line. The route, designated by the company as line 2, was the key component of the company's Northern Subdivision.

== History ==
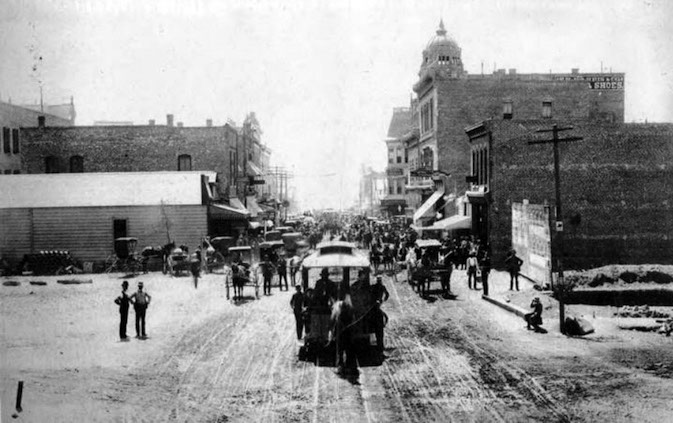
Fair Oaks Avenue in Pasadena looking south from Colorado Boulevard, horsecar approaching at center frame, c. 1889.

The route began as a horsecar line. In 1894, the Pasadena & Los Angeles Electric Railway purchased, re-gauged, electrified, and double-tracked a section of the line for streetcar use. Service began on May 6, 1895. Pacific Electric acquired the route in 1898. The line was again rebuilt to standard gauge with service between Pasadena and Los Angeles beginning in December 1902. Negotiations to cross the existing roads — the Santa Fe Railway, Terminal Railway, and California Cycleway — led Pacific Electric to build a bridge over the right of ways shortly after their service commenced. In 1908, double tracking was completed throughout.

Peak service frequency was likely reached around 1917 or 1918, with 90 trains operating daily in each direction. Two years later, Pacific Electric had cut that number to 59. Starting November 1926, some morning rush hour trains originated at Mariposa and Lake in Altadena. Service reductions continued throughout the late 1920s and 1930s. A complimenting outbound trip to Altadena began in 1938. Minor reroutes near the line's terminals occurred in 1940 and a reroute to accommodate the rebuild of the Aliso Street bridge also began that year, lasting until 1943.

The Altadena runs ended in January 1941. The line was rerouted to no longer serve the Pacific Electric Building in 1942 as buses had begun operating from the street-level concourse there. Cars thereafter loop around via San Pedro, Sixth, Main, First, and Los Angeles except on New Years Day to serve the Tournament of Roses until 1947 when they began serving the elevated concourse. One-man operation of cars began on October 22, 1950. The last trains ran over the line in the early morning of September 30, 1951, at the end of service from the previous day. A railfan excursion run after normal service that day became the last trip via electric railway between Los Angeles and Pasadena until the construction of the Los Angeles County Metropolitan Transportation Authority Gold Line in the early 2000s. Service was promptly replaced by buses.

Caltrans noted that all tracks had been removed along the route by 1981.

== Route ==
The Pasadena Short Line followed the Monrovia–Glendora Line (Huntington Drive) to Fair Oaks Avenue in South Pasadena (Oneonta Junction). Here, the line branched north along double tracks in the pavement of Fair Oaks Avenue to California Boulevard. It then ran east one block on California Boulevard to Raymond Avenue and then north in the pavement of Raymond Avenue, past Colorado Street several blocks to the North Fair Oaks Carhouse (Located between Raymond and Fair Oaks Avenues). It then exited out the west side of the Carhouse on to Fair Oaks Avenue for its return trip. The Raymond Avenue track was abandoned in 1940 and Fair Oaks Avenue was used in both directions thereafter.

== List of major stations ==
Station	Mile	Major connections	Date opened	Date closed	City
Pasadena	11.64	East California, East Orange Grove, East Washington, Lamanda Park, Lincoln, Mount Lowe, North Fair Oaks, North Lake, Pasadena via Oak Knoll, South Pasadena Local, West California, West Colorado and Orange Grove	1902	1951	Pasadena
South Pasadena		Mount Lowe Railway, South Pasadena Local	1902	1951	South Pasadena
Oneonta Park	8.56	Monrovia–Glendora, Mount Lowe, Pasadena via Oak Knoll, Shorb, Sierra Madre	1901	1951	South Pasadena
Sierra Vista	7.65	Alhambra–San Gabriel, Monrovia–Glendora, Mount Lowe, Pasadena via Oak Knoll, Shorb, Sierra Madre	1901	1951	Alhambra
Covina Junction	3.37	Alhambra–San Gabriel, Monrovia–Glendora, Mount Lowe, Pasadena via Oak Knoll, Pomona, Riverside–Rialto, Sierra Madre, Upland–San Bernardino	1901	1951	Los Angeles
Echandia Junction		Alhambra–San Gabriel, Annandale, Monrovia–Glendora, Mount Lowe, Pasadena via Oak Knoll, Pomona, Riverside–Rialto, Sierra Madre, South Pasadena Local, Upland–San Bernardino	1895		Los Angeles
Pacific Electric Building	0	Alhambra–San Gabriel, Annandale, Balboa, Fullerton, Hawthorne–El Segundo, La Habra–Yorba Linda, Long Beach, Monrovia–Glendora, Mount Lowe, Pasadena via Oak Knoll, Pomona, Riverside–Rialto, San Pedro via Dominguez, San Pedro via Gardena, Santa Ana, Santa Monica Air Line, Sierra Madre, Soldiers' Home, South Pasadena Local, Whittier; Los Angeles Railway B, H, J, R, 7, and 8	1905	1961	Los Angeles

== Southern Pacific depot service ==
Starting on May 1, 1912, some trips along the line began originating at the Los Angeles Southern Pacific station or the Pasadena Southern Pacific station. This allowed Southern Pacific to discontinue passenger service along their Pasadena Branch. The Pasadena SP station was closed in 1927, thus the terminus was moved to the Pacific Electric Depot on Raymond Avenue. By August 11, 1932, frequency had been reduced to a single daily franchise car and the service was entirely eliminated on July 30 the following year.
