= Sierra Madre Line =

Sierra Madre
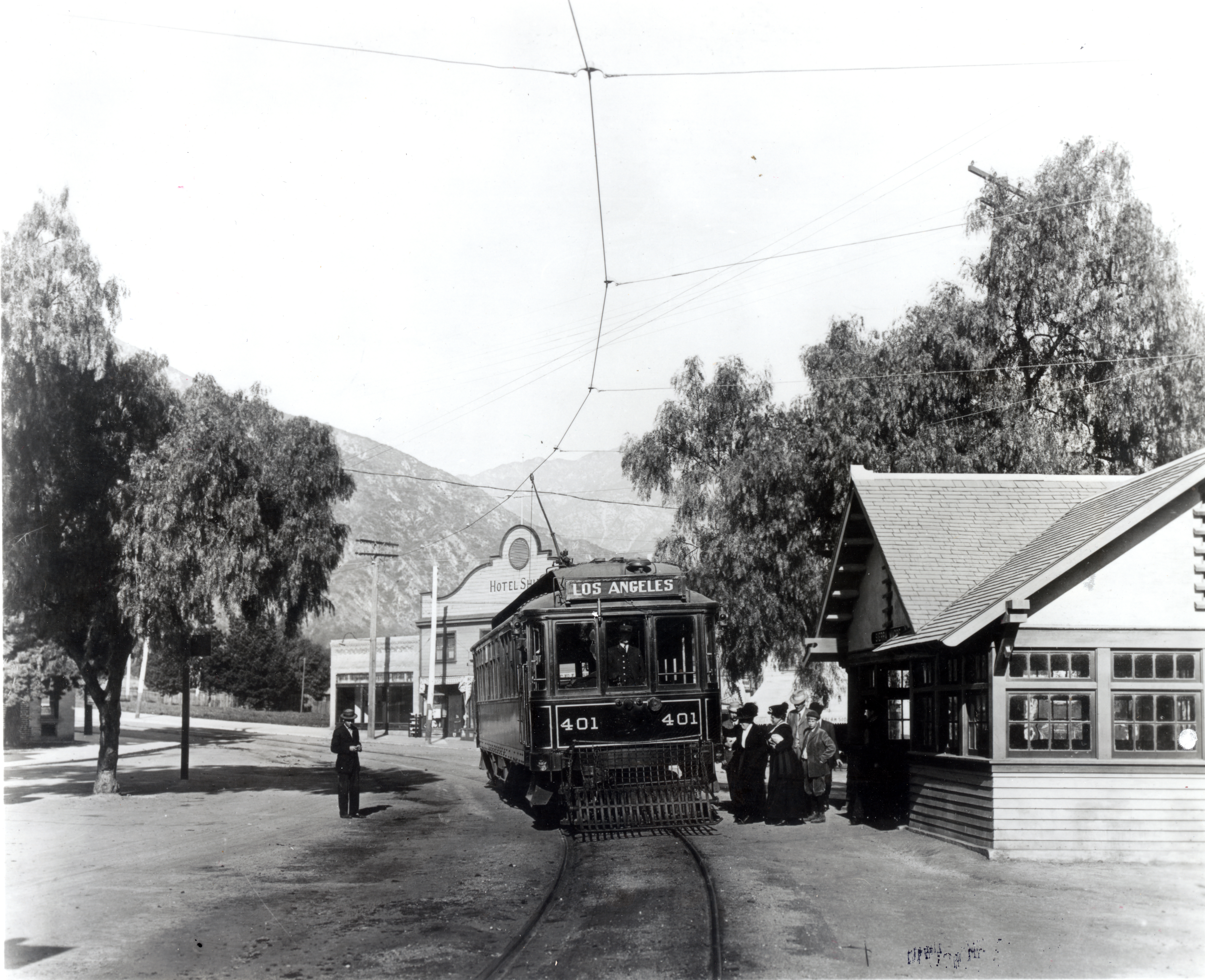
- Sierra Madre 1908 with PE line Depot and the Hotel Shirley in background

Overview
- Owner: Southern Pacific Railroad
- Locale: Southern California
- Termini: Pacific Electric Building; Sierra Madre, California
- Stations: 24

Service
- Type: Interurban
- System: Pacific Electric
- Operator(s): Pacific Electric
- Rolling stock: PE 1100 Class (last used)
- Daily ridership: 1713 (last counted)

History
- Opened: January 1, 1906
- Closed: December 28, 1950

Technical
- Line length: 16.52 mi (26.59 km)
- Track gauge: 1,435 mm (4 ft 8 1/2 in) standard gauge
- Electrification: Overhead line, 600 V DC

The Sierra Madre Line was a Pacific Electric interurban route which ran 16.52 miles (26.59 km) from the Pacific Electric Building in Los Angeles to Sierra Madre.

== History ==
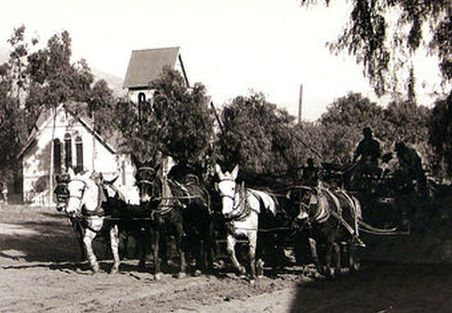
Central Avenue, Sierra Madre in 1904. A mule team is grading the avenue for the installation of the 1905 Pacific Electric street car, in the background is the Old North Church with the original barn roof bell tower.

The line opened to Pasadena on March 1, 1904. Cars were run through on the Lamanda Park Line to Pasadena. The extension to Sierra Madre opened on New Year's Day 1906. On December 3, 1916 the routing through Downtown Los Angeles changed.

Shuttle service for evening trips between Sierra Madre and San Marino began by March 1, 1928 with passengers changing to Monrovia–Glendora Line trains to complete the trip. Starting March 1939 the rear car of some Glendora trains were disconnected to continue to Sierra Madre. This arrangement became the line's only direct Los Angeles service starting February 21, 1943, as all midday service became shuttles and only rush hour cars from Monrovia trains served the line.

Weekend and midday service was discontinued on June 11, 1948 and all trips became shuttles. A single morning outbound trip from Los Angeles was added after November 25, 1949. On October 8, 1950 service was virtually abandoned with a single daily round trip running between Sierra Madre and San Marino; this ended on December 28, 1950. Pacific Electric continued to operate the route with motor coaches after abandonment.

== Route ==
The Sierra Madre Line branched north from the Monrovia–Glendora Line in San Marino and its two tracks ran between the dual roadways of Sierra Madre Boulevard passing Lamanda Park Junction (Colorado Street and Sierra Madre Boulevard) where it met the local East Colorado Street Line. From this point, the line continued on single track in a northerly direction along a private right of way in the center of Sierra Madre Boulevard to Michillinda Avenue. There the tracks entered into the pavement of city streets and proceeded on Central Avenue (Sierra Madre Boulevard) to Baldwin Avenue in Sierra Madre, where the station was located on the northwest corner at what's now Kersting Park. It then continued north one and one-half blocks via Baldwin Avenue and turned easterly onto another private right of way (between Montecito Avenue and Highland Avenue) to the end of the line of Mountain Trail Avenue, where a small storage yard was located.

== List of major stations ==
Station	Mile	Major connections	Date opened	Date closed	City
Sierra Madre	16.52		1902	1950	Sierra Madre
El Rincon	14.10				
Lamanda Park Junction	12.96	Lamanda Park	1902	1950	Pasadena
San Marino	11.13	Monrovia–Glendora	1902	1950	San Marino
El Molino	9.85	Monrovia–Glendora, Pasadena via Oak Knoll	1902	1950	San Marino
Oneonta Park	8.30	Monrovia–Glendora, Mount Lowe, Pasadena Short Line, Pasadena via Oak Knoll, Shorb	1901	1951	South Pasadena
Sierra Vista	7.39	Alhambra–San Gabriel, Monrovia–Glendora, Mount Lowe, Pasadena Short Line, Pasadena via Oak Knoll, Shorb	1901	1951	Alhambra
Covina Junction	3.11	Alhambra–San Gabriel, Monrovia–Glendora, Mount Lowe, Pasadena Short Line, Pasadena via Oak Knoll, Pomona, Riverside–Rialto, Upland–San Bernardino	1901	1951	Los Angeles
Echandia Junction		Alhambra–San Gabriel, Annandale, Monrovia–Glendora, Mount Lowe, Pasadena Short Line, Pasadena via Oak Knoll, Pomona, Riverside–Rialto, South Pasadena Local, Upland–San Bernardino	1895	1951	Los Angeles
Aliso and San Pedro	1.04				Los Angeles
Pacific Electric Building	0	Alhambra–San Gabriel, Annandale, Balboa, Fullerton, Hawthorne–El Segundo, La Habra–Yorba Linda, Long Beach, Monrovia–Glendora, Mount Lowe, Pasadena Short Line, Pasadena via Oak Knoll, Pomona, Riverside–Rialto, San Pedro via Dominguez, San Pedro via Gardena, Santa Ana, Santa Monica Air Line, Soldiers' Home, South Pasadena Local, Whittier; Los Angeles Railway B, H, J, R, 7, and 8	1905	1961	Los Angeles
