= Sawtelle Veterans Home =

Care home for United States military veterans (1887–1927)

Coordinates: 34.058°N 118.458°W

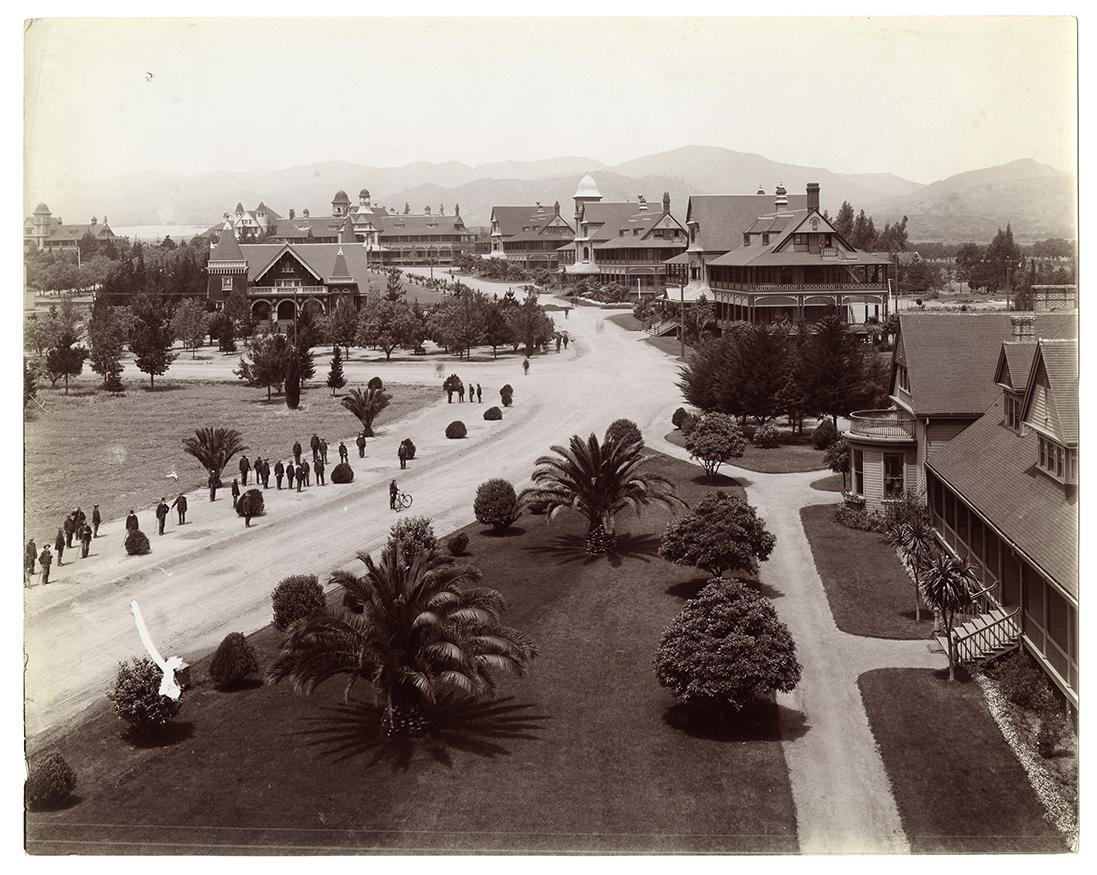
Sawtelle Veterans Home

The Sawtelle Veterans Home was a care home for disabled American veterans in Sawtelle, Los Angeles, California, United States. The Home, formally the Pacific Branch of the National Home for Disabled Volunteer Soldiers, was established in 1887 on 300 acres (1.2 km^{2}) of Rancho San Vicente y Santa Monica lands donated by Senator John P. Jones and Arcadia B. de Baker.

The following year, the site grew by an additional 200 acres (0.81 km^{2}); in 1890, 20 acres (0.081 km^{2}) more were appended for use as a veterans' cemetery. With more than 1,000 veterans in residence, a new hospital was erected in 1900. This hospital was replaced in 1927 by the James W. Wadsworth Hospital, now known as the West Los Angeles VA Medical Center.

The Sawtelle Veterans Home was believed to be the ground zero for the introduction of non-native fox squirrels in western North America.

== National Asylum for Disabled Volunteer Soldiers ==
In 1865, Congress passed legislation to incorporate the National Asylum for Disabled Volunteer Soldiers and Sailors of the Civil War. Volunteers were not eligible for care in the existing regular army and navy home facilities. This legislation, one of the last Acts signed by President Lincoln, marked the entrance of the United States into the direct provision of care for the temporary versus career military. The Asylum was renamed the National Home for Disabled Volunteer Soldiers (NHDVS) in 1873. It was also known colloquially as the Old Soldiers Home. Between 1867 and 1929, the Home expanded to ten branches and one sanatorium.

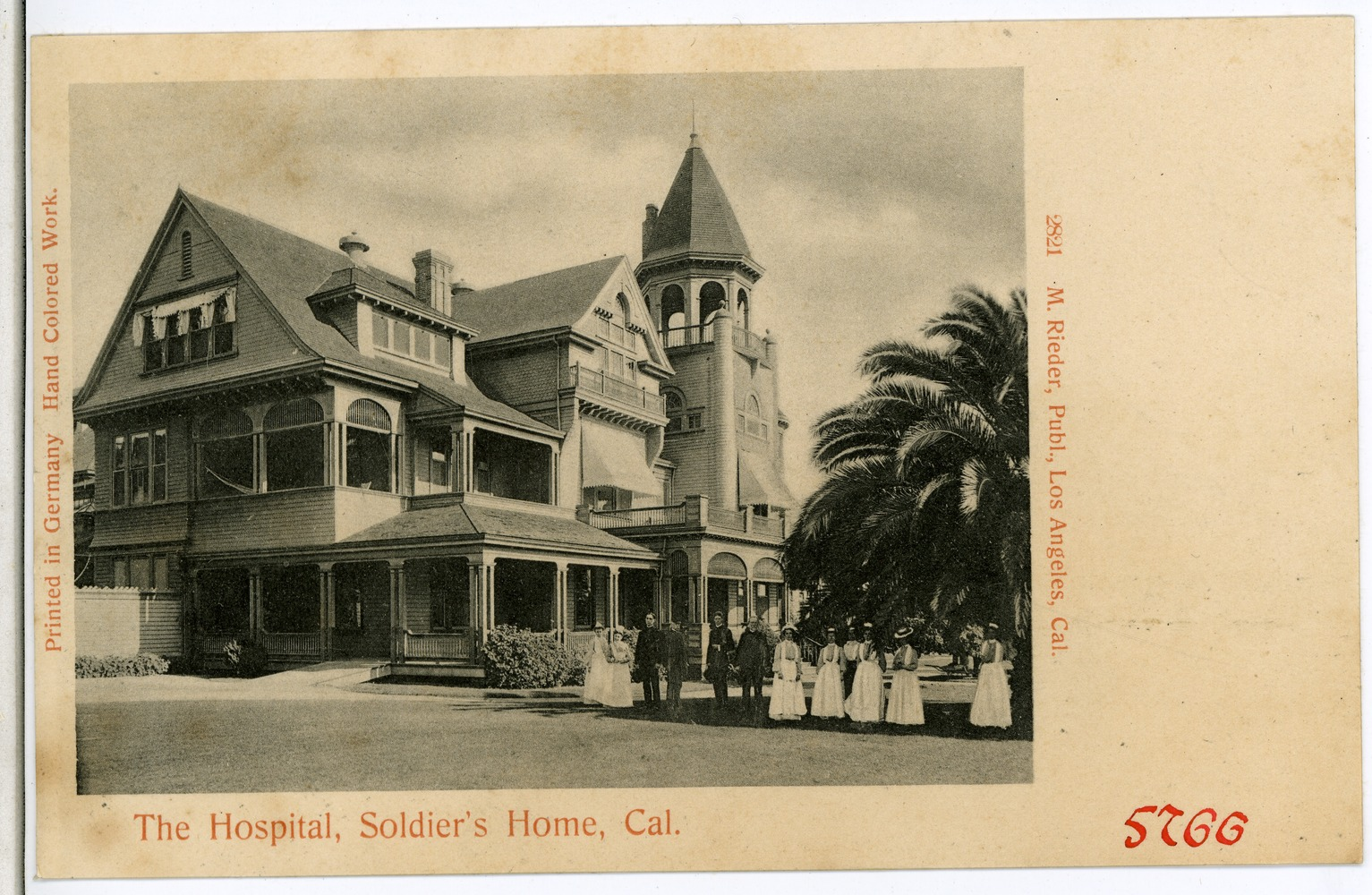
Soldier's Home, 1905

The Board of Managers were empowered to establish the Home at such locations as they deemed appropriate and to establish those programs that they determined necessary. The Home was a unique creation of the Congress. While the Managers included, ex-officio, the President of the United States, the Secretary of War and the Chief Justice of the United States, it was not a part of the Executive branch of government. Its budget requests in later years were submitted in conjunction with the War Department. But throughout its existence, until 1930, the Board of Managers consistently defended its independence of the Executive Branch.

In 1900 admission was extended to all honorably discharged officers, soldiers and sailors who served in regular or volunteer forces of the United States in any war in which the country had been engaged and who were disabled, who had no adequate means of support and were incapable of earning a living. As formal declarations of war were not the rule in the Indian Wars, Congress specifically extended eligibility for the Home to those who "served against hostile Indians" in 1908. Veterans who served in the Philippines, China and Alaska were covered in 1909.

== Pacific Branch ==
Due to increased demand as a result of widening of admission standards, in 1887 Congress approved the establishment of a Pacific Branch of the Home. The Pacific Branch was established under an act of Congress approved March 2, 1887, entitled "An act to provide for the location and erection of a Branch Home for Disabled Volunteer Soldiers west of the Rocky Mountains."

=== Land donation ===
The proposed establishment prompted intense competition, as local promoters recognized the value of a prominent, prestigious institution. The selected site for the Pacific Branch on land near Santa Monica was influenced by donations of land (300 acres (1.2 km^{2})) and cash ($100,000) and water (120,000 gallons per day) from Senator John P. Jones and Robert S. Baker, and his wife Arcadia Bandini de Stearns Baker. Jones and Baker were involved in the development of Santa Monica and believed the Pacific Branch would contribute to the growth of the community and the area. The Wolfskill ranch owners east of Sepulveda Boulevard donated a tract of 330 acres (1.3 km^{2}).

=== Development ===
The Pacific Branch opened in 1888 on 713 acres (2.89 km^{2}) of land. Prominent architect Stanford White is credited with designing the original shingle style frame barracks. J. Lee Burton designed a streetcar depot and the shingle style chapel in 1900. The Barry Hospital was built in sections from 1891 to 1909. Plantings of pines, palm trees, and eucalyptus groves transformed the site from its treeless state.

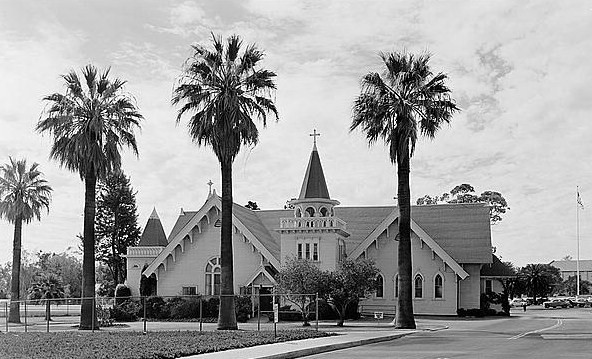
Chapel.

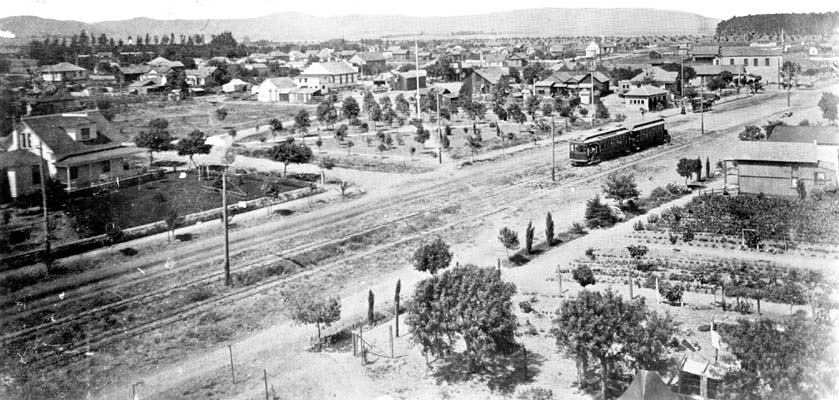
Street Car

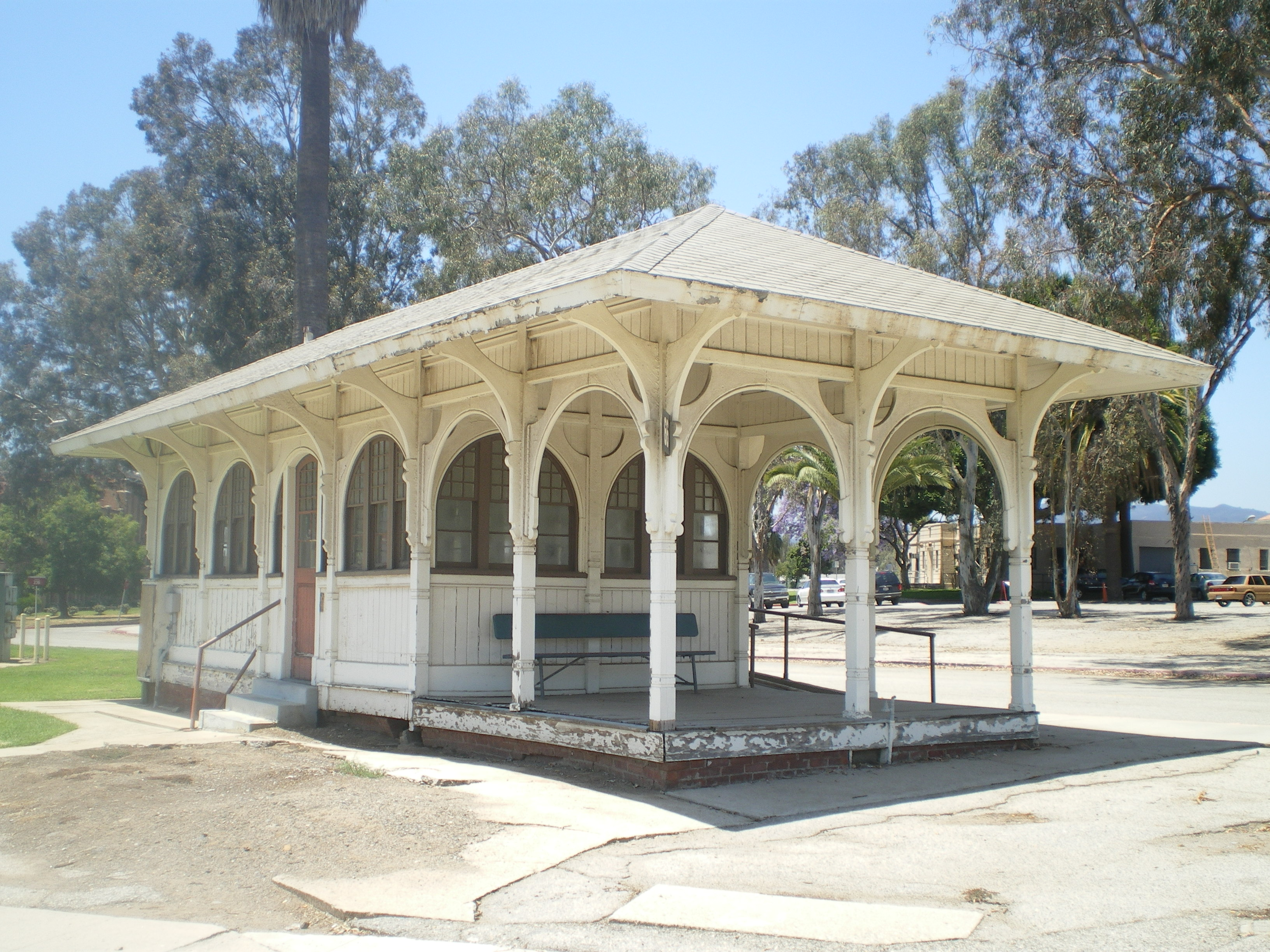
Street Car Depot

=== Administration ===
Although the Board of Managers established regulations for the operation of the NHDVS system and oversaw those operations, many decisions were made at the local level by local managers (who were members of the Board of Managers)

Date	Pacific Branch – Local Managers
1889–1891	Henry H. Markham
1891–1892	George H. Bonebrake
1892–1898	Andrew W. Barrett
1898–1904	William H. Bonsall
1904–	Henry H. Markham

or branch governors (chief administrative officers).

Date	Pacific Branch – Governors
1888–1894	Colonel Charles Treichel (1842–1894)
1894–1897	Colonel J.G. Rowland ( – )
1897–1899	Colonel Andrew Jackson Smith (1838–1913)
1899–1908	General Oscar Hugh La Grange (1837–1915)
1908–1913	Colonel Thomas J. Cochrane ( – )
1913–	General Patrick H. Barry (1844– )

In 1889, the Board of Managers conducted an investigation of the Pacific Branch after a number of charges, including poor treatment of members, bad food, and corrupt management, were leveled. The Board found little cause for concern, as their only action was to remind the governor of the Branch of his responsibilities.

In 1912, the US Senate, prompted by newspaper reports, investigated the operations of Pacific Branch but found little basis for the charges.

=== Other notable people ===
Other notable people associated with the Pacific Branch include:

Person	Association
Nicholas Porter Earp	Died at the Home in 1907
Scott Hastings	Died at the Home in 1907
Hermann Edward Hasse (1836–1915)	Chief surgeon at the Home (1888–1905) who had a particular interest in lichens
John Johnston (aka Liver Eating Johnson)	Frontiersman, deputy, Union Soldier died 1900 at the home
Robert W. Patten (aka the Umbrella Man)	Civil War veteran, gained fame in late years as eccentric in Seattle, with a cartoon series modeled after him
James Wolcott Wadsworth	President of the Board of Managers NHDVS

=== Sawtelle ===
The Pacific Branch served as an attraction for both tourists and local real estate speculators. In 1904, Los Angeles Pacific Railroad's branch became a stop on the Balloon Route – a popular tour of local attractions conducted by an entrepreneur who escorted tourists via a rented streetcar. In 1905, residential lots and larger tracts in the new Westgate Subdivision, which joined “the beautiful Soldier's Home”, and which was owned and promoted by Jones and Baker's Santa Monica Land and Water Company, were for sale. The new community of Sawtelle developed around the Pacific Branch when veterans’ families, as well as veterans themselves who were drawing relief, settled there.

=== James W. Wadsworth Hospital ===
Following World War I, a new governmental agency, the Veterans Bureau, was created to provide for the hospitalization and rehabilitation of this much younger group of veterans. The development of medical facilities for veterans during the 1920s fueled a burst of construction during that decade, including Colonial Revival staff residences. The James W. Wadsworth Hospital opened in 1927, replacing the Barry Hospital.

=== Veterans Administration ===
The National Home and the Veterans Bureau, were combined into the United States Veterans Administration by President Hoover in 1930. Planning began for a major building campaign, including Mission/Spanish Colonial style hospital buildings and a group of Romanesque-inspired research buildings. The present Wadsworth hospital was constructed in the late 1930s. A new theater replaced the former Ward Theater in 1940. Most of the 1890s era buildings were demolished in the 1960s. The Veterans Affairs (VA) hospital building (VA Wadsworth Medical Center) was opened in 1977.

==== VA West Los Angeles Medical Center ====
The VA West Los Angeles Medical Center of the VA Greater Los Angeles Health Care System is a hospital and tertiary health care facility south of Wilshire Boulevard and west of the San Diego Freeway on the Sawtelle Campus. It provides a broad range of health care services to veterans. The largest of the VA's health care campuses, it is a part of the VA Desert Pacific Network.
