= Vernon station =

Los Angeles Metro Rail station

Vernon
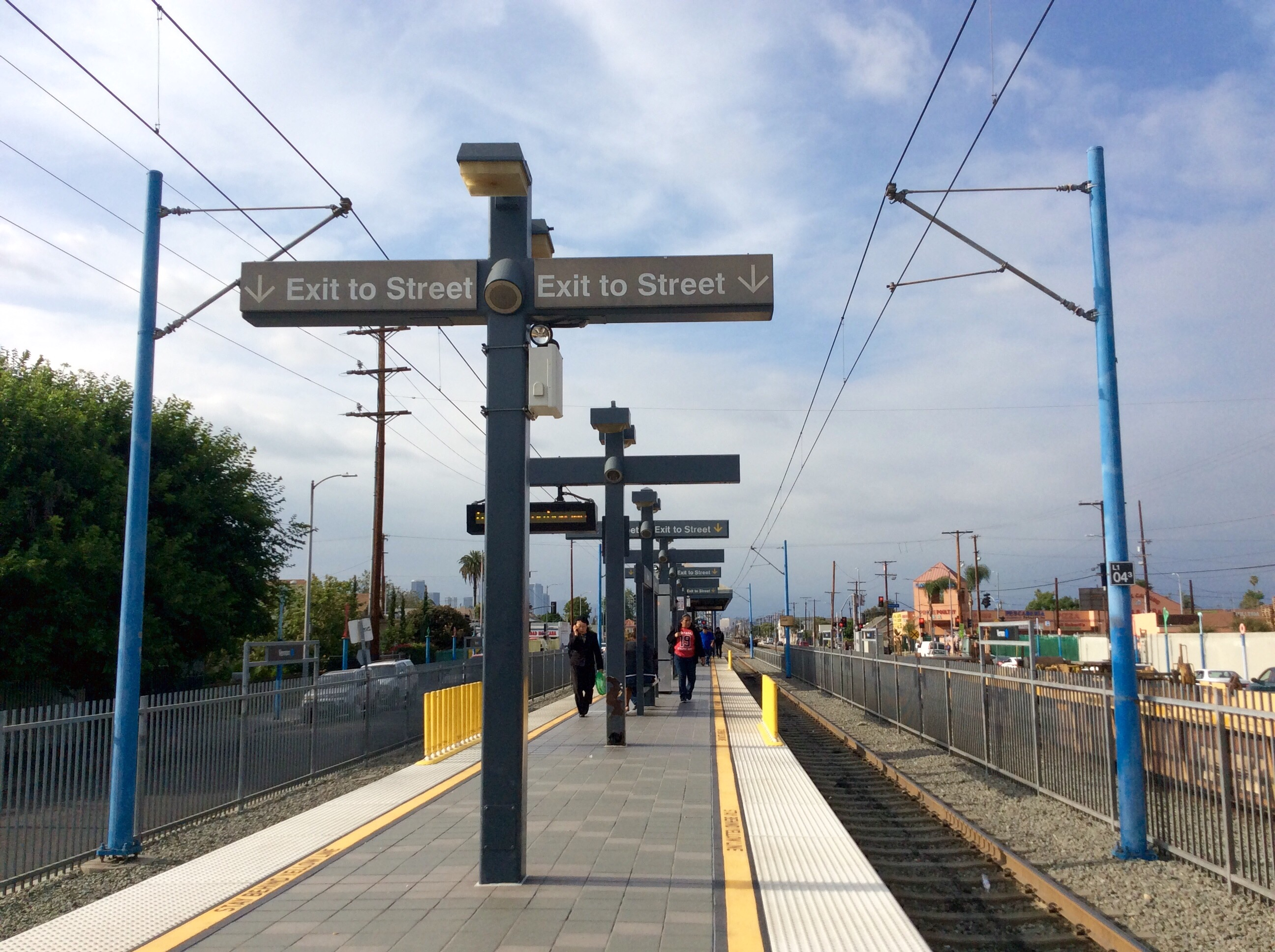
- Vernon station platform

General information
- Location: 4421 Long Beach Avenue; Los Angeles, California
- Coordinates: 34.0037°N 118.2432°W
- Owner: Los Angeles County Metropolitan Transportation Authority
- Platforms: 1 island platform
- Tracks: 2
- Connections: Los Angeles Metro Bus; LADOT DASH

Construction
- Structure type: At-grade
- Accessible: Yes

History
- Opened: July 14, 1990; 36 years ago
- Rebuilt: November 2, 2019

Passengers
- FY 2025: 1,670 (avg. wkdy boardings)

Services
Preceding station	Metro Rail	Following station
Slauson toward Long Beach	A Line	Washington toward Pomona
Former services (as Vernon Avenue)
Preceding station	Pacific Electric	Following station
Slauson Junction toward Morgan Avenue	Long Beach	Pacific Electric Building Terminus
Slauson Junction toward Balboa	Balboa	Pacific Electric Building Terminus
Slauson Junction toward San Pedro	San Pedro via Dominguez	Pacific Electric Building Terminus
Slauson Junction toward San Pedro	San Pedro via Gardena	Pacific Electric Building Terminus
Slauson Junction toward Santa Ana SP Depot	Santa Ana	Pacific Electric Building Terminus
Slauson Junction toward Clifton	Redondo Beach via Gardena	Pacific Electric Building Terminus
Slauson Junction toward El Segundo	Hawthorne–El Segundo	Pacific Electric Building Terminus
Slauson Junction toward Whittier	Whittier	Pacific Electric Building Terminus
Slauson Junction toward Fullerton	Fullerton	Pacific Electric Building Terminus
Slauson Junction toward San Pedro	San Pedro via Dominguez	Pacific Electric Building Terminus
Slauson Junction toward Yorba Linda	La Habra–Yorba Linda	Pacific Electric Building Terminus
47th Street toward Watts	Watts; Local	40th Street toward Pacific Electric Building
Preceding station	Los Angeles Railway	Following station
Vernon and Morgan toward Los Angeles City College	V	Vernon and Alameda toward Pacific Crossing
Location

Vernon station is an at-grade light rail station on the A Line of the Los Angeles Metro Rail system. The station is located in the center median of Long Beach Avenue (the historic route of the Pacific Electric Railway, and shared with the Union Pacific freight railroad's Wilmington Subdivision) at its intersection with Vernon Avenue, in South Los Angeles, one-quarter mile (0.4 km) from the border with Vernon, California.

Prior to the construction of the A Line, Vernon Avenue was an important junction on the lines of the Pacific Electric. All lines from the Southern District, including the Long Beach, Watts, Whittier and San Pedro lines, stopped at Vernon Avenue, which was also a crossing with the Los Angeles Railway's V line.

== Service ==
=== Hours and frequency ===
A Line service hours are from approximately 4:30 a.m. and 11:45 p.m. daily. Trains operate every 8 minutes during peak hours, Monday to Friday. Trains run every 10 minutes, during midday on weekdays and weekends, from 9:00 a.m. to 7:00 p.m. Night and early morning service is approximately every 20 minutes every day.

=== Connections ===
As of December 15, 2024, the following connections are available:

- Los Angeles Metro Bus: 105, 611
- LADOT DASH: Pueblo Del Rio, Southeast

== Notable places nearby ==
The station is within walking distance of the following notable places:

- Jefferson High School
- Pueblo Del Rio Housing Complex
- Fred Roberts Park
- Ross Snyder Recreation Center
- Alameda Swap Meet
