= Paramount/Rosecrans station =

Planned Los Angeles Metro Rail light rail station

Paramount/Rosecrans

General information
- Location: Paramount, California
- Coordinates: 33.903908°N 118.160666°W

Other information
- Status: Planned

History
- Opened: c. 1905 (Pacific Electric)
- Closed: 1958 (Pacific Electric)
- Rebuilt: 2035 (estimated)

Future services
Preceding station	Metro Rail	Following station
I-105/C Line toward Slauson	Southeast Gateway Line Phase 1	Bellflower toward Pioneer

Former services (as Paramount)
Preceding station	Pacific Electric	Following station
Michigan Avenue toward Pacific Electric Building	Santa Ana	New York Avenue toward Santa Ana SP Depot
Location

Paramount/Rosecrans station is a planned elevated light rail station in the Los Angeles Metro Rail system. It is located at the intersection of Paramount Boulevard and Rosecrans Avenue in Paramount, California and is part of the Southeast Gateway Line project. The segment of the corridor is expected to begin operations in 2035.

The station is located adjacent to the former Pacific Electric West Santa Ana Branch Clearwater stop, later renamed to Paramount.
