= Santa Ana Line =

Santa Ana
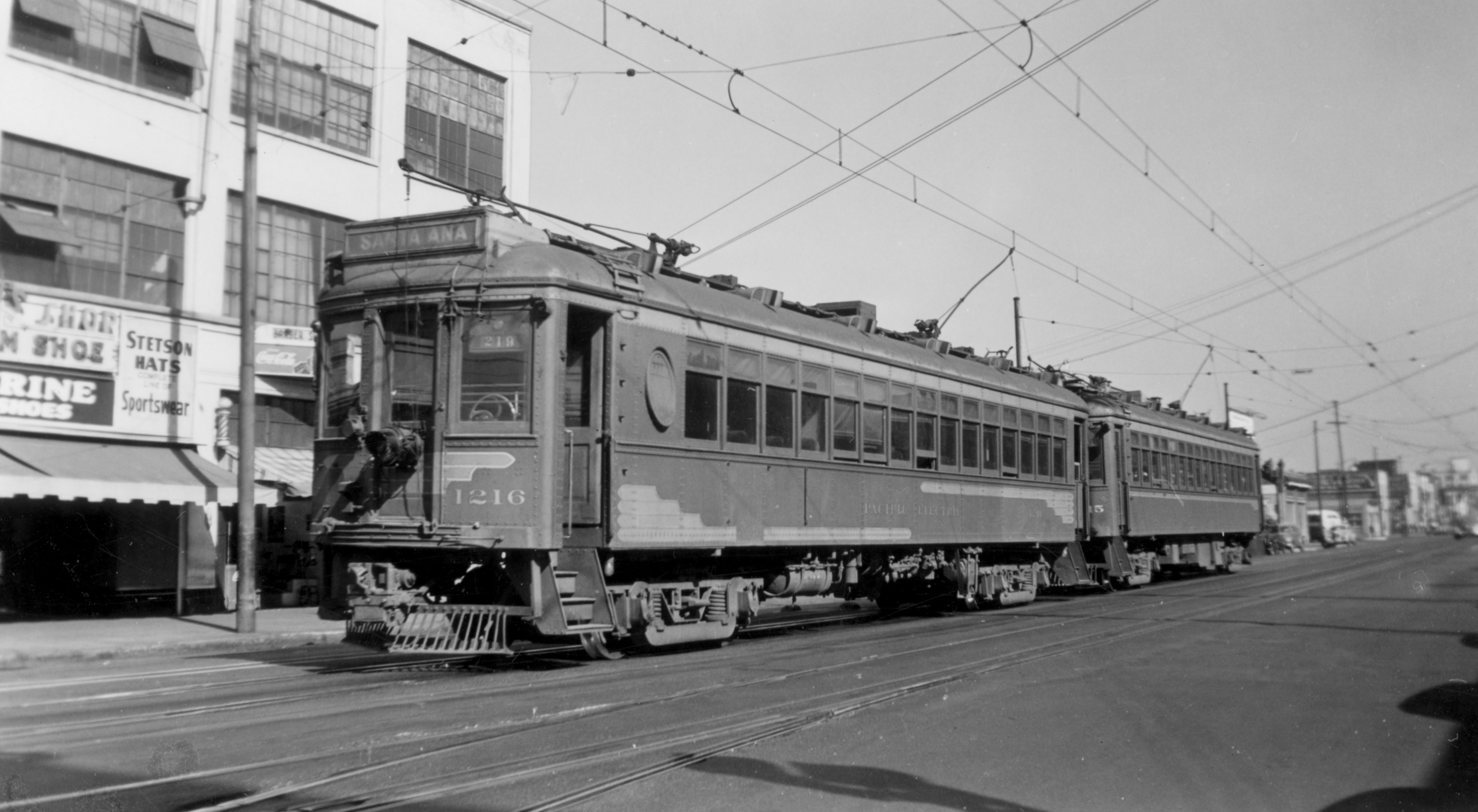
- A PE train on San Pedro Street, Los Angeles, en route to Santa Ana in the 1940s

Overview
- Owner: Los Angeles Inter-Urban Electric Railway (1905–1911) Pacific Electric (1911–1953) Metropolitan Coach Lines (1953–1958) Los Angeles Metropolitan Transit Authority (1958)
- Line number: 11 (to 1958); 34 (1958)
- Locale: Los Angeles and Orange County, California
- Termini: Downtown Los Angeles; Santa Ana, California Bellflower, California (after 1950)
- Stations: 30

Service
- Type: Interurban
- System: Pacific Electric
- Operator: Pacific Electric
- Rolling stock: PE 300–400 Class (last used)

History
- Opened: November 6, 1905
- Closed: July 2, 1950 (to Santa Ana); May 24, 1958

Technical
- Line length: 34 mi (55 km)
- Number of tracks: 1–4
- Track gauge: 1,435 mm (4 ft 8 1/2 in) standard gauge
- Electrification: Overhead line, 600 V DC

The Santa Ana Line was an interurban route connecting Los Angeles and Santa Ana in Orange County. It ran between 1905 and 1958 (with the southern end truncated to Bellflower in 1950) and was predominantly operated by the Pacific Electric Railway for its history.

== History ==
The route began operation on November 6, 1905 under the Los Angeles Inter-Urban Electric Railway; Pacific Electric leased the line starting in 1908 and fully acquired it in 1911 under terms of the Great Merger. At the time of the merger, running times between termini was 75 minutes. Short turns at Artesia began in 1917, though these were cut back to Bellflower in November 1927. Santa Ana's status as the county seat and largest city in Orange County at the time allowed for high ridership. The railway built a new station in the city in late 1927, and cars were rerouted to serve it.

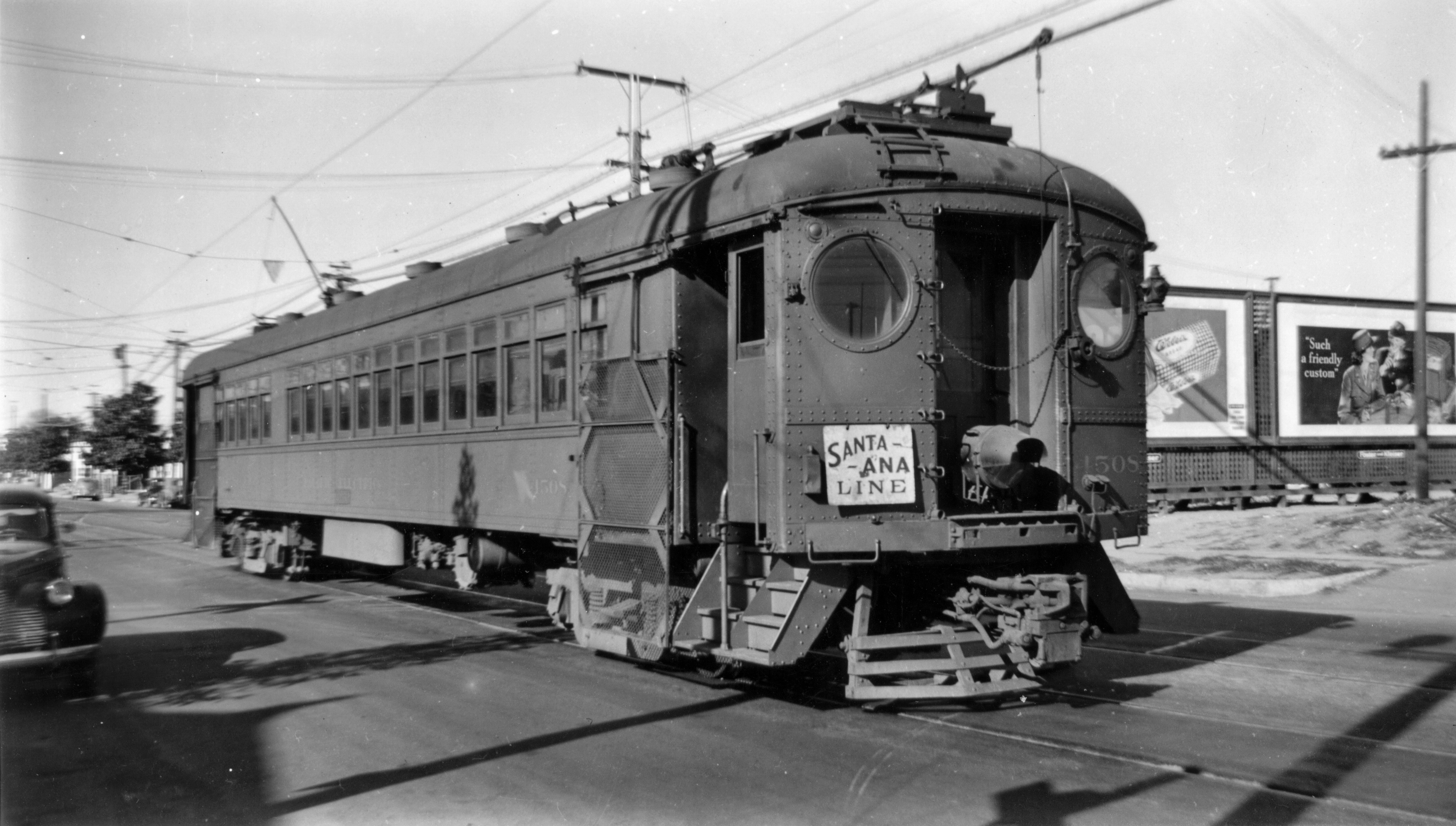
Car 4508 in service on the line, c. 1943

Cars ceased running to the Santa Ana Southern Pacific Depot in November 1945. By 1950, service had halved from its peak only five years earlier and the line was cut back to the minor station in Bellflower on July 2, becoming the Bellflower Line. (PE continued to serve the Bellflower to Santa Ana segment with motor coaches.) The service was then disposed of by Pacific Electric, being taken over first by Metropolitan Coach Lines as its line 11 in 1953 before being commuted to the Los Angeles Metropolitan Transit Authority in 1958, the same year it was discontinued; the last train ran on May 24, 1958. Bellflower Line service was briefly designated as line 34 for just over a month prior to discontinuance.

=== Modern services ===
The Los Angeles Metro Rail operates a few light rail lines over the former route. The A Line runs over the former Watts Line as far as Watts, and the C Line and Century Freeway were built through Lynwood on the old Pacific Electric right of way.

The Southeast Gateway Line is a plan to reactivate part of the line in Los Angeles County for expanded light rail service. The section between Bellflower station and former Paramount station will be rehabilitated and connected to a new service eventually terminating downtown, though via a different routing than the former Santa Ana Line.

The OC Streetcar is expected to open in 2026 and run on the southern section of the former Santa Ana Line between Santa Ana and Garden Grove.

== Route ==
The Santa Ana Line ran from the Pacific Electric Building in Los Angeles to the Southern Pacific depot in Santa Ana, California via the Watts Line and West Santa Ana Branch. The latter segment's diagonal running was a stark contrast to the cardinally-aligned road grid of Los Angeles and Orange Counties.

The route was quadruple-tracked through the Watts trunk line, while the Santa Ana Branch was double-tracked except at single-track bridges.

== List of major stations ==
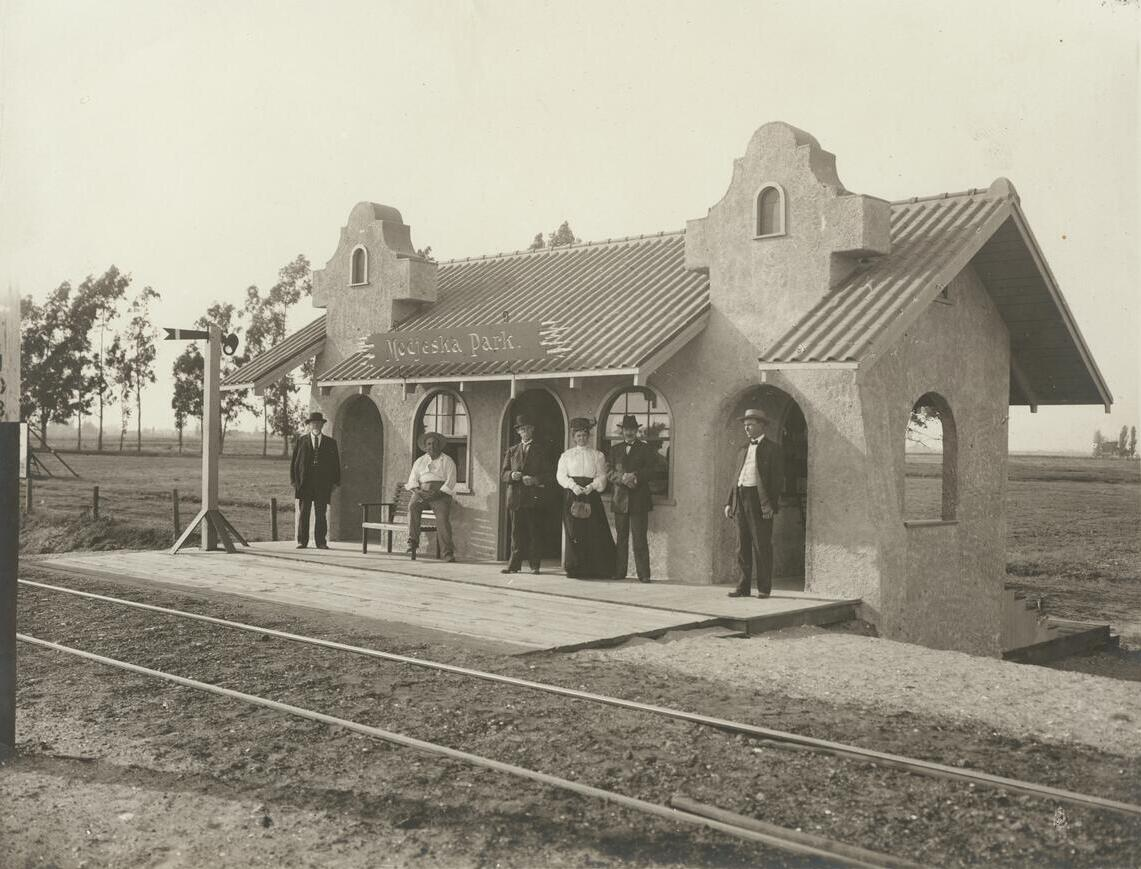
Modjeska Park station, c. 1900–1910

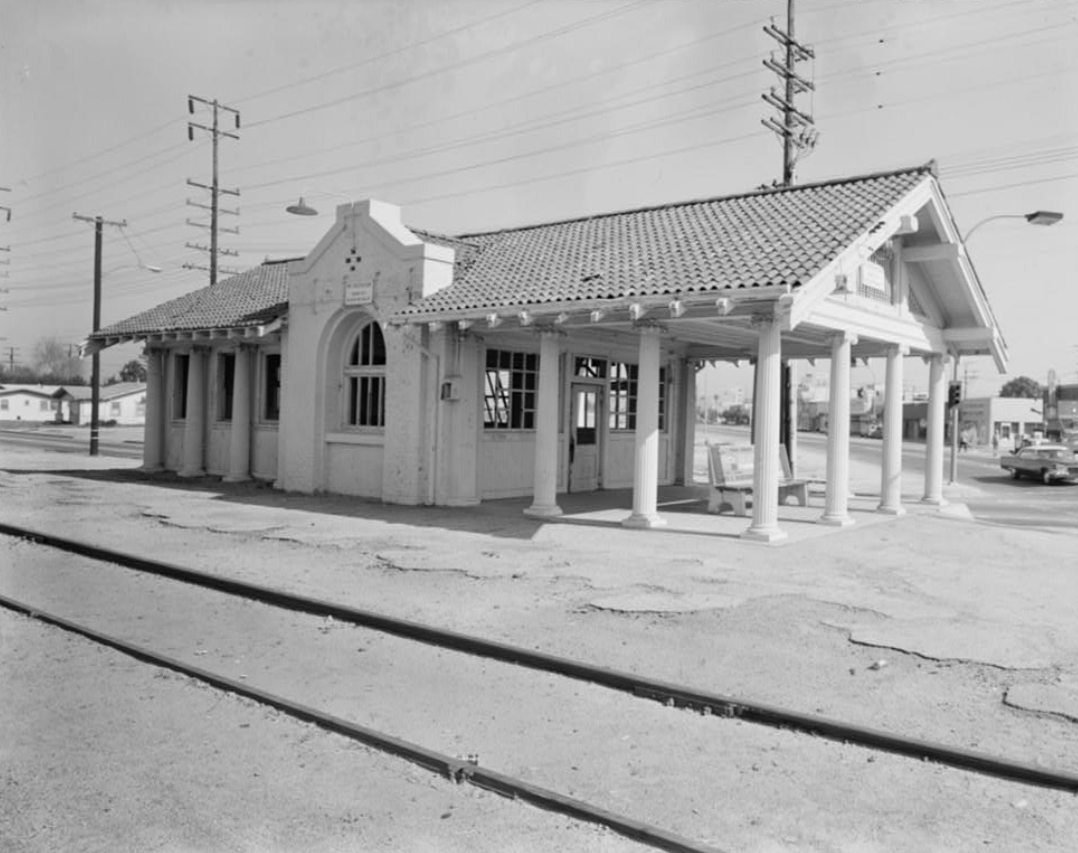
Lynwood Depot

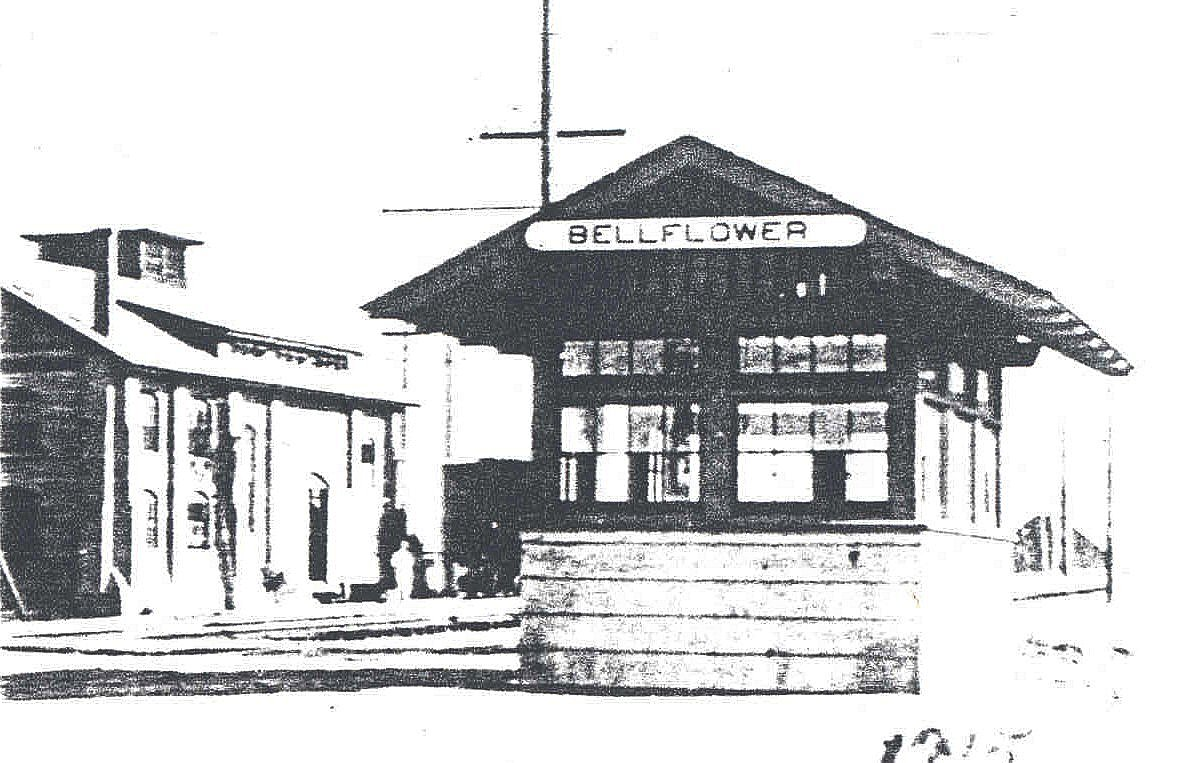
The first Bellflower Pacific Electric Depot, c. 1915

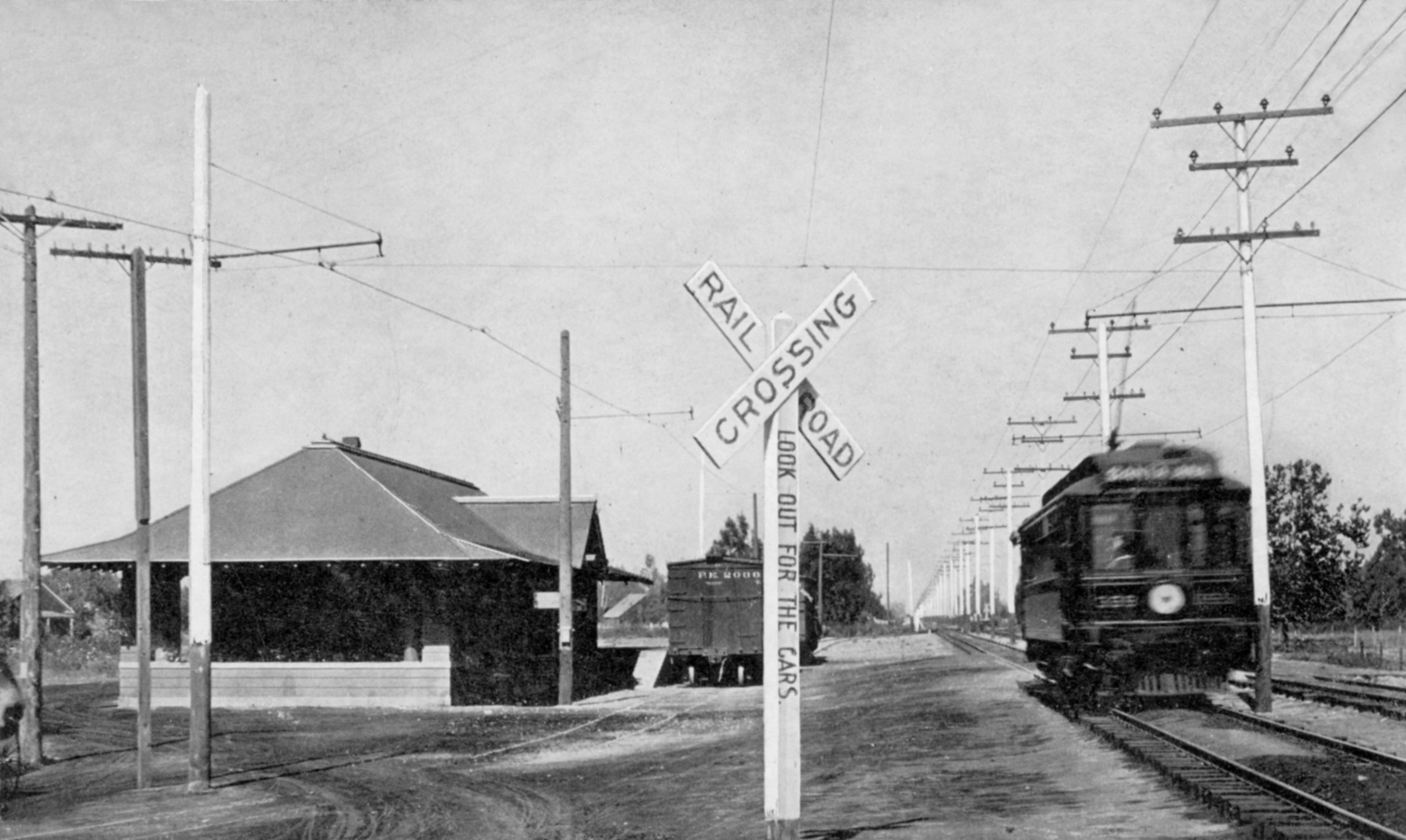
Garden Grove station, c. 1909

Station	Mile	Major connections	Date opened	Date discontinued	City
Pacific Electric Building	0.00	Alhambra–San Gabriel, Annandale, Balboa, Fullerton, Hawthorne–El Segundo, La Habra–Yorba Linda, Long Beach, Monrovia–Glendora, Mount Lowe, Pasadena Short Line, Pasadena via Oak Knoll, Pomona, Redlands, Redondo Beach via Gardena, Riverside–Rialto, San Pedro via Dominguez, San Pedro via Gardena, Santa Monica Air Line, Sierra Madre, Soldiers' Home, South Pasadena Local, Upland–San Bernardino, Watts, Whittier; Los Angeles Railway B, H, J, R, 7, and 8	1905	1958	Los Angeles
Slauson Junction	4.27	Balboa, Fullerton, Hawthorne–El Segundo, La Habra–Yorba Linda, Long Beach, Redondo Beach via Gardena, San Pedro via Dominguez, San Pedro via Gardena, Watts, Whittier	1902	1958	Los Angeles
Watts	7.45	Balboa, Hawthorne–El Segundo, Long Beach, Redondo Beach via Gardena, San Pedro via Dominguez, San Pedro via Gardena, Watts	1902	1958	Los Angeles
Lynwood	9.70			1958	Lynwood
Morton	11.55			1958	
Paramount (Clearwater)	13.06			1958	Paramount
Bellflower	15.40			1958	Bellflower
Artesia	18.43		1911	1950	Artesia
Cypress	21.70			1950	Cypress
Stanton	24.82			1950	Stanton
Garden Grove	28.56			1950	Garden Grove
Santa Ana–Pacific Electric	33.61	Santa Ana–Huntington Beach, Santa Ana–Orange	1927	1950	Santa Ana
Santa Ana–Southern Pacific	34.00	Southern Pacific		1945	Santa Ana

== Ridership ==
Passengers (Fare and transfer)
Year	Passengers	Car miles	Revenue	Inflation adjusted (2025)
1914	1,143,675	856,229	$291,282	$9,362,636
1916	936,257	578,574	$225,501	$6,671,933
1918	1,193,306	735,322	$243,536	$5,212,856
1920	1,090,490	638,275	$268,927	$4,322,041
1922	888,531	548,292	$297,578	$5,723,792
1924	881,931	566,542	$313,478	$5,889,126
1926	734,529	536.202	$255,610	$4,648,547
1928	751,032	502,058	$230,200	$4,316,250
1930	852,268	583,690	$219,719	$4,234,624
1932	446,876	460,756	$132,140	
1934	367,159	404,580	$104,190	
1936	369,230	360,656	$106,812	
1938	315,603	339,949	$95,354	
1940	343,984	348,885	$81,612	$1,875,525
1942	750,758	440,797	$199,061	
1944	2,270,201	1,001,143	$590,800	
1945	2,479,246	1,030,924	$635,905	$11,372,238
1946	2,231,655	894,937	$501,139	
1947	2,064,688	795,527	$492,843	
1950	1,046,974	398,694	$277,422	$3,712,390
1952	884,177	258,293	$235,566	$2,856,016
1954	704,078	223,732	$222,140	$2,663,203
1956	651,181	221,658	$240,198	$2,844,450
1958	181,167	80,499	$71,681	$799,900
