= Bellflower station =

Planned Los Angeles Metro Rail light rail station

Bellflower
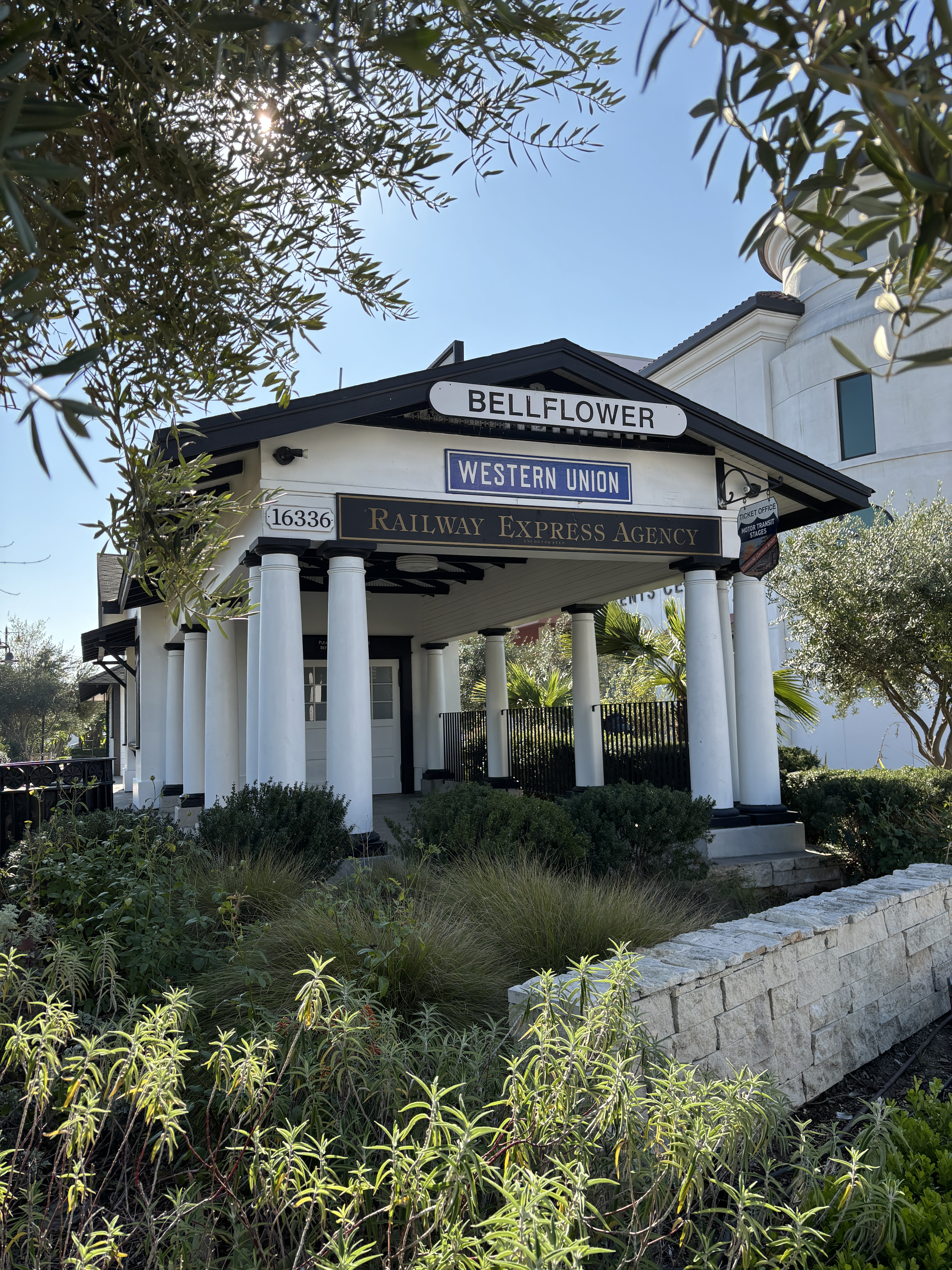
- Historic Pacific Electric depot building

General information
- Location: 16336 Bellflower Boulevard; Bellflower, California
- Coordinates: 33.885662°N 118.125117°W

Other information
- Status: Planned

History
- Opened: November 6, 1905 (Pacific Electric)
- Closed: May 24, 1958 (Pacific Electric)
- Rebuilt: 1927; 2035 (estimated)

Future services
Preceding station	Metro Rail	Following station
Paramount/Rosecrans toward Slauson	Southeast Gateway Line Phase 1	Pioneer Terminus

Former services
Preceding station	Pacific Electric	Following station
Rendalia toward Pacific Electric Building	Santa Ana	Woodruff Avenue before 1950 toward Santa Ana SP Depot
Location

Bellflower station is a planned light rail station in the Los Angeles Metro Rail system. It is part of the Southeast Gateway Line project. The segment of the corridor is expected to begin operations in 2035.

== Pacific Electric station ==
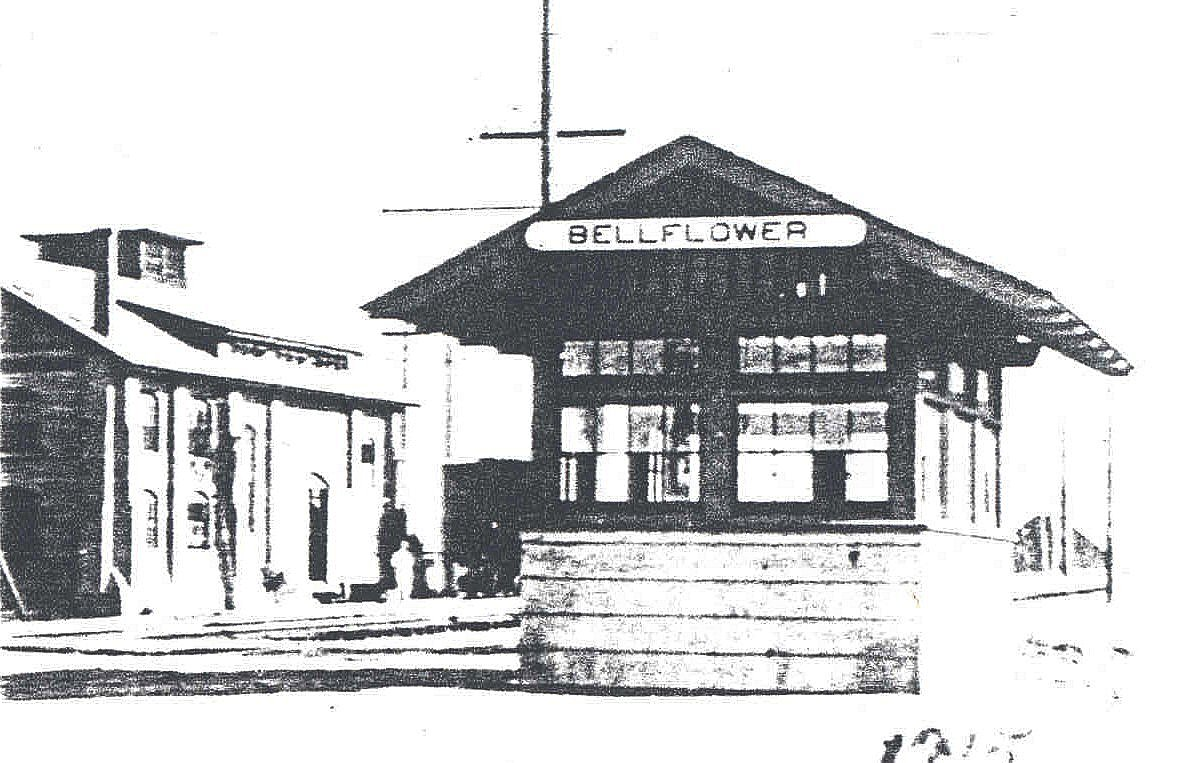
The first Bellflower Pacific Electric Depot, c. 1915

The station is located across Bellflower Boulevard from the former Pacific Electric West Santa Ana Branch depot.

The depot site was established in 1905 with the commencement of service along the Santa Ana Branch. Early maps use the former name of the town for the stop: Somerset. A new expanded station was built in 1927. Bellflower became the southeast terminus of the line after 1950 as service was cut back from Santa Ana. Passenger service ceased after May 24, 1958.

The station building was restored in 2008 by the city of Bellflower. It reverted to the original 1927 facade which features distinctive columns.
