= Fullerton Line =

Pacific Electric interurban route in California

Fullerton

Overview
- Owner: Southern Pacific Railroad
- Locale: Los Angeles, the Gateway Cities and Orange County
- Termini: Downtown Los Angeles; Fullerton, California
- Stations: 40

Service
- Type: Interurban
- System: Pacific Electric
- Operator(s): Pacific Electric
- Rolling stock: PE 220 Class (last used)
- Ridership: 100,105 (1926)

History
- Opened: 1917
- Closed: January 22, 1938 (passenger) c. 1940s–1962 (freight)

Technical
- Number of tracks: 1–4
- Track gauge: 4 ft 8 1/2 in (1,435 mm) standard gauge
- Electrification: Overhead line, 600 V DC

The Fullerton Line was an interurban route of the Pacific Electric Railway. It ran between Downtown Los Angeles and Fullerton, California. It opened in 1917 and hosted passenger service until 1938; the line was retained for freight for some time thereafter. After abandonment, the right of way between La Habra and Fullerton was mostly converted to a rail trail or built over.

== History ==
The line, among the electric railway's final expansions, was not originally intended for passenger service unless a connection to Orange was completed. Despite this, the route was opened for service in 1917. (Note: Veysey gives two dates for the possible start of service: September 30 and December 7) Pacific Electric spent $425,000 on the extension from La Habra to Fullerton ($10.4 million in 2024 adjusted for inflation).

The route was not a significant source of passenger traffic, but did generate revenue by hauling citrus fruit from the area. PE reported losses on the line of $1,610 for travel in the year 1934 (equivalent to $37,843 in 2024). In September 1935, service was reduced to one daily shuttle trip running between Fullerton and Laon Junction, then the inbound trip reversing to Yorba Linda. PE discontinued passenger service to Fullerton on January 22, 1938. Landowners along the line petitioned for its total closure in 1939, but freight traffic continued until the late 1940s or as late as about 1962.

One of the more prominent landmarks on the line was a concrete arch bridge over Harbor Boulevard that was emblazoned with a message welcoming visitors to Fullerton. The bridge was razed in 1964 to ease clearances for trucks.

Part of the former right of way became a section of the Juanita Cooke Greenbelt & Trail. The Southeast Gateway Line light rail project is expected to use a section of the line between Slauson and the former Los Angeles and Salt Lake Railroad right of way. The right of way through Fullerton had been sold off and largely developed by 2023.

== Route ==
The Fullerton Line followed the Long Beach Line from Los Angeles south to Slauson Junction (south of Slauson Boulevard) where it branched off in an easterly direction to Whittier and Yorba Linda. From there, the double track line ran easterly, in private way between dual roadways of Randolph Street, through Huntington Park, Vernon, Bell, and Maywood to reach the Los Angeles River. Crossing the river, the double track in private way followed intermittent sections of Randolph Street through Bell Gardens and Commerce, and crossed the Rio Hondo south of Slauson Avenue.

The line continued easterly, south and parallel to, Slauson Avenue, across the Pico Rivera area and the San Gabriel River into Los Nietos, where the line crossed the Atchison, Topeka and Santa Fe Railway Third District main line (Los Nietos) at Norwalk Boulevard. The single track La Habra–Fullerton–Yorba Linda Line branched easterly in private way off the Whittier Line at Los Nietos, crossed Norwalk Boulevard and went through Whittier at the south edge of the city limits. After crossing Mills Avenue the track ran adjacent to and north of Lambert Road until crossing 1st Street. Here the line turned easterly through La Habra to Laon Junction (3rd Avenue at College Street), where the single track Fullerton Line branched to the south.

The track traversed the West Coyote Hills, crossing the Union Pacific line and an AT&SF spur before descending into Fullerton and crossing over Harbor Boulevard on a concrete arch bridge. The right of way then turned south to cut through the Fullerton College campus on what was called "Boxcar Avenue". After crossing Commonwealth Avenue, the tracks swung around a small car yard to briefly run west on Santa Fe Avenue before arriving at the Fullerton depot.

=== List of major stations ===
Station	Major connections	Date opened	Date closed	City
Pacific Electric Building	Alhambra–San Gabriel, Annandale, Balboa, Hawthorne–El Segundo, La Habra–Yorba Linda, Long Beach, Monrovia–Glendora, Mount Lowe, Pasadena Short Line, Pasadena via Oak Knoll, Pomona, Redlands, Redondo Beach via Gardena, Riverside–Rialto, San Pedro via Dominguez, San Pedro via Gardena, Santa Ana, Santa Monica Air Line, Sierra Madre, Soldiers' Home, South Pasadena Local, Upland–San Bernardino, Whittier; Los Angeles Railway B, H, J, R, 7, and 8	1905	1961	Los Angeles
Amoco	Balboa, Hawthorne–El Segundo, La Habra–Yorba Linda, Long Beach, Redondo Beach via Gardena, San Pedro via Dominguez, San Pedro via Gardena, Santa Ana, Santa Monica Air Line, Soldiers' Home, Whittier	1902	1961	Los Angeles
Slauson Junction	Balboa, Hawthorne–El Segundo, La Habra–Yorba Linda, Long Beach, Redondo Beach via Gardena, San Pedro via Dominguez, San Pedro via Gardena, Santa Ana, Whittier	1902	1961	Los Angeles
Los Nietos	La Habra–Yorba Linda, Whittier	1903	1941	Santa Fe Springs
La Habra	La Habra–Yorba Linda	1911	1938	La Habra
Fullerton	Atchison, Topeka, and Santa Fe Railroad	1917	1938	Fullerton
