= Pioneer station =

Future light rail station in Artesia, California

Pioneer

General information
- Location: Pioneer Boulevard; Artesia, California
- Coordinates: 33°51′37.8″N 118°04′56.7″W

Other information
- Status: Planned

History
- Opened: 1906 (Pacific Electric)
- Closed: 1950 (Pacific Electric)
- Rebuilt: 2035 (estimated)

Future services
Preceding station	Metro Rail	Following station
Bellflower toward Slauson	Southeast Gateway Line Phase 1	Terminus

Former services (as Artesia)
Preceding station	Pacific Electric	Following station
Dolley toward Pacific Electric Building	Santa Ana	Thornton toward Santa Ana SP Depot
Location

Pioneer station is a planned light rail station in the Los Angeles Metro Rail system. It will be the southern terminus of the Southeast Gateway Line project, located in Artesia at Pioneer Boulevard. The segment of the corridor is expected to begin operations in 2035. The route may later on be further expanded along the West Santa Ana right-of-way, but Metro has not yet announced any plans to do so.

The station is located adjacent to the former Pacific Electric West Santa Ana Branch Artesia station, built in 1906. Passenger services operated until 1950.

== Connections ==
Metro route 62 passes nearby the station at 183rd / Pioneer. Norwalk Transit line 2 also services the same stop. Norwalk Transit also provides buses which connect to the Norwalk/Santa Fe Springs Metrolink station.
