= La Habra–Yorba Linda Line =

Pacific Electric interurban route in California

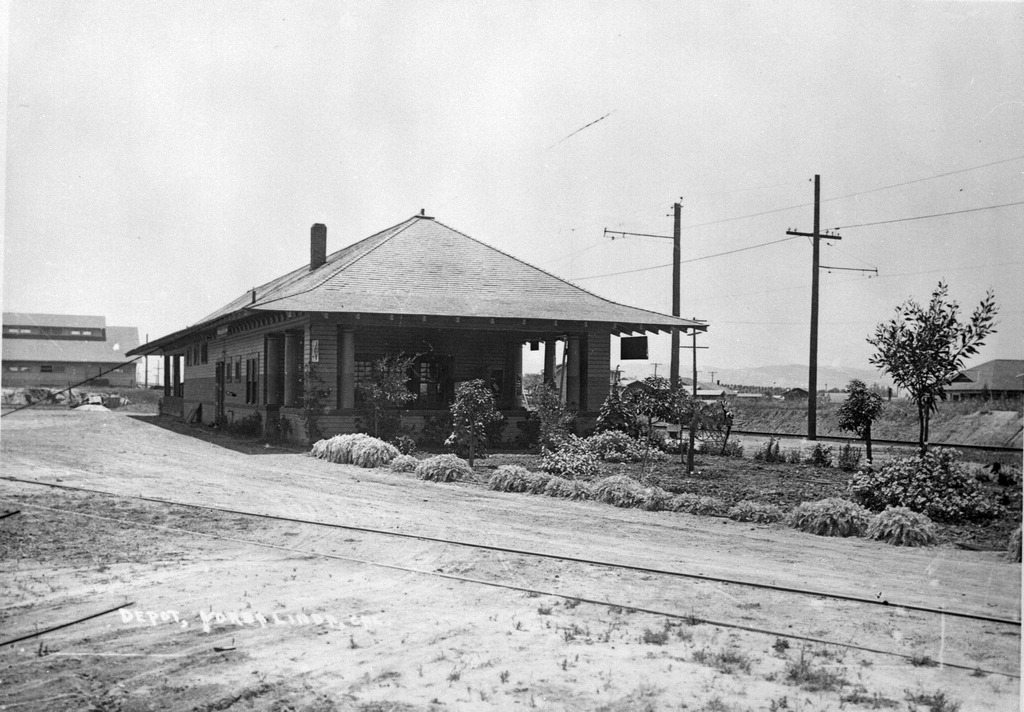
- Yorba Linda Depot, 1912

Overview
- Owner: Southern Pacific Railroad
- Locale: Los Angeles, the Gateway Cities and Orange County
- Termini: Downtown Los Angeles; Yorba Linda, California
- Stations: 34

Service
- Type: Interurban
- System: Pacific Electric
- Operator: Pacific Electric
- Rolling stock: PE 220 Class (last used)
- Ridership: 100,105 (1926)

History
- Opened: November 12, 1911 (to Stern)
- Closed: January 22, 1938

Technical
- Track gauge: 1,435 mm (4 ft 8 1/2 in) standard gauge
- Electrification: Overhead line, 600 V DC

La Habra–Yorba Linda Line was a Pacific Electric interurban line which traveled between Los Angeles and Yorba Linda. Passenger services ran between 1911 and 1938. Initial plans were for the route to continue further east to form a second main line between Los Angeles and San Bernardino, though these would go unfulfilled. After passenger service ended, much of the route was retained for freight service, eventually becoming the Union Pacific La Habra Subdivision.

== History ==
Construction on the line began under the Los Angeles Inter-Urban Electric Railway between 1906 and 1908 with Pacific Electric assuming control and completing the line between 1909 and 1911. The route was not originally intended to start passenger service until a connection to Corona was complete. Despite that, the line opened as a branch of the Whittier Line by 1911 with service reaching Stern on November 12. Service beyond Yorba Linda was abandoned after August 1, 1930. The route ceased service after January 22, 1938, due to low ridership.

The rails through Yorba Linda were removed in 1951, though much of the route remains in service for freight trains. The line between Slauson and Los Nietos forms the Union Pacific La Habra Subdivision, and the segment east of there is an industrial spur which continues as far as Brea. A portion of the line in Brea was converted to a trail, The Tracks at Brea. The Southeast Gateway Line light rail project is expected to use a section of the line between Slauson and the former Los Angeles and Salt Lake Railroad right of way.

== Route ==
The La Habra–Yorba Linda Line followed the Long Beach Line from Los Angeles south to Slauson Junction (south of Slauson Boulevard) where it branched off in an easterly direction to Whittier and Yorba Linda. From there, the double track line ran easterly, in private way between dual roadways of Randolph Street, through Huntington Park, Vernon, Bell, and Maywood to reach the Los Angeles River. Crossing the river, the double track in private way followed intermittent sections of Randolph Street through Bell Gardens and Commerce, and crossed the Rio Hondo south of Slauson Avenue.

The line continued easterly, south and parallel to, Slauson Avenue. Across the Pico Rivera area and the San Gabriel River into Los Nietos, where the line crossed the Atchison, Topeka and Santa Fe Railway Third District main line (Los Nietos) at Norwalk Boulevard. The single track La Habra–Yorba Linda Line branched easterly in private way off the Whittier Line at Los Nietos, crossed Norwalk Boulevard and went through Whittier at the south edge of the city limits. After crossing Mills Avenue the track ran adjacent to and north of Lambert Road until crossing 1st Street. Here the line turned easterly through La Habra to Laon Junction (3rd Avenue at College Street), where the single track Fullerton Line branched to the south.

After crossing Harbor Boulevard the line turned southeasterly still in private way crossed Puente Avenue in Brea, then turned easterly to run through Brea north of the Imperial Highway. The line then turned southeasterly (where the Orange Freeway now crosses over the track) and crossed the Imperial Highway west of Valencia Avenue and ran through Yorba Linda just south of and parallel to Imperial Highway to the terminus at Yorba Linda Boulevard. Prior to 1930, the line continued further southeast to an area known as Stern, located near the present interchange of Imperial Highway and Kellogg Drive.

=== Unbuilt connection to Corona ===
Henry E. Huntington, owner of the Pacific Electric, intended to connect the Whittier Line to the Arlington–Corona Line via Stern and the Santa Ana Canyon. After the Great Merger of 1911, surveys were carried out to establish two routes through the canyon — one on each side of the Santa Ana River.

== List of major stations ==
Station	Mile	Major connections	Date opened	Date closed	City
Pacific Electric Building	0	Alhambra–San Gabriel, Annandale, Balboa, Fullerton, Hawthorne–El Segundo, Long Beach, Monrovia–Glendora, Mount Lowe, Pasadena Short Line, Pasadena via Oak Knoll, Pomona, Redlands, Redondo Beach via Gardena, Riverside–Rialto, San Pedro via Dominguez, San Pedro via Gardena, Santa Ana, Santa Monica Air Line, Sierra Madre, Soldiers' Home, South Pasadena Local, Upland–San Bernardino, Whittier; Los Angeles Railway B, H, J, R, 7, and 8	1905	1961	Los Angeles
Amoco		Balboa, Fullerton, Hawthorne–El Segundo, Long Beach, Redondo Beach via Gardena, San Pedro via Dominguez, San Pedro via Gardena, Santa Ana, Santa Monica Air Line, Soldiers' Home, Whittier	1902	1961	Los Angeles
Slauson Junction	4.27	Balboa, Fullerton, Hawthorne–El Segundo, Long Beach, Redondo Beach via Gardena, San Pedro via Dominguez, San Pedro via Gardena, Santa Ana, Whittier	1902	1961	Los Angeles
Huntington Park	5.42	Fullerton, Whittier; Los Angeles Railway J		1938	
Baker	7.66	Fullerton, Whittier		1938	
Laguna	10.08	Fullerton, Whittier		1938	
Rio Hondo	11.40	Fullerton, Whittier		1938	
Rivera	12.39	Fullerton, Whittier		1938	
Los Nietos	14.50	Fullerton, Whittier	1903	1938	Santa Fe Springs
Leffingwell	19.39	Fullerton		1938	
Des Moines	20.92	Fullerton		1938	
La Habra	22.19	Fullerton	1911	1938	La Habra
Brea	25.00		1911	1938	
Oleo	26.00		1911	1938	
Loftus	27.20		1911	1938	
Yorba Linda	30.63		1911	1938	
Stern	32.08		1911	1930	
