= Long Beach Line =

Pacific Electric interurban route in California

Long Beach
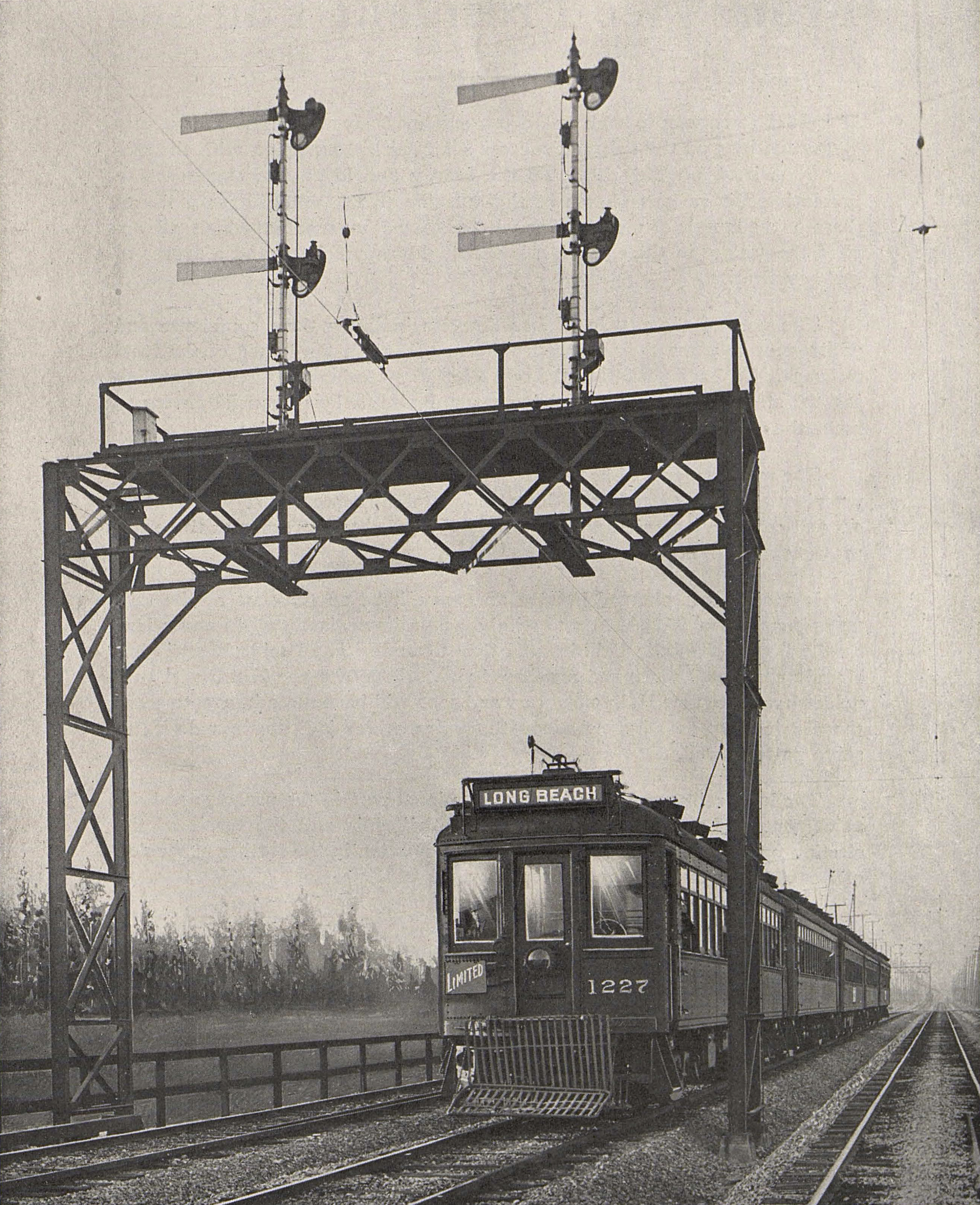
- A train en route to Long Beach, 1923

Overview
- Locale: Los Angeles, and Long Beach
- Termini: Downtown Los Angeles; Downtown Long Beach, California
- Stations: 8

Service
- Type: Interurban
- Operator(s): Pacific Electric (1902–1958); LAMTA (1958–1961)
- Rolling stock: PE 1200 Class (last used)
- Ridership: 1,603,476 (1958)

History
- Opened: July 4, 1902
- Closed: April 9, 1961

Technical
- Line length: 20.37 mi (32.78 km)
- Number of tracks: 1–4
- Track gauge: 1,435 mm (4 ft 8 1/2 in) standard gauge
- Electrification: Overhead line, 600 V DC

The Long Beach Line was a major interurban railway operated by the Pacific Electric Railway between Los Angeles and Long Beach, California via Florence, Watts, and Compton. Service began in 1902 and lasted until 1961, the last line of the system to be replaced by buses.

In addition to the Long Beach service, the line served as a trunk for a number of other interurban lines stretching to Whittier, Yorba Linda, Fullerton, Santa Ana, Balboa, San Pedro, and Redondo Beach. It was four tracks wide north of the junction at Watts, with local service on the outer tracks and long-distance trains bypassing the local stations on the inner tracks.

After the end of Pacific Electric service, Southern Pacific continued to operate freight trains on the tracks, and its successor Union Pacific still does between Amoco and Dominguez Junction. Passenger service to the corridor returned in 1990 with the opening of the Blue Line, a modern light rail service using portions of the former right-of-way. When the Regional Connector subway tunnel was completed in 2023, the Blue Line, renamed as the A Line in 2019, was extended northeast to Azusa, becoming the world's longest light rail route.

== Route ==
The line originated at the 6th and Main street station in Los Angeles and exited to the east via an elevated structure over downtown streets to reach San Pedro street at grade. The dual track line went south in the center lanes of the streets. The line then turned east on Olympic Boulevard (East 9th Street) street running to Hooper Street, then turned south and entered the private right of way west of Long Beach Avenue. Two additional tracks joined in the private way from Pacific Electric's 8th Street Yard. This was the start of the four track system to Watts.

The line was within a private right of way from Olympic Boulevard to Willow Street in Long Beach. The four track system went to Watts Junction (103rd street). The remainder of the line was double tracked to Ocean Avenue in Long Beach.

The four track line went south from Olympic Boulevard crossing Washington Boulevard where Long Beach Avenue becomes twin roadways on both side of the rail line.

At Amoco Junction (25th Street), the Santa Monica Air Line branched off to the west and a connection to the Butte Street Freight Yard (Southern Pacific J Yard) went to the east. Continuing to the south, the line crossed the Atchison, Topeka and Santa Fe Railway Harbor District tracks at Slauson Boulevard at grade. The Whittier Line branched to the east at Slauson Junction just south of Slauson Boulevard. A four track steel plate girder bridge carried the track over Firestone Boulevard where the Braham Freight Yard paralleled the line to 91st street.

At Watts Junction (103rd Street) the four track system ended. Here the Santa Ana Line branched to the east and the Redondo Beach via Gardena Line, Torrance Line, and Hawthorne–El Segundo Line branched to the west.

The Long Beach Line (on dual tracks) turned southeasterly from Watts Junction and ran towards Compton between the twin roadways of Willowbrook Avenue. Crossing Rosecrans Boulevard, the line turned to the south. Reaching Greenleaf Boulevard, Willowbrook Boulevard ended and the line proceeded to the south crossing over Compton Creek on a two-track steel Pratt truss bridge. The line then turned southeasterly towards Signal Hill.

At Dominguez Junction the San Pedro via Dominguez Line branched to the south on the west side of Alameda Street. The Long Beach Line crossed Alameda Street and the Southern Pacific San Pedro Branch at grade, and followed the west bank of Compton Creek towards the Los Angeles River.

After the construction of the Long Beach Freeway, the line crossed over the freeway on a two track plate girder bridge then crossed the Union Pacific San Pedro Branch (Cota crossing) at grade. A long single track deck girder bridge carried the line over the Los Angeles River towards Willow Street (North Long Beach). This was the only single track section on the line.

At Willow Street (North Long Beach) the Balboa Line branched to the southeast and the Long Beach Line ran south in the center lane of American Avenue (Long Beach Boulevard) to Ocean Avenue in Long Beach. The line turned west onto Ocean Avenue and followed the same route as the American Avenue–North Long Beach Line to the terminus at the Pacific Electric station at the foot of Pacific Avenue.

== Operations ==
For a number of years, the PE operated express "flyer" service along the Long Beach route. The flyer service only made a few stops between Downtown Los Angeles and Long Beach, as compared with regular service that made all stops between Watts and Willowville, and most stops between Willowville and Long Beach. The right-of-way was also served by a pair of local lines: the Watts Line between Downtown Los Angeles and Watts, and the American Avenue–North Long Beach Line between Willowville and Long Beach.

=== Southern Pacific Depot–Long Beach–Wilmington ===
Pacific Electric also provided service along the route to connect to long-distance passenger trains at Southern Pacific's Central Station. Cars ran from the downtown station to Long Beach and continued to San Pedro. It operated from 1924 to 1939 when Union Station opened and consolidated intercity trains at a different location.

== History ==
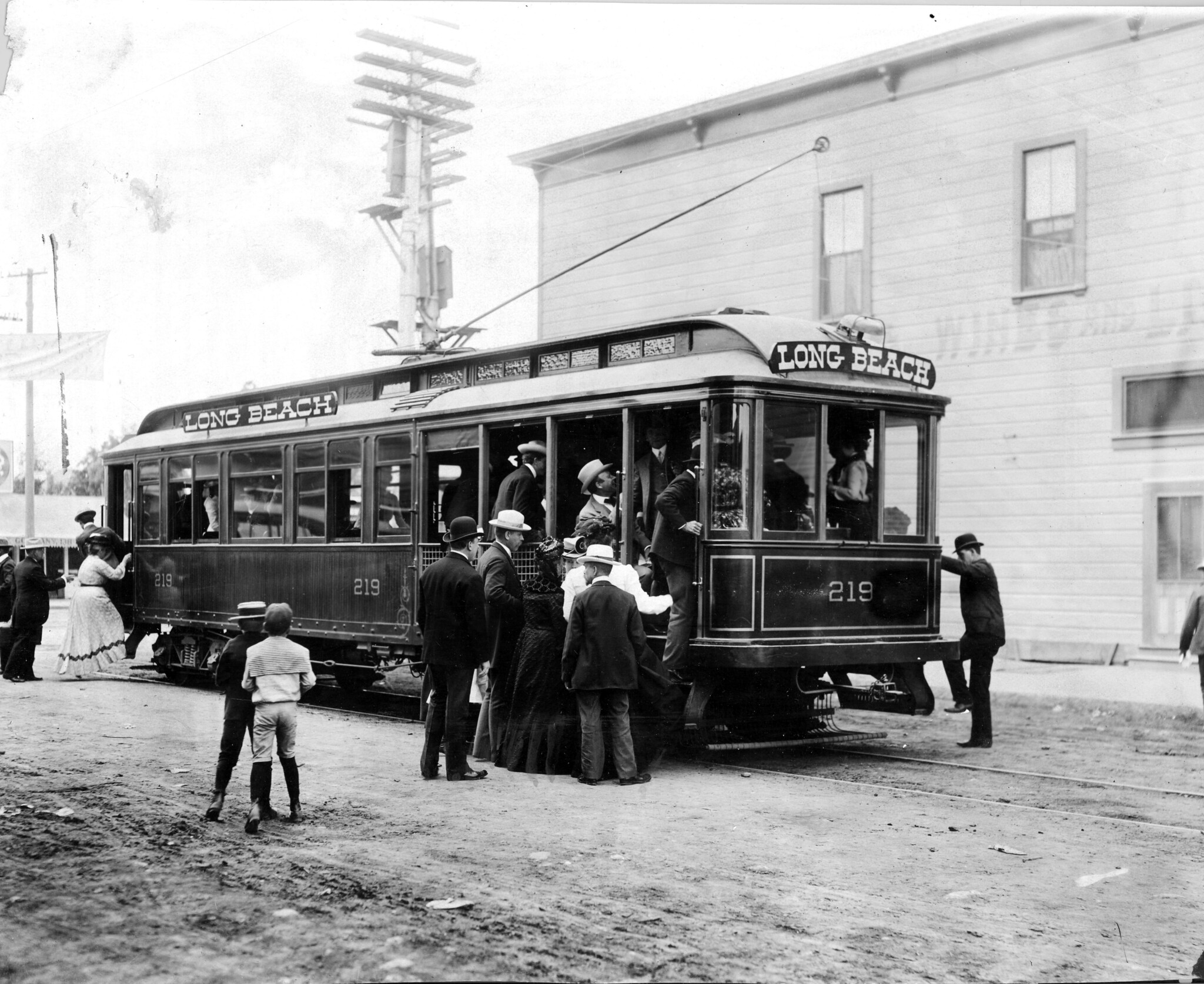
The first day of service in Long Beach, 1902

Conceiving of the line earlier in the summer, Henry E. Huntington incorporated the Pacific Electric Railway in November 1901 and immediately began work on the Long Beach Line. Service began on July 4, 1902 (with a trial car run over the line the previous day), initially beginning at 9th and Main Streets in downtown Los Angeles (the trackage on 9th Street was acquired from Huntington's Los Angeles Railway in 1904). The terminal was moved to the Pacific Electric Building in 1905, and trains were rerouted over the newly built elevated trackage west of San Pedro Street in 1917. The service was designated line 6.

Skip-stop limited trains were eliminated between February and November 1944. Postwar ridership initially kept strong, but service cuts began as early as 1946.

The Long Beach Line was transferred to Metropolitan Coach Lines in 1953. The service was further was commuted to the Los Angeles Metropolitan Transit Authority on March 3, 1958; on April 17 it was renumbered to line 36.

Passenger service ended on April 9, 1961, the last of the former Pacific Electric lines to do so. Trains were replaced by the 36 "Long Beach Freeway Flyer" bus, which followed the new Long Beach Freeway north of the Long Beach Boulevard interchange. Local replacement service north of this point was provided by the 33 "Los Angeles–Compton–Wilmington", which had replaced San Pedro via Dominguez Line trains in 1958. A documentary Ride the Last of the Big Red Cars by Interurban Films captured the last week of operations of the Long Beach Line.

Southern Pacific continued to operate freight trains over the line. Their successor, Union Pacific, operates the remainder of the tracks as the Wilmington Subdivision.

A Southern Pacific depot of Mission Revival design was built at Broadway and Pacific Avenue in downtown Long Beach in 1907. It was moved to a nearby Long Beach city maintenance yard alongside the Los Angeles River in 1936, and then moved again in 2015. It was destroyed by a fire in 2016.

=== Restoration ===
An early goal of the Los Angeles County Transportation Commission was to reestablish rail service over the former PE right of way. Modern light rail was chosen as the preferred mode, and the line was largely rebuilt to accommodate the service. The Blue Line (later renamed to the A Line) opened in 1990 as the first of a new rail system in Los Angeles.

== Station list ==
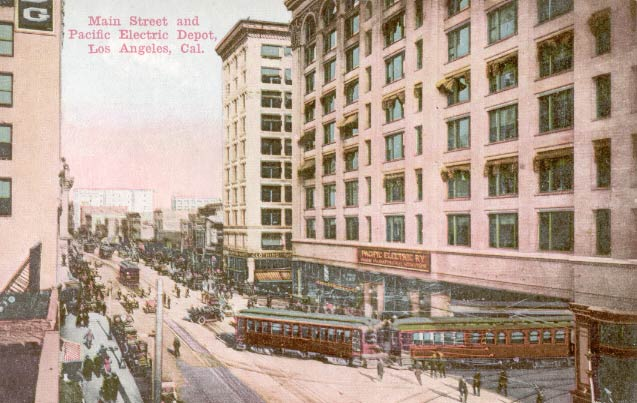
Pacific Electric Building

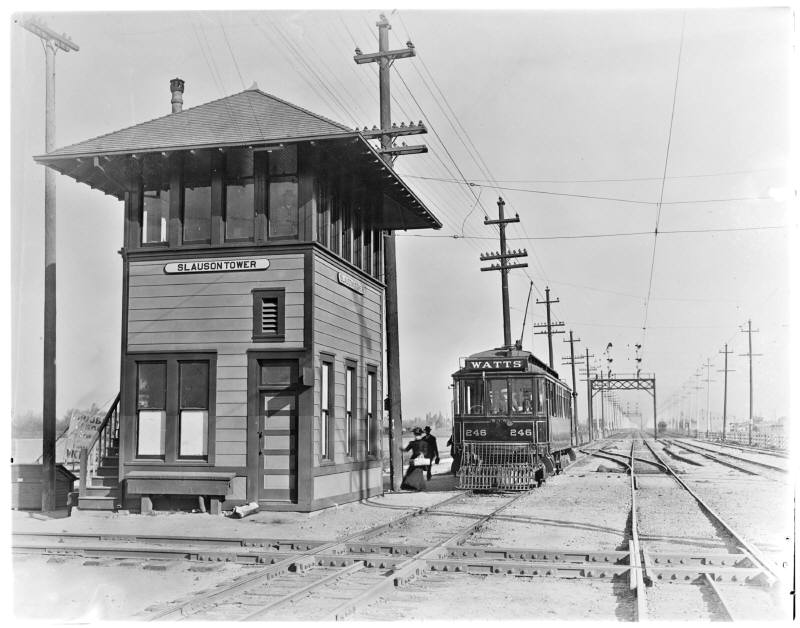
Slauson Junction

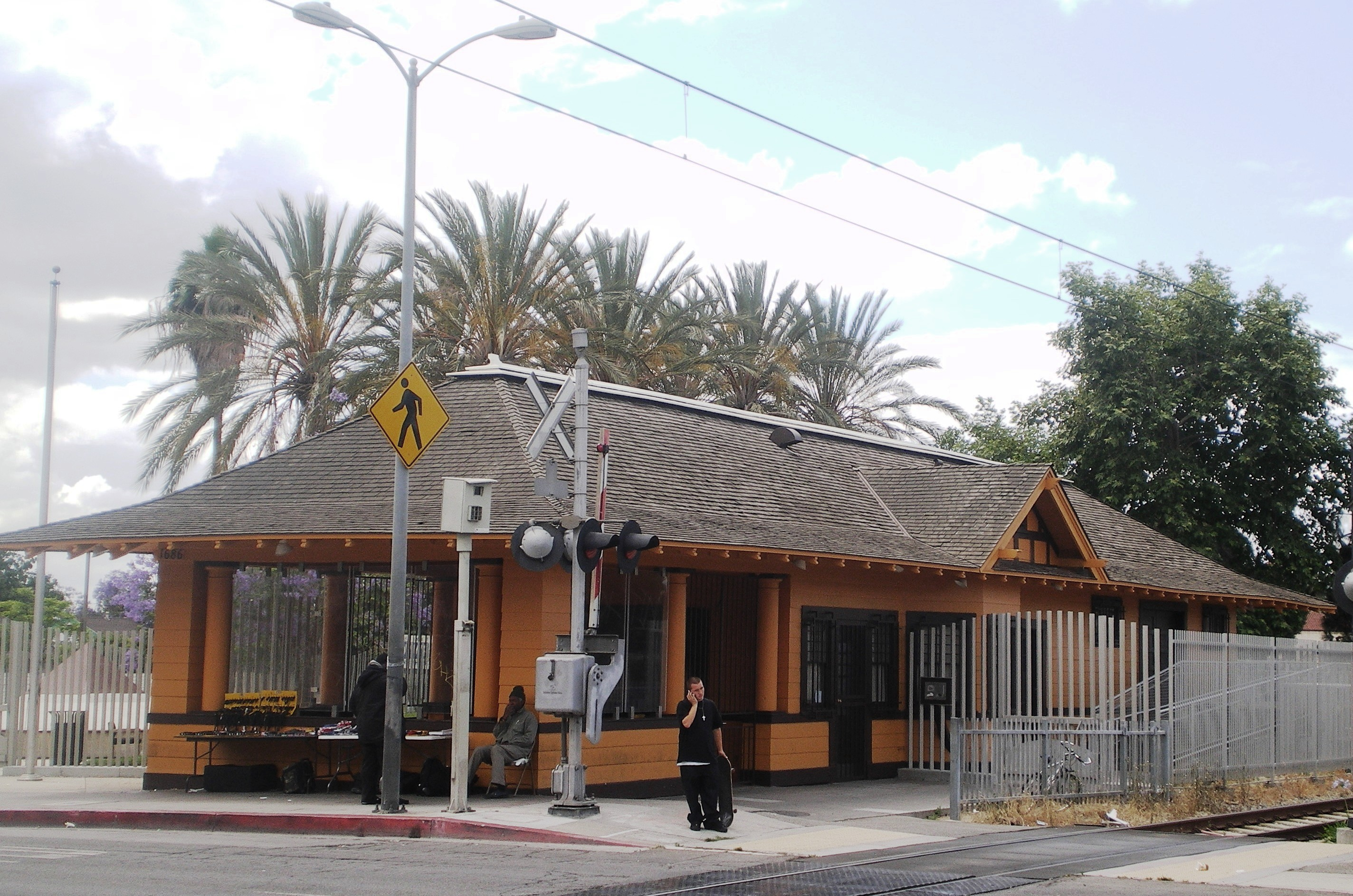
Watts Station, 2008

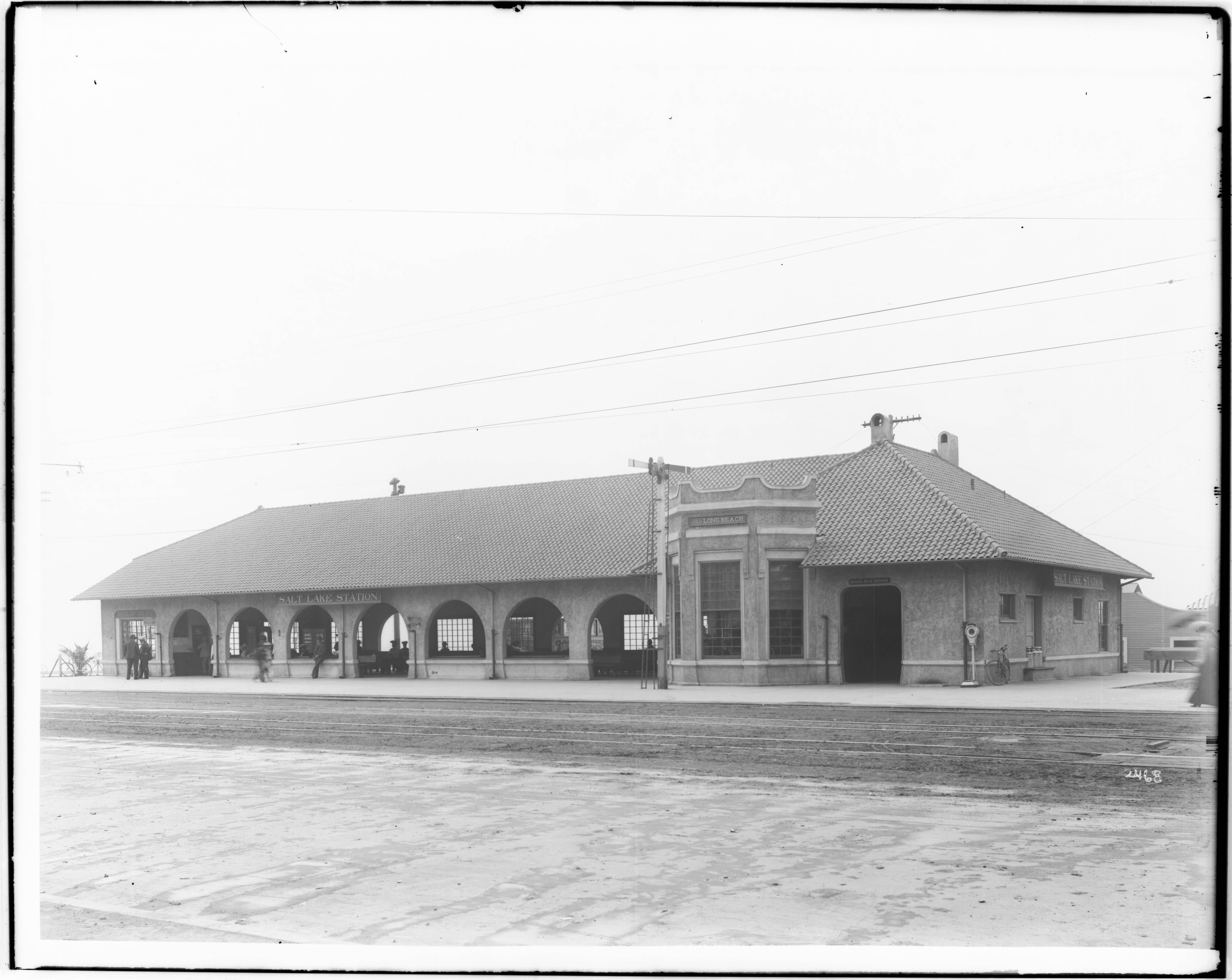
Long Beach Station

City	Station	Mile	Service began	Service ended	Major connections
Los Angeles	Pacific Electric Building	0	1905	1961	Interchange with Alhambra–San Gabriel, Annandale, Balboa, Fullerton, Hawthorne-El Segundo, La Habra–Fullerton–Yorba Linda, Monrovia–Glendora, Mount Lowe, Pasadena Short Line, Pasadena via Oak Knoll, Pomona, Riverside–Rialto, San Pedro via Dominguez, San Pedro via Gardena, Santa Ana, Santa Monica Air Line, Sierra Madre, Soldiers' Home, South Pasadena Local, Whittier
Los Angeles	Vernon Avenue	3.26			Balboa, Fullerton, Hawthorne–El Segundo, La Habra–Yorba Linda, Redondo Beach via Gardena, San Pedro via Dominguez, San Pedro via Gardena, Santa Ana, Whittier; Los Angeles Railway V
	Slauson Junction	4.27	1902	1961	Balboa, Fullerton, Hawthorne–El Segundo, La Habra–Yorba Linda, Redondo Beach via Gardena, San Pedro via Dominguez, San Pedro via Gardena, Santa Ana, Whittier
	Fleming				
	Florencito Park				
	Florence Avenue				
	Nadeau				
	Graham				
Los Angeles	Latin				
Los Angeles	Watts	7.45	1902	1961	Balboa, Hawthorne–El Segundo, Redondo Beach via Gardena, San Pedro via Dominguez, San Pedro via Gardena, Santa Ana, Watts Line
Los Angeles	Abila				
	Springdale				
	Willowbrook	9.39			
	Sativa				
Compton	Winona				
Compton	Compton	10.92	1902	1961	Balboa, San Pedro via Dominguez
	Dominguez				
	Dominguez Junction	13.31		1961	Balboa, San Pedro via Dominguez
Carson	Del Amo				
Long Beach	Cota	16.04			
Long Beach	Los Cerritos				
Long Beach	Vista del Mar				
Long Beach	Willowville	17.52	1902	1961	Balboa
Long Beach	Long Beach	20.37	1902	1961	Long Beach–San Pedro

== Rolling stock ==
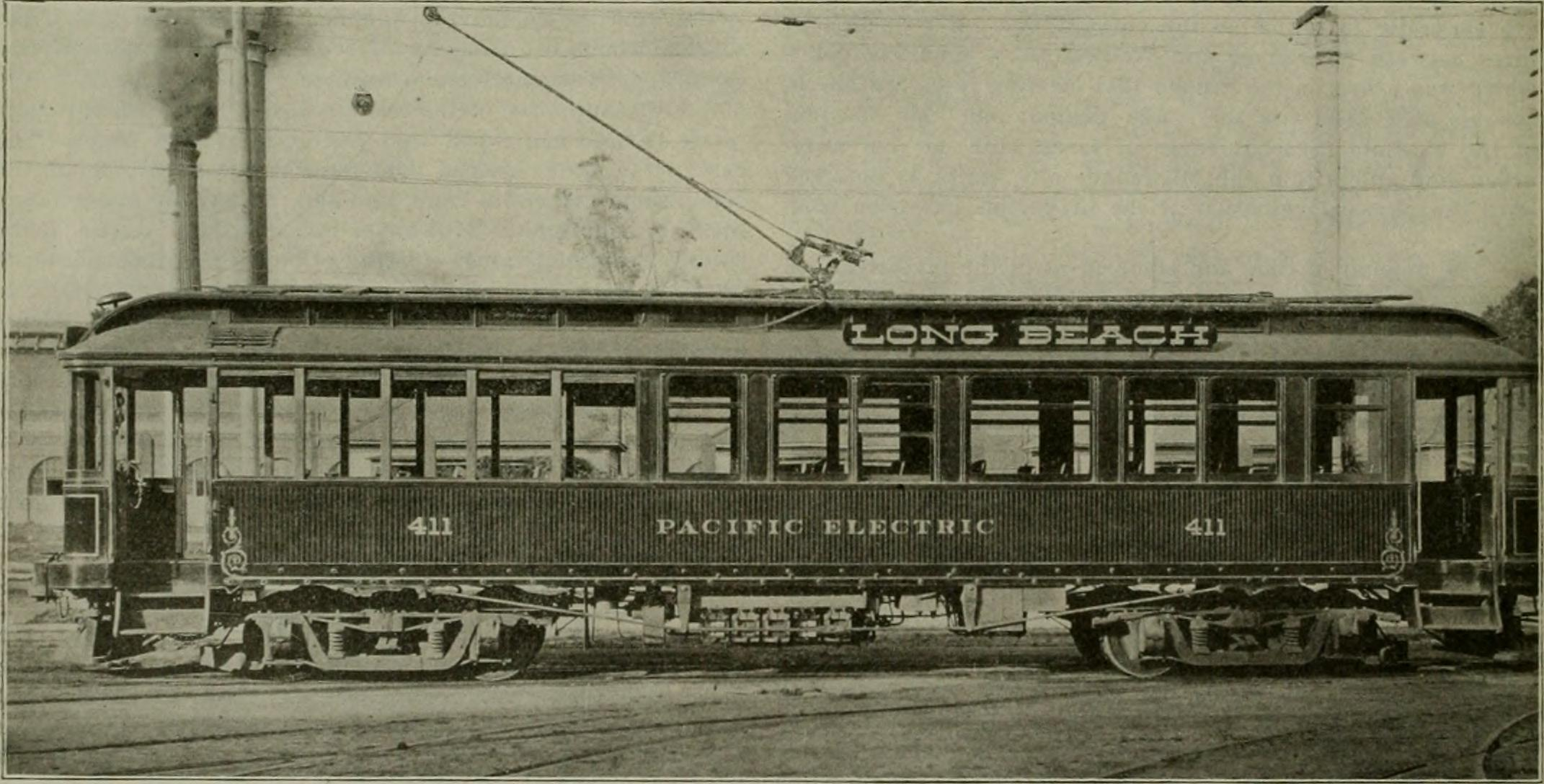
Pacific Electric Rolling Stock—Standard Passenger Coach, 1906

Service in 1902 commenced with 200 class cars. These were originally built for narrow gauge operation, but were refit for running on standard gauge. The motors on these cars proved to be underpowered, and were quickly replaced with 250 class the following year. The 250 class cars were fitted with couplers in 1907, allowing multiple operation. By 1924 the line was utilizing 1200 class rolling stock.
