= Long Beach–San Pedro Line =

Pacific Electric line in California, U.S.

Long Beach–San Pedro

Overview
- Owner: Pacific Electric
- Line number: 9
- Locale: Los Angeles County, California
- Termini: Long Beach; San Pedro

Service
- Type: Interurban
- System: Pacific Electric
- Operator: Pacific Electric

History
- Opened: June 25, 1910
- Closed: January 2, 1949

Technical
- Line length: 7.82 mi (12.59 km)
- Track gauge: 1,435 mm (4 ft 8 1/2 in) standard gauge
- Electrification: Overhead line, 600 V DC

The Long Beach–San Pedro Line is a former Pacific Electric interurban railway service in Los Angeles County, California. Unlike most of the company's services, trains did not travel to Downtown Los Angeles and instead provided a service between Long Beach and San Pedro. It was designated as line 9.

== History ==
Direct service between Long Beach and San Pedro commenced on June 25, 1910. In 1917 the line was rerouted in Long Beach via Third Street, Pine Avenue, Ocean Avenue, Morgan, a private right-of-way, and a reverse move to Wilmington. Further rerouting in 1921 had the line crossing the Los Angeles River on Seventh Street after the river's new cement channel was constructed. Service was again rerouted starting February 15, 1942, this time to avoid the bascule bridge which was closed due to World War II. Passenger operations ceased after January 2, 1949.

== Route ==
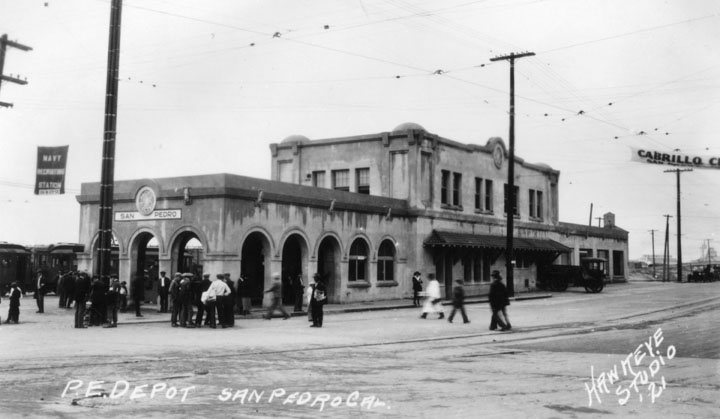
San Pedro station, 1921

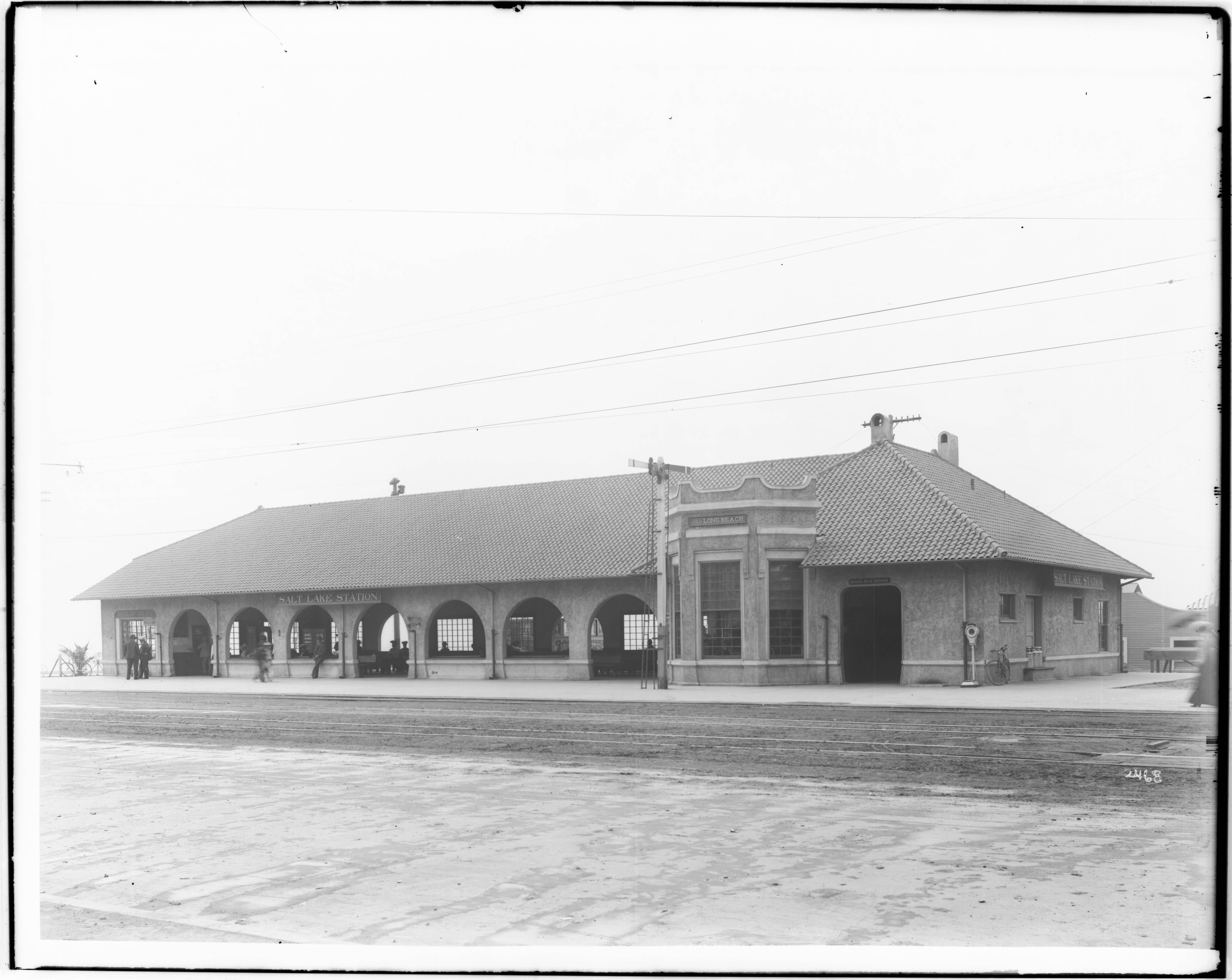
Long Beach station

After departing Long Beach via the Seventh Street Bridge (since demolished), the line turned north, running on the west bank of the Los Angeles River before turning westward just south of Anaheim Street. The tracks crossed Anaheim Street obliquely and continued west before crossing two Southern Pacific steam lines before joining the San Pedro via Dominguez Line.

A spur line ran up Daisy Avenue, usually only served by a single passenger round trip to maintain the franchise.

=== List of major stations ===
Station	Mile	Major connections	Date opened	Date closed	City
Long Beach	0	Long Beach, Long Beach Local Lines			Long Beach
East Wilmington	4.00				Wilmington
Wilmington	5.20	San Pedro via Dominguez			Wilmington
San Pedro	7.82	San Pedro via Dominguez, San Pedro via Gardena, San Pedro Local Lines			San Pedro
