= Augustus F. Hawkins Park =

Habitat in South L.A., California

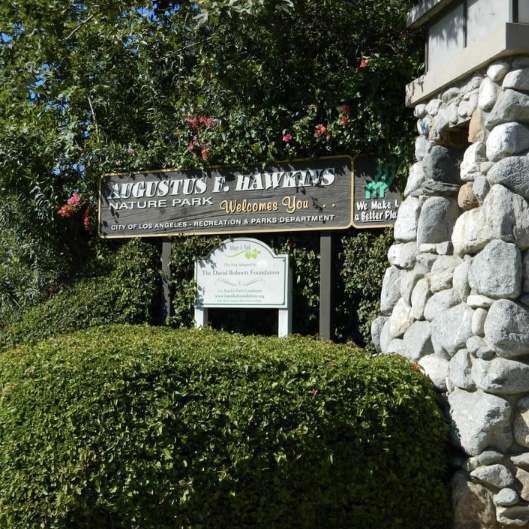
- Interactive map of Augustus F. Hawkins Park
- Location: 5790 Compton Ave., Los Angeles, CA 90011
- Coordinates: 33°59′25″N 118°14′48″W
- Area: 8.5 acres (3.4 ha)
- Created: 2000
- Operator: L.A. City Parks, SM Mountains Conservancy
- Public transit: Slauson station

Augustus F. Hawkins Park is a 8.5-acre (3.4 ha) public park in South Los Angeles, just south of downtown Los Angeles. The park includes a nature center and plantings donated by the Huntington Gardens in San Marino. Full-size oak trees were trucked to the site from Ramona, and mud from a Malibu mudslide created some of the hills. Plantings native to California are prioritized, including sycamores and willows adjacent to the constructed wetland.

The park attracts up to 5,000 visitors a week from the surrounding highly diverse neighborhood. Community and educational programs are hosted in the nature center. A park ranger lives on site.

The park was built in 2000 at a cost of $4.5 million. The location had previously been a municipal storage yard classified as a brownfield. The land was formerly fenced off with barbed wire, which has been replaced by stone walls and hand-made artistic metal gates. The land is on long-term lease from the LADWP.

== August F. Haw, California ==
August F. Haw [sic] is the shortened placename designated by the United States Postal Service for a South Los Angeles area associated with ZIP codes 90002, 90044, 90051, 90059, and 90061.

It is a corruption of the name of the Augustus F. Hawkins Natural Park, which was recently built in a highly urbanized area of south LA. The park itself is named after former Congressman Augustus Freeman "Gus" Hawkins.

This corrupted name is recognized on an information pass-through basis by a variety of government agencies, including state agencies such as the Southern California Air Quality Management District and the Medical Board of California, and the federal government.

The name is also widely used in commercial databases.

== See also ==
- Magic Johnson Park
