= Slauson station (A Line) =

Light rail station in Los Angeles, California

Slauson
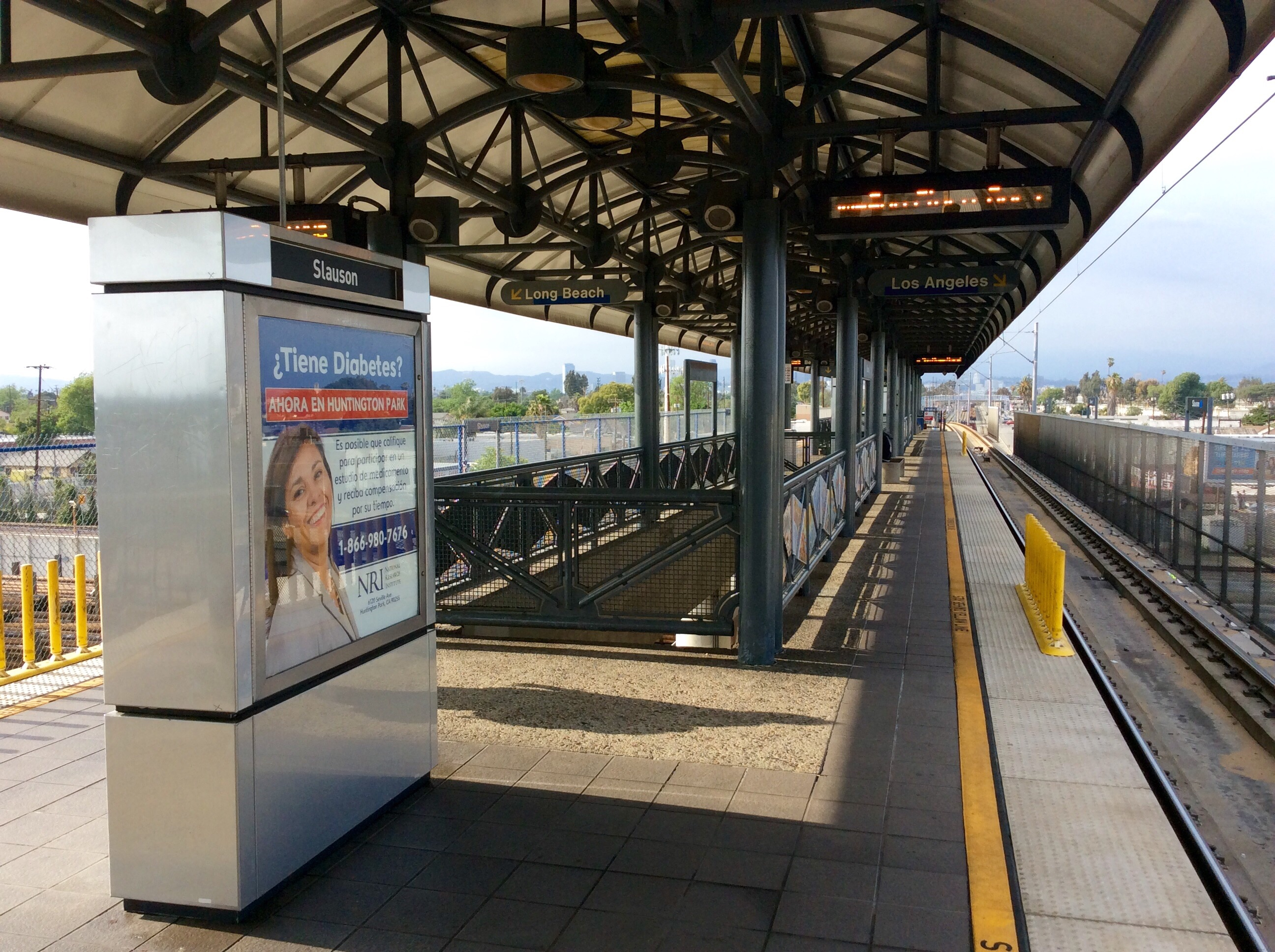
- Slauson station platform

General information
- Location: 1700 Slauson Avenue; Florence, California
- Coordinates: 33.9881°N 118.2433°W
- Owner: Los Angeles County Metropolitan Transportation Authority
- Platforms: 1 island platform
- Tracks: 2
- Connections: Los Angeles Metro Bus; LADOT DASH

Construction
- Structure type: Elevated
- Cycle facilities: Racks
- Accessible: Yes

History
- Opened: July 14, 1990; 36 years ago
- Rebuilt: November 2, 2019

Passengers
- FY 2026: 1,310 (avg. wkdy boardings)

Services
Preceding station	Metro Rail	Following station
Florence toward Long Beach	A Line	Vernon toward Pomona
Former services (as Slauson Junction)
Preceding station	Pacific Electric	Following station
Fleming toward Morgan Avenue	Long Beach	Vernon toward Pacific Electric Building
Fleming toward Balboa	Balboa	Vernon toward Pacific Electric Building
Fleming toward San Pedro	San Pedro via Dominguez	Vernon toward Pacific Electric Building
Fleming toward San Pedro	San Pedro via Gardena	Vernon toward Pacific Electric Building
Fleming toward Santa Ana SP Depot	Santa Ana	Vernon toward Pacific Electric Building
Fleming toward Clifton	Redondo Beach via Gardena	Vernon toward Pacific Electric Building
Fleming toward El Segundo	Hawthorne–El Segundo	Vernon toward Pacific Electric Building
Dozier toward Santa Ana SP Depot	Whittier	Vernon toward Pacific Electric Building
Dozier toward Fullerton	Fullerton	Vernon toward Pacific Electric Building
Dozier toward Yorba Linda	La Habra–Yorba Linda	Vernon toward Pacific Electric Building
Fleming toward Watts	Watts; Local	Slauson Avenue toward Pacific Electric Building
Location

Slauson station is an elevated light rail station on the A Line of the Los Angeles Metro Rail system. The station is located within the historic right-of-way of the Pacific Electric Railway and elevated over the intersection of Slauson Avenue, after which the station is named, in the unincorporated Los Angeles County community of Florence.

The station is on a long viaduct that carries the A Line over the Union Pacific freight railroad's Wilmington Subdivision and its junction with the La Habra Subdivision.

A J Line station with an identical name is located approximately 2.1 miles (3.4 km) west of the station. Passengers may use Los Angeles Metro Bus route 108 to travel between the two stations. The line will serve as a transfer between the A Line and the Southeast Gateway Line, which will open in 2035 and eventually run from Los Angeles Union Station and the Gateway Cities located in southeastern Los Angeles County.

This station will be the eastern trailhead of the Rail to Rail bike path.

== History ==
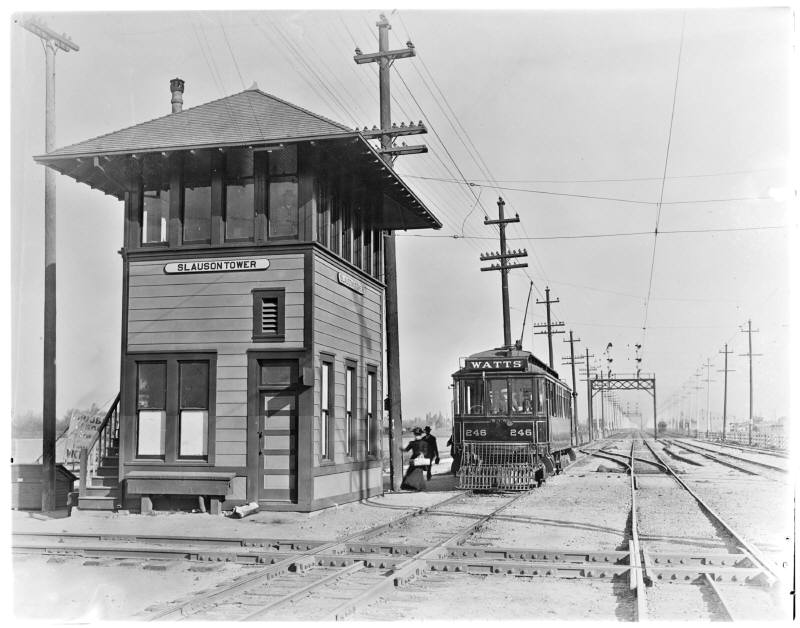
A Watts Line car at Slauson Junction, c. 1902

The Slauson station was built on the Pacific Electric Railway's Southern Division as a major switching point of for the cars of the Long Beach, Newport, Santa Ana, Whittier and San Pedro, as well as the Watts local. The Atchison, Topeka and Santa Fe Railway Redondo branch tracks also crossed the Pacific Electric tracks here, and the collection was commonly known as Slauson Junction. The 43-lever all-electric interlocking apparatus was the largest in California when it began operation in 1908.

The station is also planned to be served by the proposed light rail Southeast Gateway Line, with service starting in 2035.

== Service ==
=== Hours and frequency ===
A Line service hours are from approximately 4:30 a.m. and 11:45 p.m. daily. Trains operate every 8 minutes during peak hours, Monday to Friday. Trains run every 10 minutes, during midday on weekdays and weekends, from 9:00 a.m. to 7:00 p.m. Night and early morning service is approximately every 20 minutes every day.

=== Connections ===
As of December 15, 2024, the following connections are available:

- Los Angeles Metro Bus: 108
- LADOT DASH: Pueblo Del Rio

== Notable places nearby ==
The station is within walking distance of the following notable places:

- Augustus F. Hawkins Park
