= Yorba Linda station =

Historic California railway station

Yorba Linda
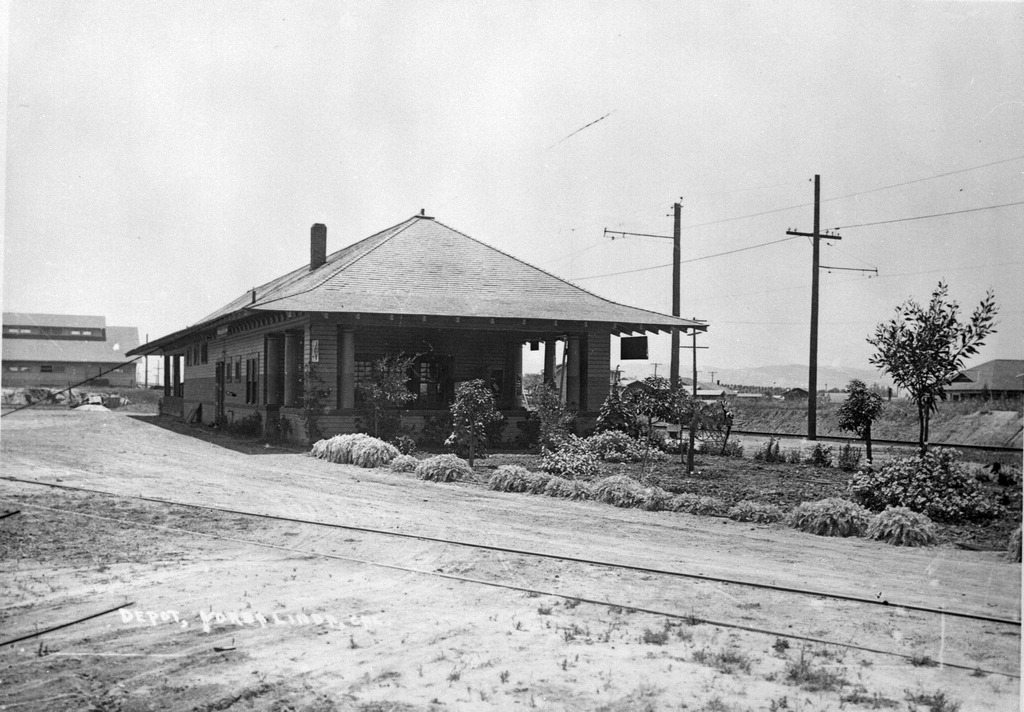
- The station building in 1912, shortly after opening

General information
- Location: 18132 Imperial Hwy. Yorba Linda, California
- Owner: Pacific Electric Railway
- Line: PE La Habra–Fullerton–Yorba Linda Line

History
- Opened: 1910
- Closed: January 22, 1938
- Rebuilt: 1911

Former services
Preceding station	Pacific Electric	Following station
Casa Loma toward Pacific Electric Building	La Habra–Yorba Linda	Terminus
Casa Loma toward Pacific Electric Building	La Habra–Yorba Linda	Edmore (Before 1930) toward Stern
- Pacific Electric Railway Company Depot
- U.S. National Register of Historic Places
- Location within the Los Angeles metropolitan area Location within California Location within the United States
- Coordinates: 33°53′28″N 117°48′58″W
- Built: 1911
- Architect: Pacific Electric Railway
- NRHP reference No.: 79000517
- Added to NRHP: October 25, 1979
Location

The Yorba Linda Depot is a former railway station of the Pacific Electric Railway, located in Yorba Linda, California. The station was in service for the La Habra–Fullerton–Yorba Linda Line, with rail service beginning in 1910 when tracks were extended through the town as far southeast as Stern. Passenger service beyond Yorba Linda was discontinued after August 1, 1930, and rail operations ended entirely on January 22, 1938.

After closing as a railway depot, the building was a nursery, a lumber yard office, a real estate office, and a restaurant. The station building was added to the National Register of Historic Places on October 25, 1979. Polly's restaurant opened in the building in 1992.
