= Whittier Line =

Pacific Electric interurban route in California

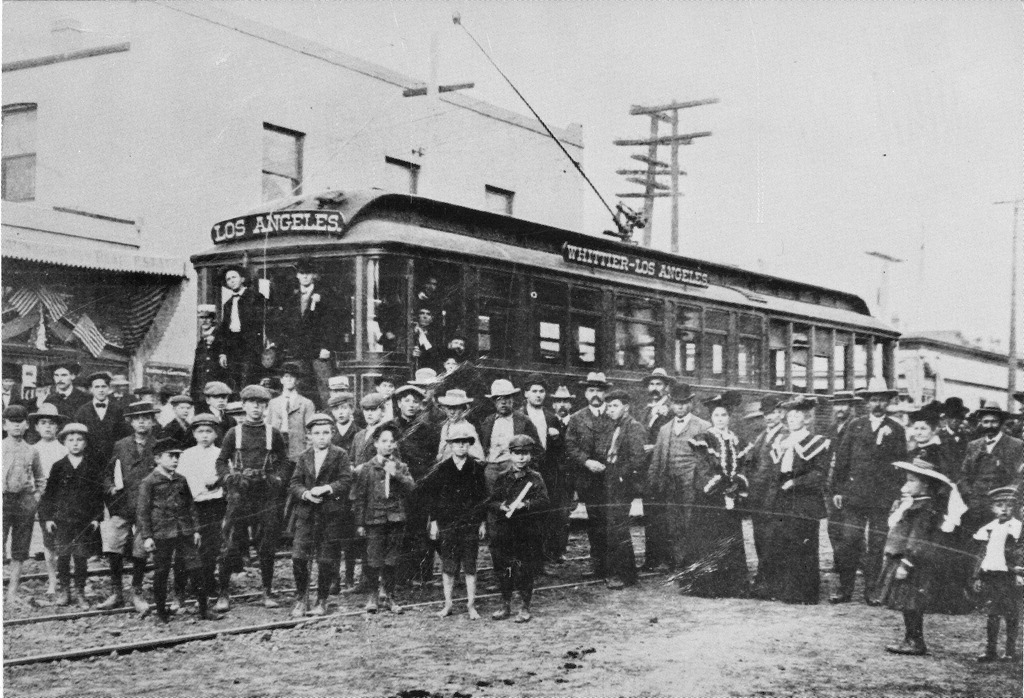
- The first Pacific Electric Car to Whittier, 1904

Overview
- Owner: Southern Pacific Railroad
- Locale: Southern California
- Termini: Pacific Electric Building; Whittier, California

Service
- Type: Interurban
- System: Pacific Electric
- Operator(s): Pacific Electric
- Ridership: 1,139,480 (peak, 1923)

History
- Opened: November 7, 1903
- Closed: January 22, 1938 (to Whittier); March 6, 1938 (to Walker)

Technical
- Line length: 17.35 mi (27.92 km)
- Track gauge: 1,435 mm (4 ft 8 1/2 in) standard gauge
- Electrification: Overhead line, 600 V DC

The Whittier Line was a Pacific Electric interurban line which traveled between Los Angeles and Whittier via Huntington Park, Rivera, and Los Nietos. A branch of the company's original Long Beach Line, operations along the line began in 1903. Due to its indirect route, passenger operations were eventually replaced by bus service on Whittier Boulevard after 1938. Tracks were largely retained for use by freight trains, eventually becoming the Union Pacific La Habra Subdivision. A short segment of the route is expected to be reactivated for passenger service as part of the Southeast Gateway Line.

== History ==
Construction of the route between Whittier and the Long Beach Line began in March 1902. The single track line opened to Whittier in November 1903. The route was graded wide enough to lay a second set of tracks in the future. Operations were undertaken by the Los Angeles Inter-Urban Electric Railway in 1904 and they had double tracked the line by September 1904. Southern Pacific assumed operation in 1908, and it was acquired by the new Southern Pacific in the 1911 Great Merger.

By September 1935, the number of departures was reduced to one round trip daily and service to Walker was regarded as its own local line. Whittier service was reduced to a single daily trip after September 1, 1935 and was totally discontinued on January 22, 1938. Walker service ceased March 6.

Much of the route remains in service for freight trains. The line between Slauson and Los Nietos forms the Union Pacific La Habra Subdivision. The Southeast Gateway Line light rail project is expected to use a section of the line between Slauson and the former Los Angeles and Salt Lake Railroad right of way.

== Route ==
The Whittier Line followed the Long Beach Line from Los Angeles south to Slauson Junction (south of Slauson Boulevard) where it branched off in an easterly direction to Whittier and Yorba Linda. From there, the double track Whittier Line ran easterly, in private way between dual roadways of Randolph Street, through Huntington Park, Vernon, Bell, and Maywood to reach the Los Angeles River. Crossing the river, the double track in private way followed intermittent sections of Randolph Street through Bell Gardens and Commerce, and crossed the Rio Hondo south of Slauson Avenue.

The line continued easterly, south and parallel to, Slauson Avenue. Across the Pico Rivera area and the San Gabriel River into Los Nietos, where the line crossed the Atchison, Topeka and Santa Fe Railway Third District main line (Los Nietos) at Norwalk Boulevard then turned northerly towards Whittier. The single track La Habra–Fullerton–Yorba Linda Line branched easterly in private way off the Whittier Line east of Norwalk Boulevard. The line in private way followed Allport Avenue and Lynalan Avenue then turned easterly crossing Whittier Boulevard into Philadelphia Street to the PE station at Comstock Avenue.

== Stations ==
Station	Mile	Time to LA
Pacific Electric Building	0.00	—
Vernon Avenue	3.26	0:10
Slauson Junction	4.27	0:15
Huntington Park	5.42	0:20
Bell (Maywood Ave.)	6.73	0:22
Bell (Gifford Ave)	7.20	0:23
Walker	8.65	0:28
Edgewater	9.20	
Laguna	10.28	0:31
Rio Hondo	11.40	0:33
Rivera	12.58	0:35
Los Nietos	14.50	0:39
State School	16.71	0:43
Whittier	17.35	0:47
