= Pacific Electric Building =

Historic building in Los Angeles, California

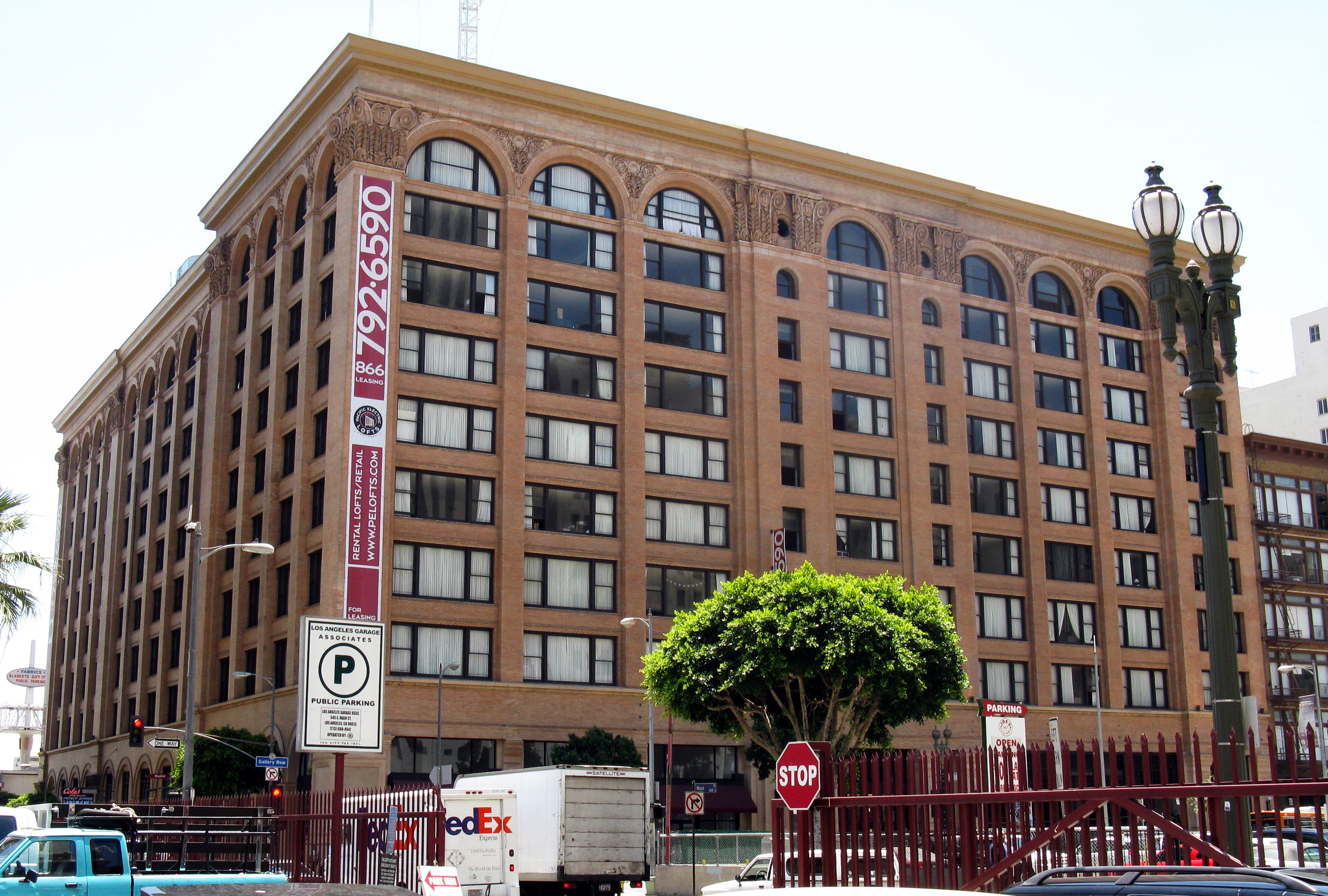
- Pacific Electric Building, 2009

General information
- Location: 610 S. Main Street; Los Angeles, California
- Operator: Pacific Electric (1905–1958) Los Angeles Metropolitan Transit Authority (1958–1961)
- Connections: Los Angeles Railway

History
- Opened: January 15, 1905
- Closed: April 9, 1961

Key dates
- 2005: converted to housing and retail
Former services
Preceding station	Pacific Electric	Following station
Vernon toward Morgan Avenue	Long Beach	Terminus
7th & Main toward Watts	Watts; Local	Terminus
Vernon toward San Pedro	San Pedro via Dominguez (discontinued 1958)	Terminus
Amoco toward Rustic Canyon	Air Line (1909–1953)	Terminus
Vernon toward Santa Ana SP Depot	Santa Ana	Terminus
Vernon toward Balboa	Balboa	Terminus
Vernon toward Clifton	Redondo Beach via Gardena (1911–1940)	Terminus
Vernon toward San Pedro	San Pedro via Gardena (discontinued 1940)	Terminus
Vernon toward Fullerton	Fullerton	Terminus
Vernon toward Yorba Linda	La Habra–Yorba Linda	Terminus
Beverly & Glendale toward Burbank or North Glendale	Glendale–Burbank (until 1925)	Terminus
Terminus	Pasadena Short Line (discontinued 1951)	Echandia toward Pasadena
Terminus	Pasadena via Oak Knoll (1906–1950)	Echandia toward Pasadena
Terminus	Monrovia–Glendora (discontinued 1951)	Echandia toward Glendora
Terminus	Alhambra–San Gabriel Line (discontinued 1941)	Echandia toward Temple City
Terminus	Upland–San Bernardino	Echandia toward San Bernardino
Terminus	Riverside–Rialto (1931–1938)	Echandia toward Riverside
Terminus	Redlands	Echandia toward Redlands
Terminus	Whittier	Echandia toward Whittier
Terminus	South Pasadena; Local	5th & Main toward South Pasadena
Terminus	Annandale (discontinued 1928)	Echandia toward Annandale
- Pacific Electric Building
- U.S. National Register of Historic Places
- Los Angeles Historic-Cultural Monument
- Location within the Los Angeles metropolitan area Location within California Location within the United States
- Coordinates: 34.04495°N 118.2499°W
- Built: 1905
- Architect: Thornton Fitzhugh
- Architectural style: Beaux Arts, Romanesque
- NRHP reference No.: 09000180
- LAHCM No.: 104
- Added to NRHP: April 9, 2009
Track layout
- Source
Location

The historic Pacific Electric Building (also known as the Huntington Building, after the railway’s founder, Henry Huntington, or simply 6th & Main), opened in 1905 in the core of Los Angeles as the main train station for the Pacific Electric Railway, as well as the company's headquarters; Main Street Station served passengers boarding trains for the south and east of Southern California. The building was designed by architect Thornton Fitzhugh. Though not the tallest in Los Angeles, its ten floors enclosed the greatest number of square feet in any building west of Chicago for many decades. Above the train station, covering the lower floors, were five floors of offices; and in the top three was the Jonathan Club, one of the city's leading businessmen's clubs introduced by magnates from the Northeast. (Note: The club moved to its own building on Figueroa Street in 1925.) After the “Great Merger” of Pacific Electric into Southern Pacific Railroad in 1911, the PE Building became the home of Southern Pacific in Los Angeles. In 1925, a second electric rail hub, the Subway Terminal, was opened near Pershing Square to serve the north and west.

== History ==
=== Interurban terminal ===
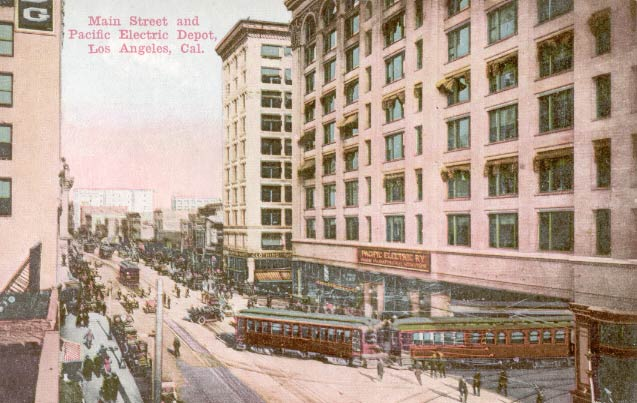
View north on Main Street c. 1910, with the Pacific Electric Building at the right.

The building opened on January 15, 1905 as a terminal for the electric railways being constructed by Henry Huntington. In 1914, a total of 1,626 scheduled Pacific Electric trains entered or left Los Angeles at Main Street Station in 3262 interurban car trips daily. The elevated tracks and passenger concourse on the back of the building were constructed in 1916.

With the great rise in the number of automobiles in the 1920s, congestion — from the cars, from sharing streets with the cars, from sharing the streets with Los Angeles Railway’s Yellow Cars — often caused PE trains to run late, especially while traveling north on Main Street towards Glendale, and west to Hollywood and Santa Monica. To relieve such problems, the California Railroad Commission issued Order No. 9928 in 1922, which called for the Pacific Electric to build a subway to leave downtown's busy streets. The Subway Terminal Building, a second PE terminal, was then built across downtown at the base of Bunker Hill at 4th and Hill Streets by Pershing Square to serve the subway, which opened December 1, 1925, speeding passenger service considerably to Hollywood, Santa Monica, San Fernando, and Glendale.

Interurban rail service remained the 6th and Main PE Terminal's sole function until 1942. Trains entered the back (east side) on ground-level track from San Pedro Street, loaded and unloaded passengers inside the building concourse, then exited onto Main Street (west side) and turned north or south. (See the attached photograph accompanying this article.) In 1942, the terminal was converted to accommodate the Pacific Electric's growing fleet of buses. Trains continued to enter and use the original concourse on New Year's Day to carry crowds to and from the Tournament of Roses events in Pasadena until 1950 when Northern District (Pasadena–Sierra Madre–Monrovia–Glendora) rail service was abandoned. After that, the PE concourse saw no trains and Main Street tracks were no longer used. Remaining service to Glendora, the harbor, and to Bellflower was provided at the rear of the PE terminal on outdoor passenger loading platforms and stub tracks at the rear (east side) of the PE Terminal. Trains used a ramp up from San Pedro Street that crossed Los Angeles Street to reach the loading platforms. Passengers walked into the terminal concourse via an enclosed bridge.

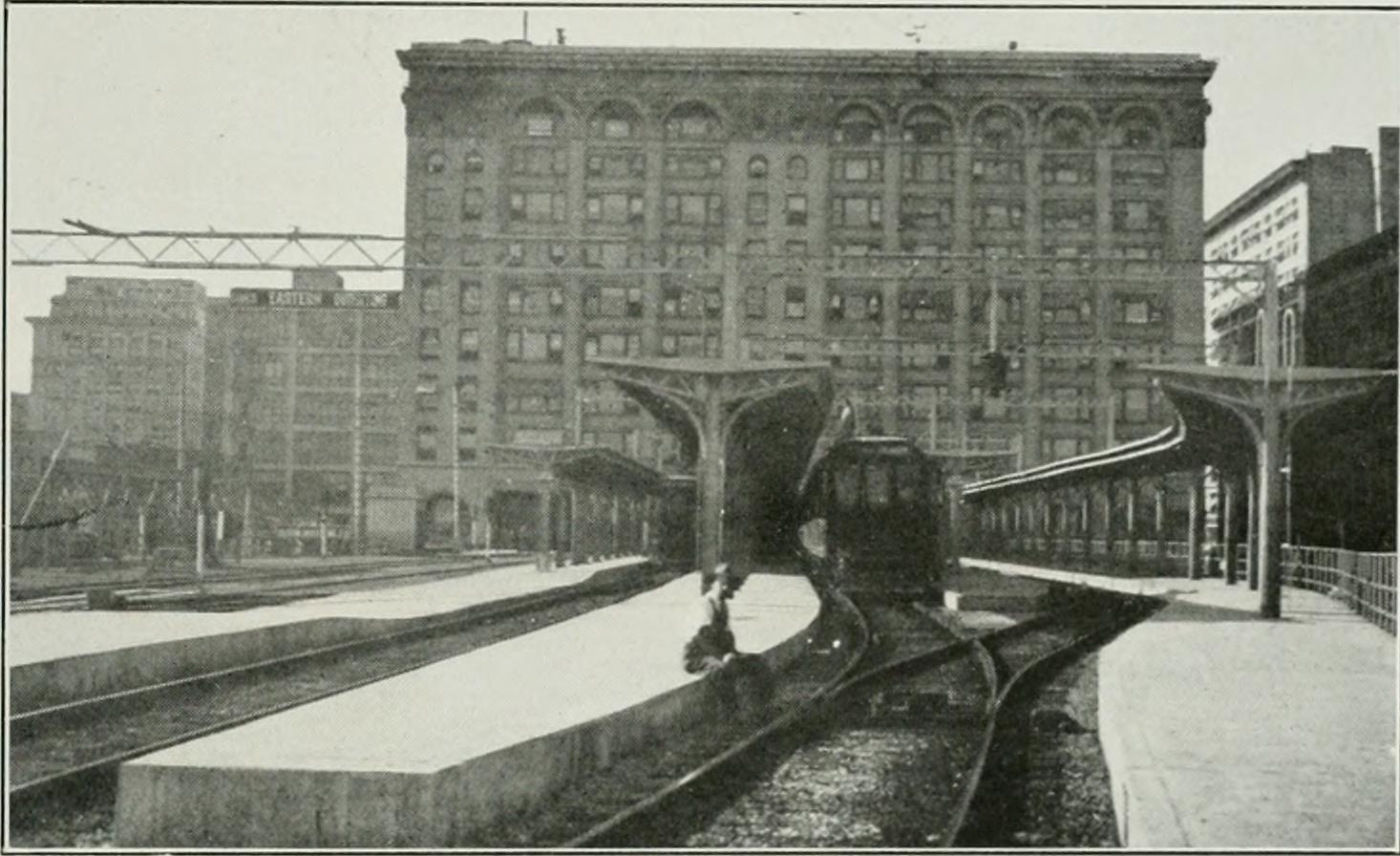
Behind the building, tracks in the yard elevated above the street serve interurbans, c. 1920

Over the next decade, interurban rail routes to Bellflower, the Watts local, and Long Beach and harbor area were abandoned and replaced by motor coaches. The last active route was the Long Beach Line. The final "Blimp" multiple unit interurban train to use the terminal (so named for their unusual plump size and round front windows) to Long Beach was on April 9, 1961 and was in MTA green livery: no longer painted the famous and classic Pacific Electric red. MTA Bus service continued to operate from Sixth and Main until 1964. The MTA ran "Freeway Flyer" motor coach service to old PE destinations from the basement of the nearby Greyhound Terminal, and this continued during Rapid Transit District (SCRTD) operations.

=== After rail service ===
Following the closure of the terminal's main floor depot, the former waiting room and bus concourse were converted to a parking garage. With the commercial and social decline of Main Street and the east side of downtown in general, the rented offices on the upper floors of the building became less desirable and gradually emptied out. The building was largely vacant for many years, though it became a popular location for the movie and television industries. Over 400 location shoots have taken place there, including scenes from Forrest Gump, LA Confidential, Jumpin' Jack Flash and interior shots for the 1970s Streets of San Francisco TV series.

In 1908, Cole's Pacific Electric Buffet was opened on the lower floor of the building and is still there today. As such, Cole's claims to be Los Angeles' oldest restaurant and pub that has been in operation in the same place since its founding. It is one of two local establishments which lay claim to having invented the French dip sandwich. Additionally, the structure held the architectural offices of Greene and Greene circa 1905.

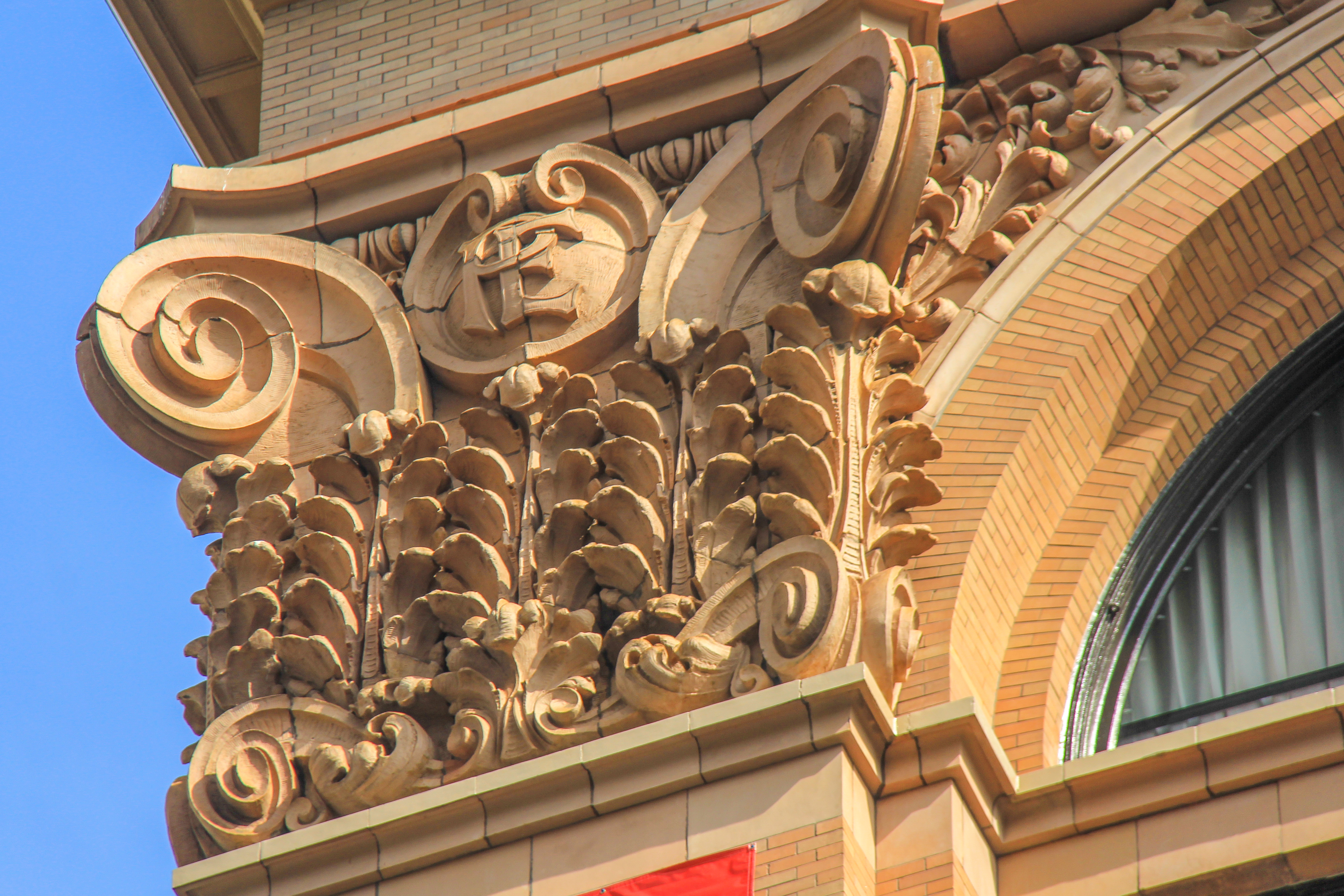
The preserved facade of the building's pilasters, 2014

In 2005, the building was converted by ICO Group into residential live/work lofts and is occupied by residents. Several commercial tenants have filled the first floor spaces along 6th Street. The original Cole's space was renovated and divided to add another restaurant and bar. The building lobby currently displays a number of artifacts left over from its days as once an exceptionally active interurban rail terminal. "DANGER" warnings are set into the sidewalk at the Main Street location where trains once entered and left the building, remaining as evidence of its original grand purpose.

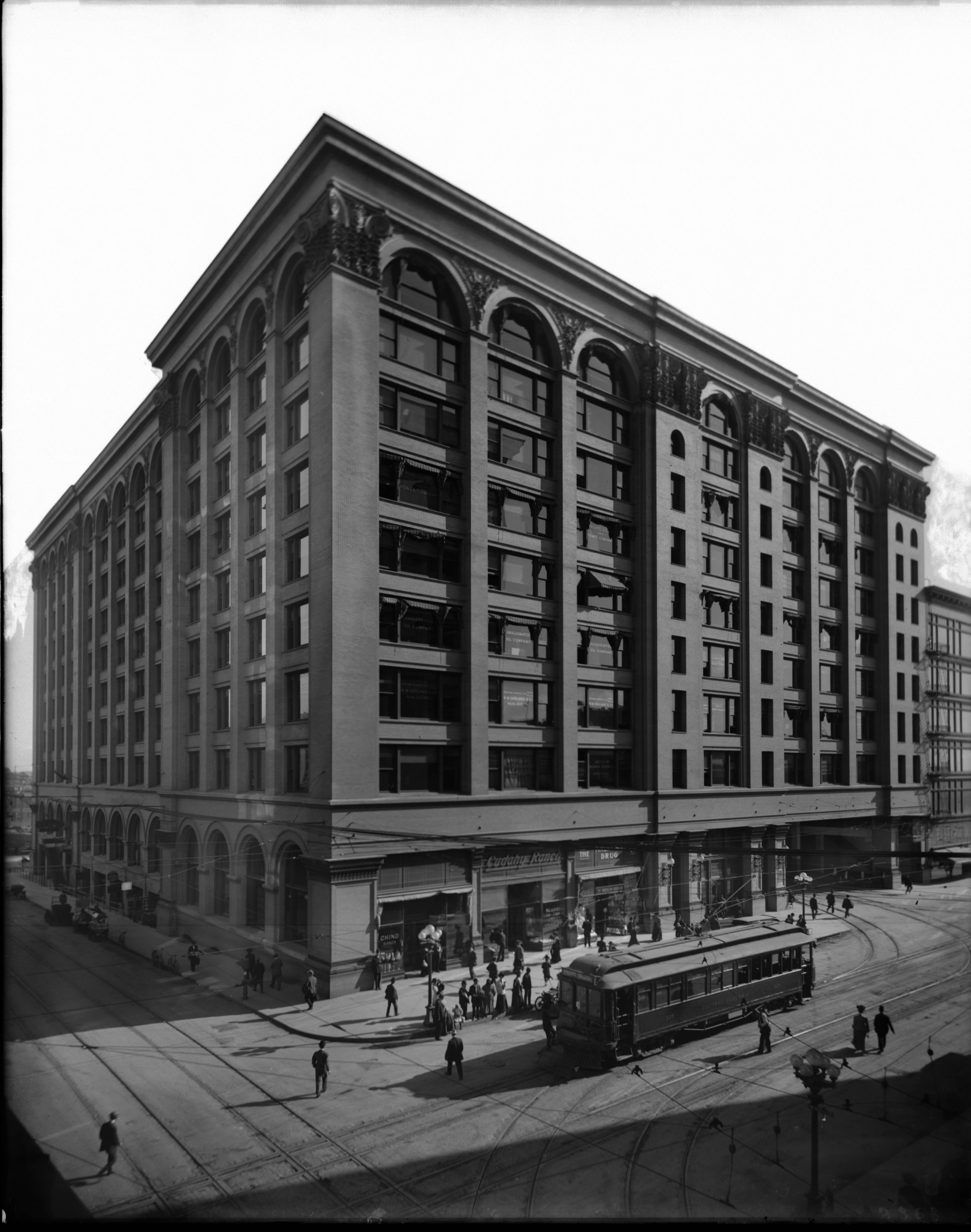
Pacific Electric Building c. 1905–1909

== See also ==
- Pacific Electric Railway
- Subway Terminal Building
