= Southeast Gateway Line =

Planned light rail line in Los Angeles County, California

Overview
- Status: Pre-construction
- Locale: Los Angeles; Downey; Paramount; Artesia
- Termini: Union Station; Pioneer
- Stations: 12
- Website: Southeast Gateway Line

Service
- Type: Light rail
- System: Los Angeles Metro Rail

History
- Planned opening: 2035 (Slauson–Pioneer); 2043 (full line)

Technical
- Line length: 19.3 mi (31.1 km)
- Number of tracks: 2
- Character: Dedicated right of way with elevated, at-grade and underground sections
- Track gauge: 4 ft 8 1/2 in (1,435 mm) standard gauge
- Electrification: 750 V DC overhead catenary

The Southeast Gateway Line (formerly the West Santa Ana Branch Transit Corridor) is a planned light rail line, mostly following the Pacific Electric's historic West Santa Ana Branch, connecting Downtown Los Angeles to the city of Artesia, along with other cities in southeastern Los Angeles County.

== Overview ==
Los Angeles Metro has $4 billion in funds available for construction planned to begin in 2022. The plan included in the Measure M transportation funding measure is to build improvements in two stages.

In June 2017, Metro issued a request for proposal (RFP) to study alternatives for this new line. Metro has narrowed the options to two alternatives and are currently preparing to publish the Draft EIS/EIR for public comment. The draft EIS/EIR is planned to be released in 2020.

The project's timeline was expected to be accelerated under the Twenty-eight by '28 initiative.

The environmental impact report released in 2021 set an estimated cost of $8.6 billion for the line.

The City of Cerritos filed a lawsuit to force Metro to alter the planned route through that city. Under the plan, the new light rail will travel over 1.3 miles (2.09 km) within the city limits with three street crossings between I-605 and the proposed Pioneer station. Metro proposes in Cerritos, at 183rd and Gridley Street, a crossing shared with the City of Artesia, a $687 million dollar above ground bridge crossing. Cerritos prefers a $1.1 billion dollar underground rail options within its limits. Metro has stated a budget difference of $413 million in additional tax payer funds is not needed.

By 2023, the Metro board sought to change the project's name to reflect that it would not reach Santa Ana or Orange County. The $8.5 billion project has been in the planning stage for two decades. Metro estimates it will take 10 years to build, starting in 2025 and opening in 2035. On January 22, 2024, the line's new name was announced by Los Angeles County Supervisor Janice Hahn to be the Southeast Gateway Line.

On March 29, 2024, Metro publicly published the final environmental impact report (EIR) for the project, pending certification by the Metro board of directors. The FTA is expected to issue a record of decision to happen sometime during the summer of 2024. The board voted to certify the EIR at a meeting on April 25, 2024, paving the way for construction to begin by the end of 2024. Metro released an RFP right after the certification, seeking a contractor for pre-construction "Advanced Works".

In October 2024, the California State Transportation Agency (CalSTA) awarded Metro $231 million for construction on the Southeast Gateway Line as part of the $1.3 billion Transit and Intercity Rail Capital Program Cycle 7. Groundbreaking on advance utility relocation began on October 31, 2024.

== Proposed routings and modes ==
The Southeast Gateway Line is proposed as a 19.3-mile (31.1 km) light rail transit line that would connect downtown Los Angeles to Artesia. Along the route, it would also serve the communities of Vernon, Huntington Park, Bell, Cudahy, South Gate, Downey, Paramount, Bellflower and Cerritos in the southeast area of the county.

The southern portion route, east and south of Slauson, leaves the A Line corridor via the former Pacific Electric Whittier Line, continues south paralleling Union Pacific Railroad's San Pedro Subdivision (Florence/Salt Lake to Paramount/Rosecrans), and then transitions to the old Santa Ana right of way (south of Paramount/Rosecrans).

The northern alignment through Downtown Los Angeles is being studied as a possible underground light rail transit route. Six options were proposed. As of 2018, two options were being considered (both of which would connect to the southern alignment by paralleling the A Line between Washington and Slauson stations, as well as part of an existing freight rail line along Randolph Street):

- Alameda Street (Alternative E): A subway under Alameda, passing through the Arts District and connecting to the A and E lines at Little Tokyo/Arts District before continuing to Union Station.
- Downtown Transit Core (Alternative G): Would deviate westward from the Alameda route in the Arts District and continue downtown via a subway, terminating at either 7th Street/Metro Center or Pershing Square station.

By March 2018, Cerritos had opted out of the project, leaving the southern terminus at Pioneer. In November 2018, Metro removed the A Line stations north of Slauson from the study area, citing redundant service and expedited travel times as the prime reasons.

In 2019, Metro announced that as part of its design analysis, it would study opening the line in two stages, with the initial opening $1 billion segment running from Pioneer Station in Artesia north to Slauson Station on the A Line, with the remainder of the $3 billion route into downtown built as Phase 2. Metro staff were "optimistic" that it would be feasible to build the line to Slauson by 2028 with existing Measure M funds. Metro was also studying public–private partnerships that could accelerate the construction schedule of the entire line. The service is not planned to interline with the A Line to 7th Street/Metro Center due to operational constraints.

== Route Selection: Alternative E ==
By 2022, the Metro Board backed the Union Station option as the northern terminus. Construction on the segment south of Slauson is expected to begin construction in 2025 with an estimated opening of 2035. The second phase north of Slauson to Union Station is expected to be completed in 2043 at the earliest.

=== Stations ===
Phase	Expected completion	Station	Location	Connecting services
2	2043	Union Station	Downtown Los Angeles	Amtrak, LAX FlyAway and Metrolink; Paid parking: 3,000 spaces
2	2043	Little Tokyo/Arts District	Little Tokyo	A Line E Line
2	2043	Arts/Industrial District	Arts District	
1	2035	Slauson	Florence-Graham	A Line
1	2035	Pacific/Randolph	Huntington Park/Walnut Park	
1	2035	Florence/Salt Lake	Bell/Cudahy	
1	2035	Firestone	South Gate	
1	2035	Gardendale	Downey	
1	2035	I-105/C Line	Paramount	C Line
1	2035	Paramount/Rosecrans	Paramount	
1	2035	Bellflower	Bellflower	
1	2035	Pioneer	Artesia	

=== Rio Hondo confluence station ===
Metro is evaluating an optional station in South Gate at the confluence of the Los Angeles River and Rio Hondo to connect with future planned development in the surrounding area.

=== Extension into Orange County ===
Metro is evaluating an optional station in Cerritos at Bloomfield Avenue (just north of the Los Angeles-Orange county line) to facilitate a possible future extension into Orange County; it would eventually connect to the under-construction OC Streetcar, which also uses part of the Pacific Electric WSAB right-of-way.

In April 2025, with the replacement of councilmembers Bruce Barrows and Chuong Vo from the Cerritos City Council and Mayor Naresh Solanki, all of whom were opposed to any station in Cerritos, with the election of Mayor Frank Yokoyama and pro-station councilmembers, the Cerritos City Council requested staff to begin communication with Metro. On May 2, 2025, Cerritos sent a letter of intent to Metro, stating their intent to study possible station sites. At their May 22, 2025, meeting, the city reviewed an informational report about the Southeast Gateway Line. On June 26, 2025, the Cerritos City Council approved a $127,000 contract with Cityworks Design, a firm which has worked with Metro on the Southeast Gateway Line for the previous eight years, to study possible station locations. The study is planned to begin in July 2025 and be completed in six months. Cerritos city staff is also working to schedule a joint meeting with Metro and the Orange County Transportation Authority (OCTA) to discuss potentially extending the Southeast Gateway Line into Orange County.
