= Redlands Line =

Former interurban railway line in California, US

Redlands
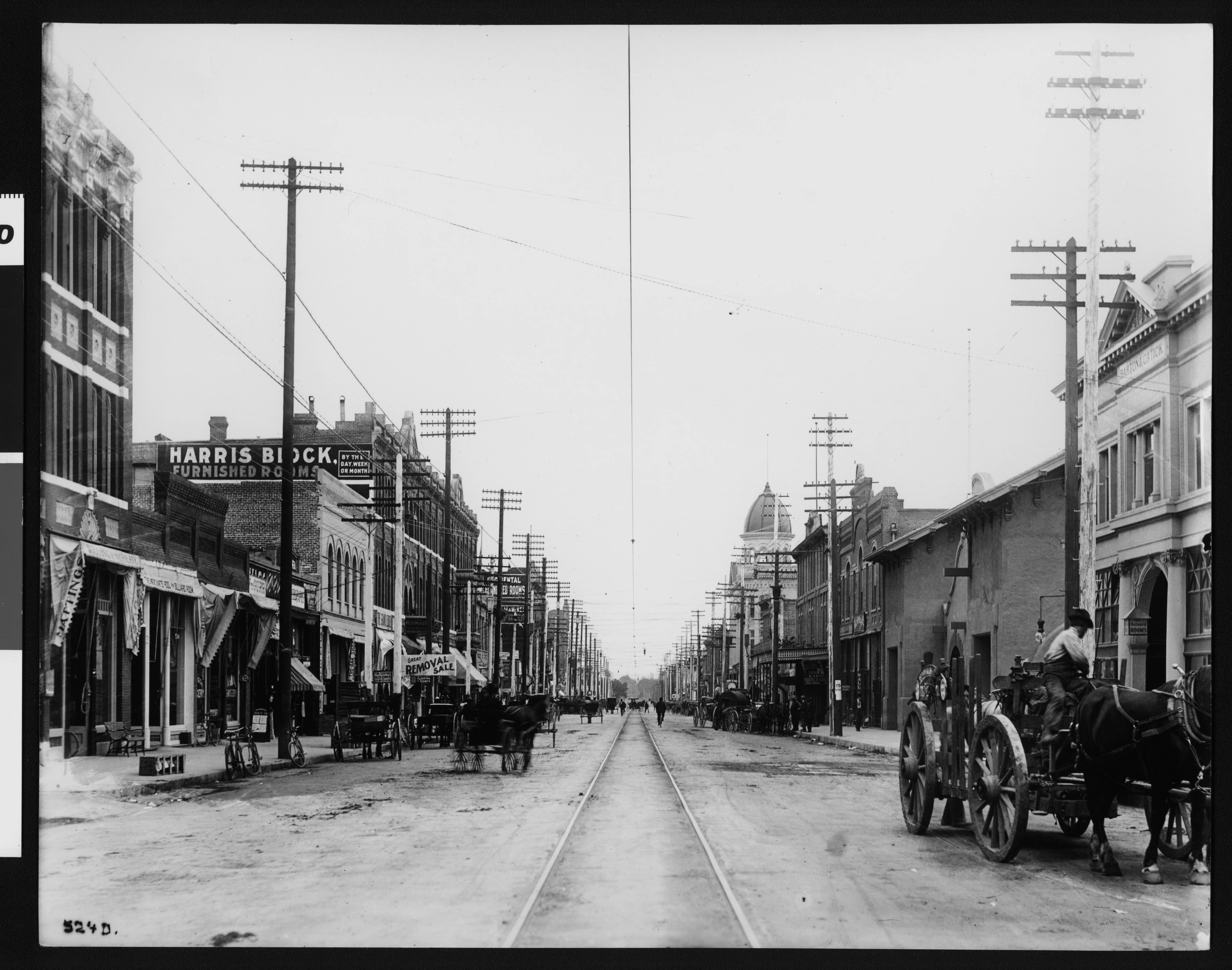
- Tracks and trolley wire run down the center of Third Street in San Bernardino looking west, 1905

Overview
- Locale: Inland Empire
- Termini: San Bernardino; Redlands

Service
- Type: Interurban
- System: Pacific Electric

History
- Opened: March 10, 1903
- Closed: July 19, 1936

Technical
- Number of tracks: 1
- Track gauge: 1,435 mm (4 ft 8 1/2 in) standard gauge
- Electrification: Overhead line, 600 V DC

The Redlands Line is a former Pacific Electric interurban railway line in the Inland Empire. The route provided suburban service between San Bernardino and Redlands.

== History ==
Constructed by the San Bernardino Valley Traction Company starting in 1902, the line began regular service on March 10, 1903. Cars initially operated into San Bernardino under trackage rights via the Redlands Street Railway until the two merged in June after opening. Cars initially terminated at Urbita Springs. The San Bernardino Valley Traction Company was absorbed into Pacific Electric under the Great Merger in 1911. By March 1913 the inbound terminus was changed from Urbita Springs to the San Bernardino station.

By January 1916 through-routing with the San Bernardino–Riverside Line had begun, forming the Redlands–Riverside Line. The line also supported heavy usage by freight trains transporting fruit. On November 1, 1920, through service was provided to Los Angeles for the first time, with Redlands cars appended to Upland–San Bernardino Line trains. The 2 hour 50 minute journey was the longest single service ever offered by the Pacific Electric. Between April and June 1928 through-routing was discontinued with the San Bernardino–Riverside Line as part of a scheme developed by the California Railroad Commission; this was reverted after proving unsuccessful. Service ended after July 19, 1936, leaving Redlands as the largest city in the Pacific Electric system served exclusively by buses.
