= Firestone station =

Los Angeles Metro Rail station

Firestone
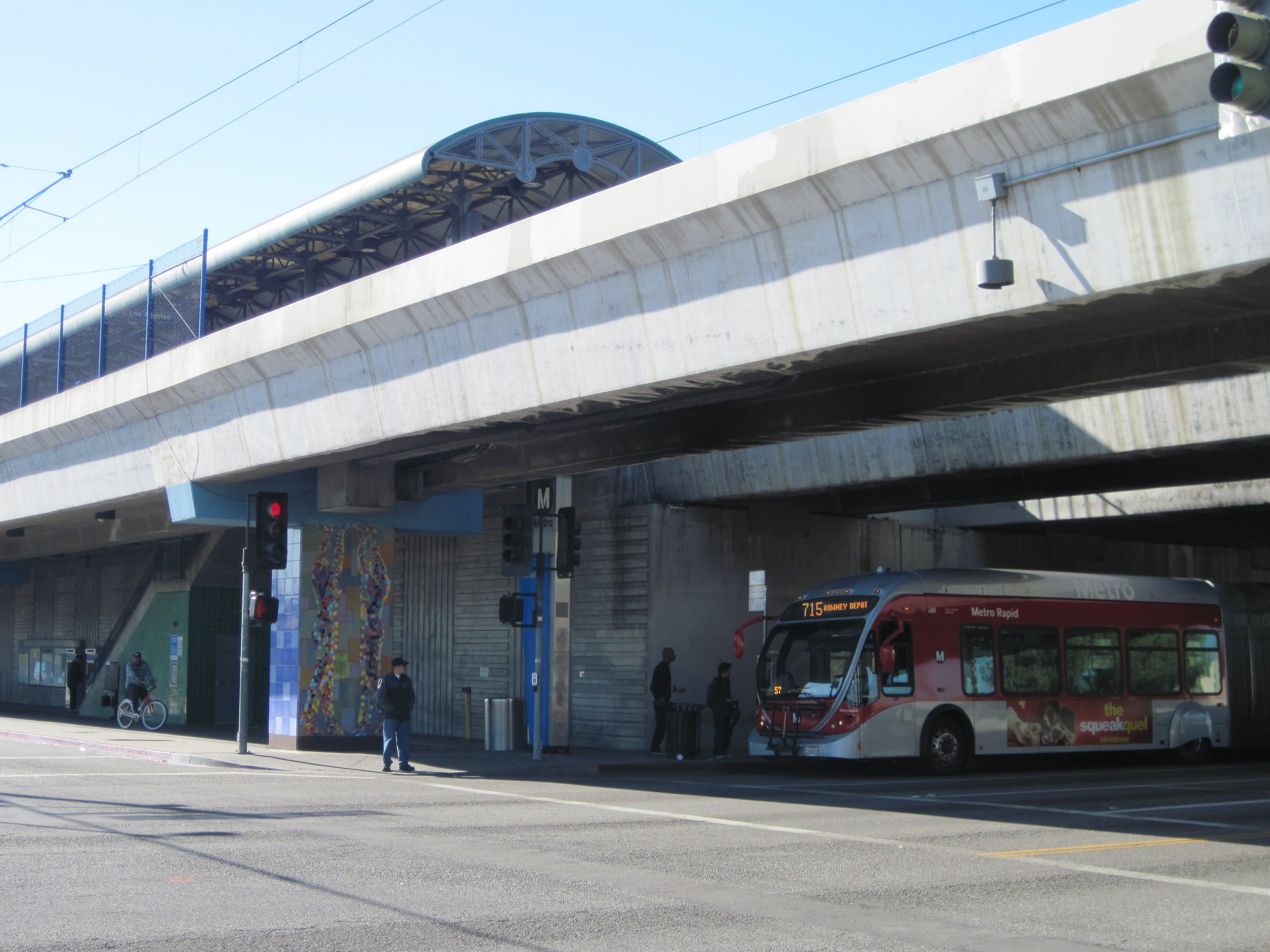
- Firestone station, as seen from street level

General information
- Location: 8615 Graham Avenue; Firestone Park, California
- Coordinates: 33.9599°N 118.2432°W
- Owner: Los Angeles County Metropolitan Transportation Authority
- Platforms: 1 island platform
- Tracks: 2
- Connections: Los Angeles Metro Bus; the Link

Construction
- Structure type: Elevated
- Cycle facilities: Racks
- Accessible: Yes

History
- Opened: July 14, 1990; 36 years ago
- Rebuilt: November 2, 2019
- Former names: Graham (Pacific Electric)

Passengers
- FY 2025: 1,537 (avg. wkdy boardings)

Services
| Preceding station | Metro Rail | Following station |
|---|---|---|
| 103rd Street/Watts Towers toward Long Beach | A Line | Florence toward Pomona |
Former services (as Graham)
| Preceding station | Pacific Electric | Following station |
|---|---|---|
| Latin toward Morgan Avenue | Long Beach | Nadeau toward Pacific Electric Building |
| Latin toward Santa Ana SP Depot | Santa Ana | Nadeau toward Pacific Electric Building |
| Latin toward Clifton | Redondo Beach via Gardena | Nadeau toward Pacific Electric Building |
| Kent toward Watts | Watts; Local | Edgewood Park toward Pacific Electric Building |
Location

Firestone station is an elevated light rail station on the A Line of the Los Angeles Metro Rail system. The station is located between Graham Avenue and the Union Pacific freight railroad's Wilmington Subdivision (the historic route of the Pacific Electric Railway), and elevated over the intersection of Firestone Boulevard, after which the station is named, in the unincorporated Los Angeles County community of Firestone Park.

== Service ==
=== Hours and frequency ===
A Line service hours are from approximately 4:30 a.m. and 11:45 p.m. daily. Trains operate every 8 minutes during peak hours, Monday to Friday. Trains run every 10 minutes, during midday on weekdays and weekends, from 9:00 a.m. to 7:00 p.m. Night and early morning service is approximately every 20 minutes every day.

=== Connections ===
As of December 15, 2024, the following connections are available:

- Los Angeles Metro Bus: 115
- the Link: Florence-Firestone/Walnut Park

== Notable places nearby ==
The station is within walking distance of the following notable places:

- Colonel Leon H. Washington County Park
