= Florence station (Los Angeles Metro) =

Los Angeles Metro Rail station

Florence
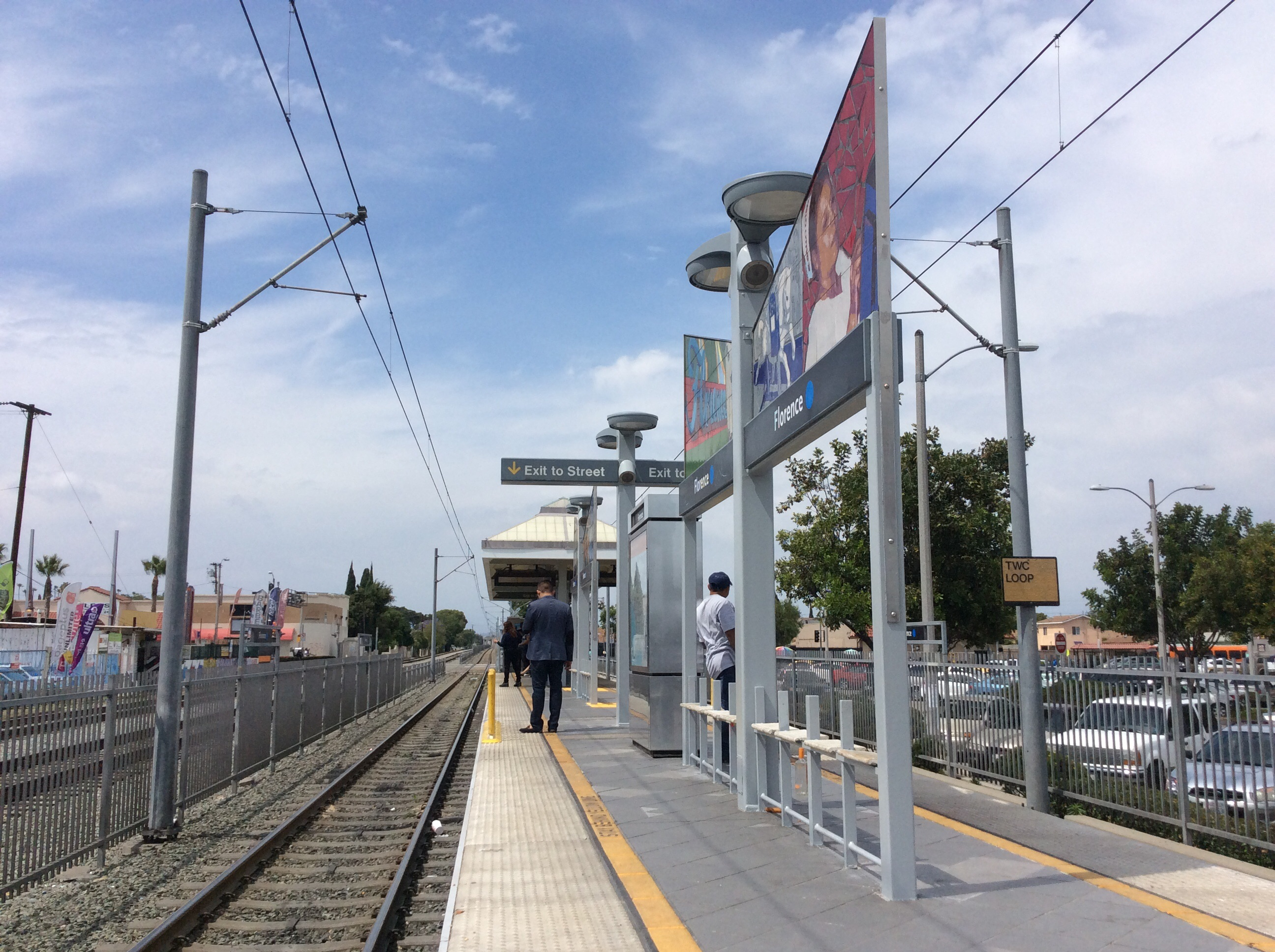
- Florence station platform

General information
- Location: 7225 Graham Avenue; Los Angeles, California
- Coordinates: 33.9748°N 118.2430°W
- Owner: Los Angeles County Metropolitan Transportation Authority
- Platforms: 1 island platform
- Tracks: 2
- Connections: Los Angeles Metro Bus; LADOT DASH; The Link

Construction
- Structure type: At-grade
- Parking: 100 spaces
- Cycle facilities: Racks
- Accessible: Yes

History
- Opened: July 14, 1990; 36 years ago
- Rebuilt: November 2, 2019

Passengers
- FY 2025: 2,431 (avg. wkdy boardings)

Services
Preceding station	Metro Rail	Following station
Firestone toward Long Beach	A Line	Slauson toward Pomona
Former services
Preceding station	Pacific Electric	Following station
Nadeau toward Morgan Avenue	Long Beach	Florencita Park toward Pacific Electric Building
Nadeau toward Santa Ana SP Depot	Santa Ana	Florencita Park toward Pacific Electric Building
Nadeau toward Clifton	Redondo Beach via Gardena	Florencita Park toward Pacific Electric Building
Ionia toward Watts	Watts; Local	Florencita Park toward Pacific Electric Building
Location

Florence station is an at-grade light rail station on the A Line of the Los Angeles Metro Rail system. The station is located alongside the Union Pacific freight railroad's Wilmington Subdivision (the historic route of the Pacific Electric Railway), at its intersection with Florence Avenue, after which the station is named, in the unincorporated Los Angeles County neighborhood of Florence.

== Service ==
=== Hours and frequency ===
A Line service hours are from approximately 4:30 a.m. and 11:45 p.m. daily. Trains operate every 8 minutes during peak hours, Monday to Friday. Trains run every 10 minutes, during midday on weekdays and weekends, from 9:00 a.m. to 7:00 p.m. Night and early morning service is approximately every 20 minutes every day.

=== Connections ===
As of December 15, 2024, the following connections are available:

- Los Angeles Metro Bus: 102, 110, 111, 611
- LADOT DASH: Chesterfield Square
- the Link: Florence-Firestone/Walnut Park
