= Watt station =

Watt station may refer to:

== Transportation ==
- Watt/I-80 station, a light rail station in Sacramento, California
- Watt/I-80 West station, a light rail station in Sacramento, California
- Watt/Manlove station, a light rail station in Sacramento, California
- Regensdorf-Watt railway station, a railway station in Switzerland

== Other uses ==
- WATT, an AM radio station in Cadillac, Michigan

== See also ==
- KivuWatt Power Station, a thermal power plant in Kibuye, Rwanda
- Watts Station, an historic rail station in Los Angeles, California
- 103rd Street/Watts Towers station, a light rail station in Los Angeles, California
