= La Sombrita =

Prototype sunshade for the Los Angeles Department of Transportation

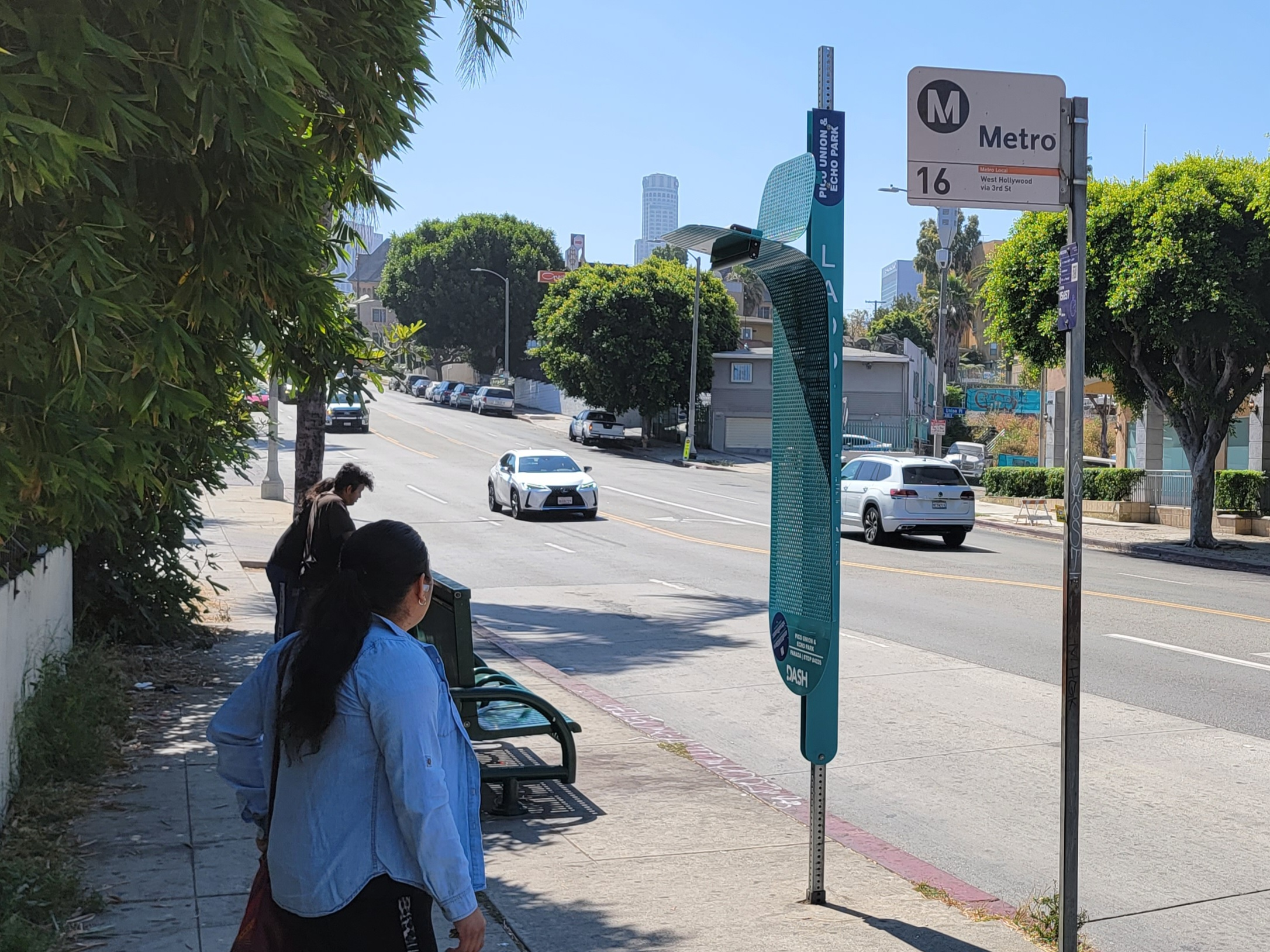
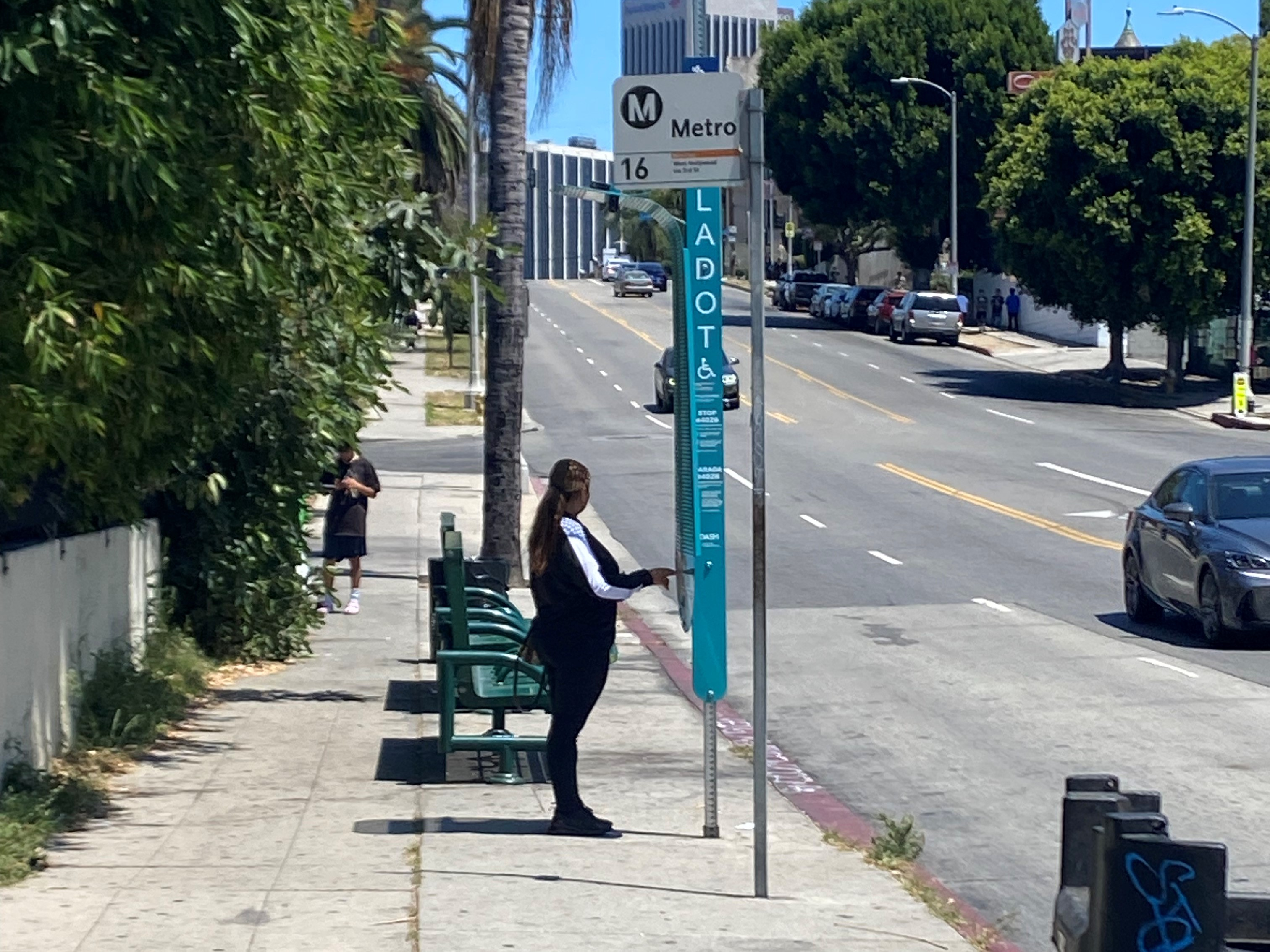
This is the Sombrita featured in the LADOT press conference. In the early morning hours (left), it is unable to cast an effective shadow, so passengers instead wait in the shade of privately owned trees. In the afternoon (right), the Sombrita is able to cast shade effectively, providing shade to a passenger waiting for the bus.

La Sombrita (Spanish for "The Little Shade") is a prototype sunshade created for the Los Angeles Department of Transportation (LADOT). Its purpose was to assist female bus riders by offering shade during the hottest hours of the day and providing sidewalk lighting at night. This was especially targeted at locations where the swift construction of traditional bus shelters would be impractical or expensive. The unveiling of La Sombrita took place at a press conference on May 18, 2023, at the 3rd St/Union Ave bus stop in Westlake. Initially, Las Sombritas were installed at four DASH bus stops across the city.

The concept of La Sombrita originated from the need to address gender equity within LADOT's operations. It was introduced as part of their Gender Equity Action Plan, an initiative stemming from the findings of the 2021 study called "Changing Lanes." This study's final report highlighted that the transportation system in Los Angeles seemed to cater to adult male commuters, despite the majority of riders being women. To tackle this issue, LADOT launched the "Next Stop" action plan, aiming to implement policy recommendations across various aspects of the department's functions.

The public response to La Sombrita was immediate and almost universally negative. Many individuals criticized its design and the decision to prioritize cost-efficiency over more substantial interventions. Criticism came from across the political spectrum. On the left, some accused the Los Angeles government of systemic apathy and neglect towards public transit and its users, while right-wing critics utilized it to exemplify bureaucratic inefficiencies within LADOT, attributing these issues to excessive regulation in a city governed by Democrats.

In response to the public outcry, some advocates for public transportation came to the defense of La Sombrita, highlighting that the project was not funded by public money. LADOT also defended the project, clarifying that its purpose was not to replace bus shelters or streetlights but to offer an affordable fix in areas where permanent solutions were not immediately feasible. Instead, it was conceived as a creative response to a specific problem – providing a solution for narrow sidewalks where traditional bus shelters could not be accommodated. These defenders emphasized that La Sombrita is a pilot initiative, and its design will evolve based on user feedback.

== Design ==
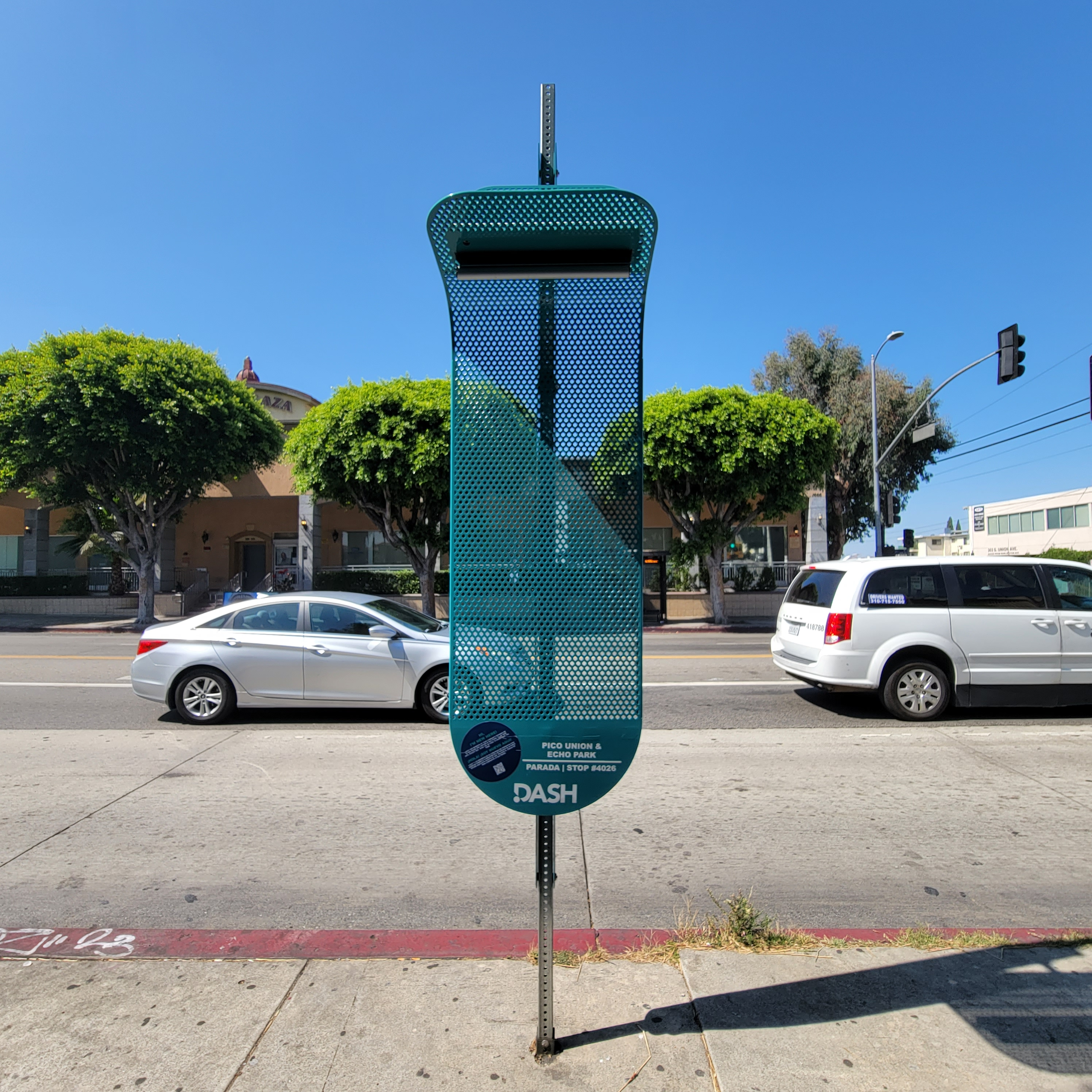
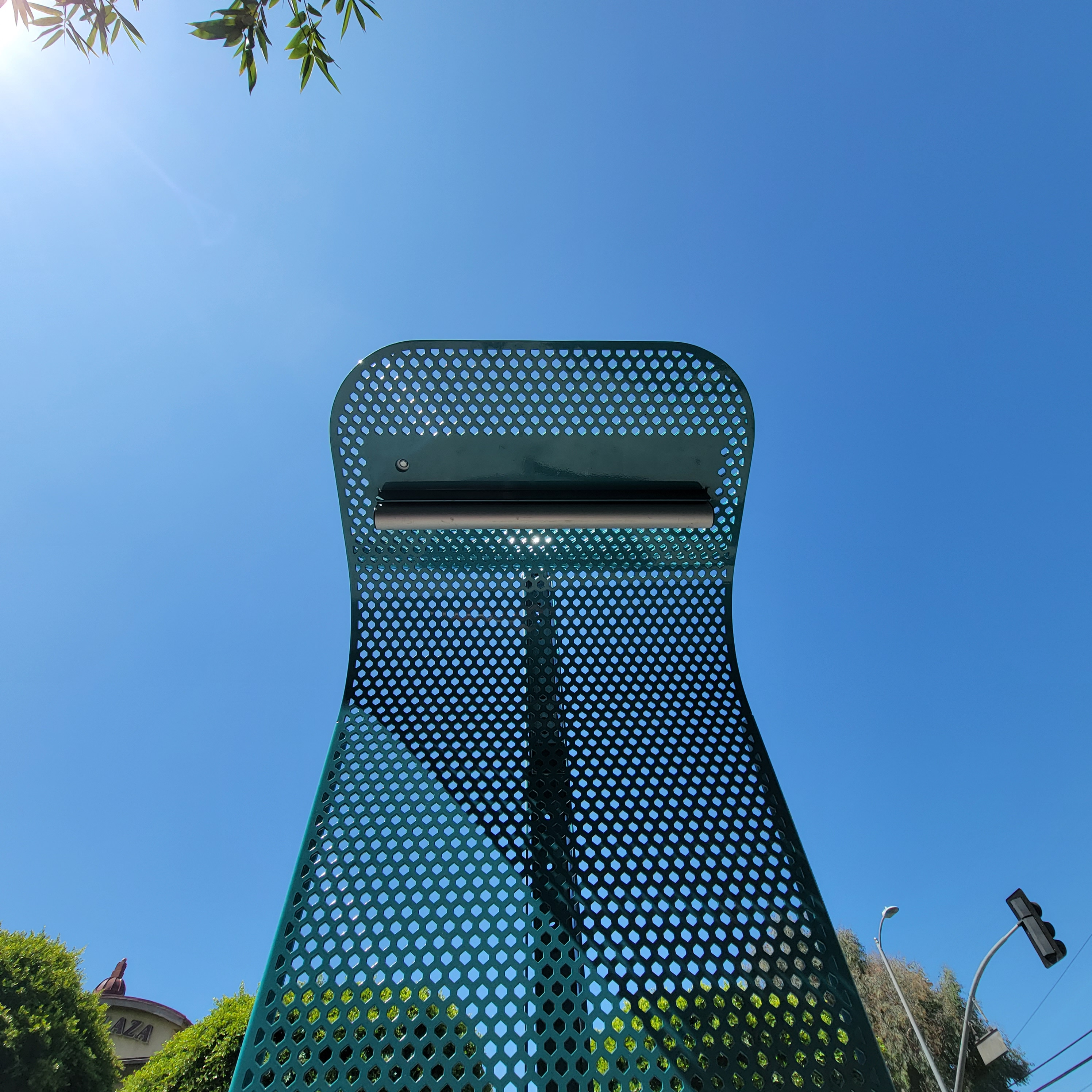
La Sombrita is made of perforated metal rolled to create a shelf. The device is installed on an LADOT sign pole. The lights installed on Las Sombritas are powered by a solar panel affixed to the top of the device.

La Sombrita's design is compact and lightweight, built from one piece of 26-inch-wide (66 cm) perforated metal rolled at the top to form an angled shelf. The structure is teal, with a solar panel affixed to the top of the shelf and a light underneath to provide light during the night. The entire device is designed to fit on pre-existing signposts that LADOT had installed for their bus stop signs.

== History ==
=== Background ===
For years, California's public transit systems have faced criticism for their lack of shelters at bus stops. In Los Angeles specifically, half a million citizens rode on the bus on an average weekday in July 2022. And yet, in the same time period, of the 12,200 bus stops served by Metro, only a quarter had any kind of shade or rain shelter. Due to the rising climate crisis, health risks associated with prolonged exposure to intense heat and sunlight have arisen in bus-riding Californians, leading to increased public scrutiny. The Los Angeles City Council primarily focuses on deals with advertising companies to finance the construction of new bus shelters. In exchange, these companies are given advertising space on the shelter itself. This strategy, however, does not produce shelters at speeds that Angelenos expect, leading to increasing frustration on behalf of the population that rides the bus. In the two decades prior to 2022, despite promising 2,185 new shelters, the ad-driven model delivered only 660. Despite this, the City Council signed a new contract with Tranzito-Vector, LLC to install, upgrade, and maintain transit shelters in exchange for digital advertising displayed on those shelters. Mobility advocacy organizations expressed frustration at this decision, as they expect little to no effective change with the new contract.

=== Changing Lanes ===
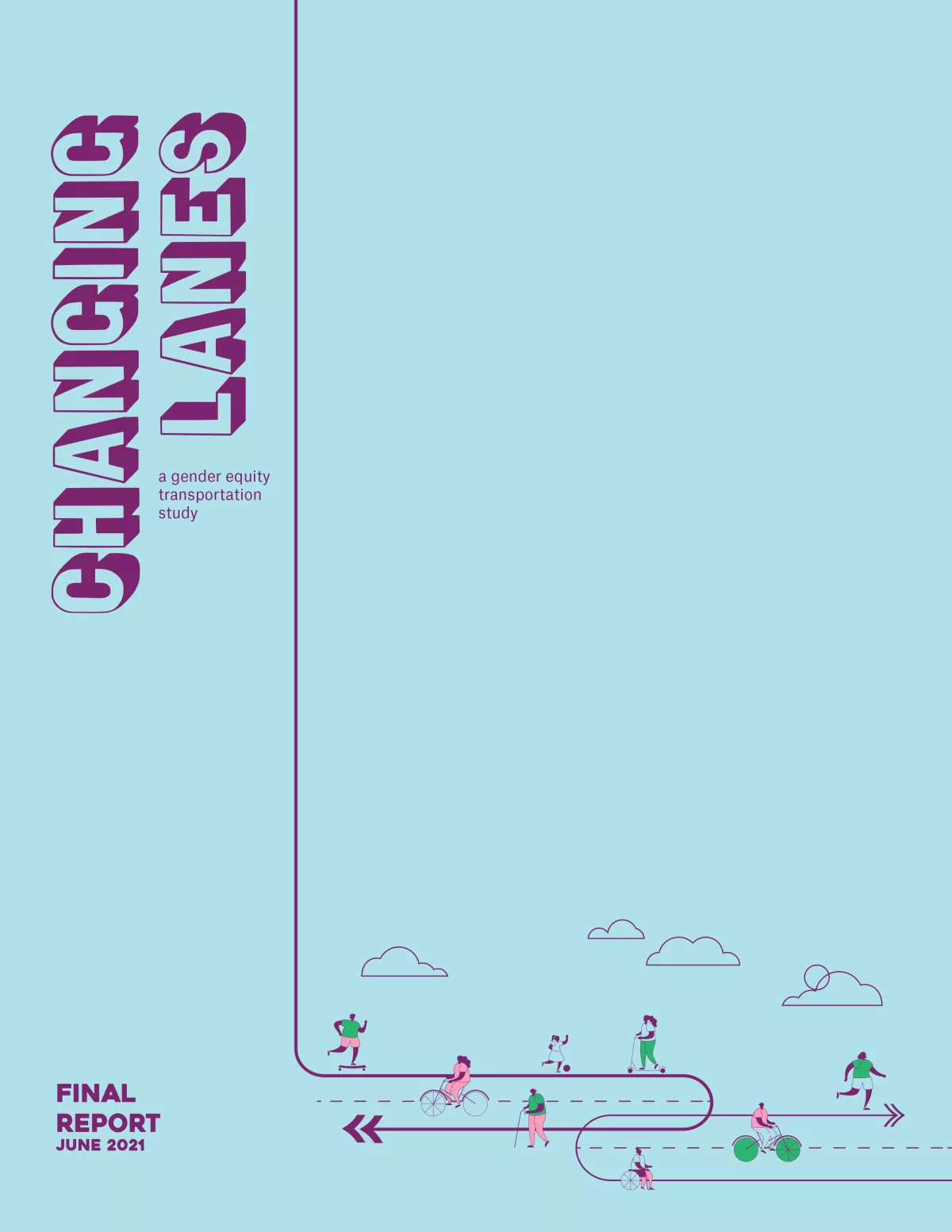
The cover to the Changing Lanes final report

In 2019, LADOT commissioned "Changing Lanes," a study designed to investigate the needs and experiences of women navigating the transportation system in Los Angeles, as the department lacked substantive data on the subject. Changing Lanes employed a wide variety of research methods, including meta-analysis of existing studies, collecting survey data, conducting individual interviews with women who rode on public transit, and convening community meetings to assess opinions and collect data on how gender and transportation in Los Angeles were connected. The study was led by Kounkuey Design Initiative (KDI), a nonprofit focused on community development, who had worked with LADOT previously for "Play Streets," a project which temporarily shut down city streets, turning them into playgrounds.

The study was performed in three Los Angeles neighborhoods – Sun Valley, Watts, and Sawtelle. These areas were chosen to represent recurrent neighborhood typologies in Los Angeles based on population density, size, and demographic characteristics. They were selected, in part, due to their high proportions of black and indigenous women of color living in zero-car households.

In 2021, LADOT published the study's final report, titled Changing Lanes: A Gender Equity Transportation Study. The report concluded that women of color were systemically failed by the Los Angeles transportation system. Namely, historic under-investment, racist housing and zoning practices, and economic disenfranchisement had created barriers for women of color to access safe transportation. Changing Lanes recommended many changes to LADOT policy, including collecting more and better data across Los Angeles and improving travel itineraries to improve the design and safety of women's travel patterns. That same year, in response to the report, LADOT added more on-demand stops on four DASH bus routes during nighttime hours to shorten risky walks in dangerous neighborhoods.

Changing Lanes also noted that the severe lack of bus stop infrastructure, a long-standing issue in Los Angeles, disproportionately affected low-income neighborhoods. This issue was especially difficult to overcome, as bus shelter installation had been caught up in years of bureaucratic red tape; the process required the input of multiple city agencies and was routinely sidelined at the whim of City Council members. While LADOT's Gender Equity Action Plan (forthcoming) will guide the implementation of policy solutions, they also chose to pilot a short-term solution for light and shade at bus stops.

=== Creation of La Sombrita ===
Kounkuey Design Initiative produced many designs for standing shade structures; some included a rotating installation that would track the sun and provide consistent shade throughout the day, and others included seating, but they instead decided to focus on piloting a model that could be installed in minutes on preexisting LADOT signposts. This would bypass additional permitting, streamlining the construction process. La Sombrita is specifically designed to test bus stop lights and shade where bus shelters are not currently viable, such as on narrow sidewalks. The design and prototyping was funded by a grant from the Robert Wood Johnson Foundation. Including design, materials, and engineering, each prototype costs around $10,000. KDI's founding principal and chief executive, Chelina Odbert, claimed that if mass-produced, the cost would drop to $2,000 per unit.

== Public backlash ==
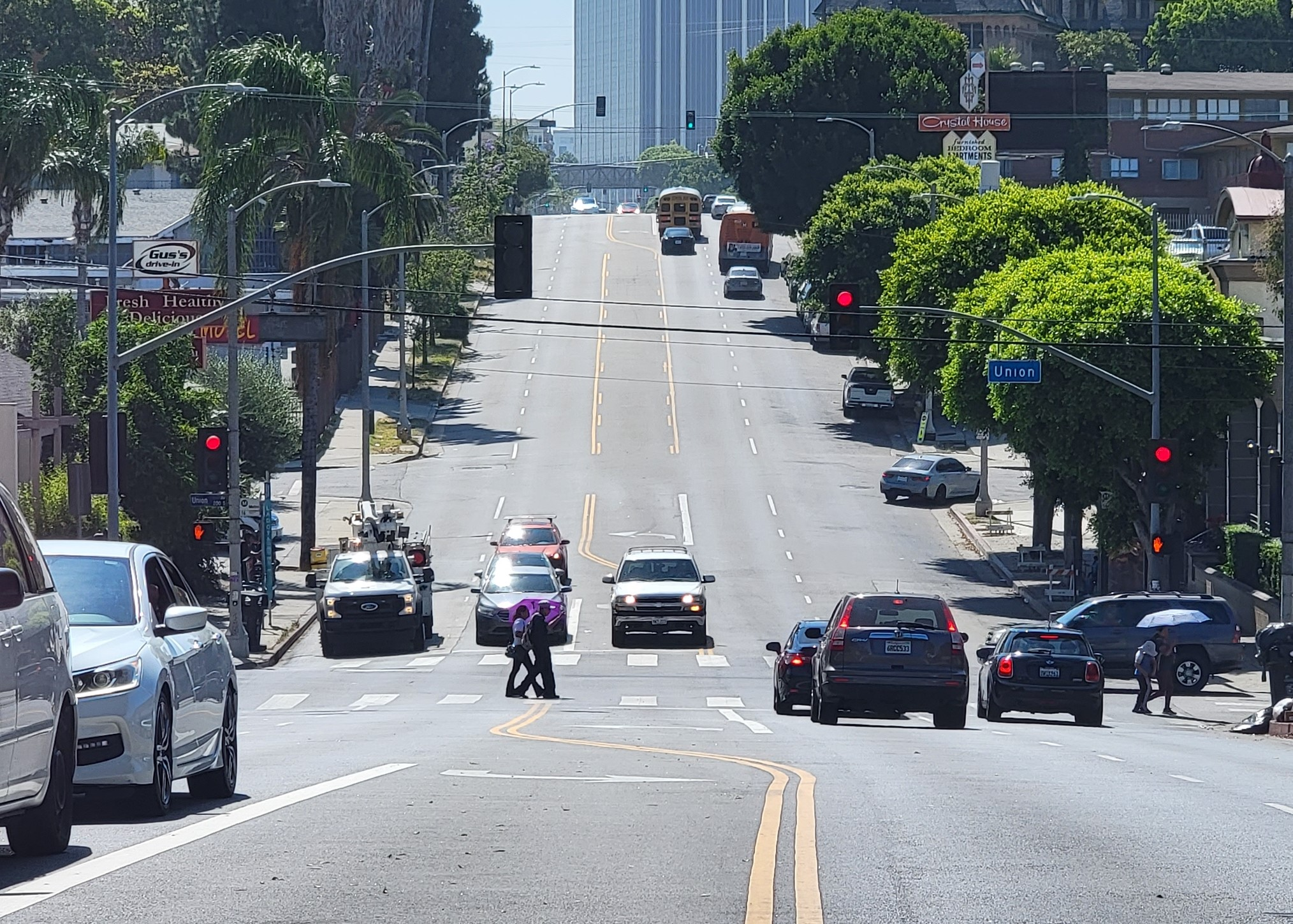
Images like this one were circulated widely during the backlash to La Sombrita. It depicts both sides of 3rd Street, showing how the side of the road opposite La Sombrita, on the right, features a bus shelter and several trees to provide comfortable seating and shade.

The public's reaction to La Sombrita was almost universally negative, with Twitter users initially expressing strong disapproval before opinions spread to mainstream news outlets across the political spectrum. Critics listed many issues they saw with La Sombrita such as it being immobile or not turning towards the sun therefore, making it less effective during most hours of the day. The design uses perforated metal, through which sunlight is able to shine and rain is able to fall. Some critics noted that on the other side of 3rd Street, away from the site of the La Sombrita press conference, sat a Metro bus shelter and multiple planters with trees, which provided much more shade and comfort. These critics contended that the installation of a proper Metro shelter or the planting of trees would have been far better solutions. La Sombrita's nighttime light also gained notoriety when the Spanish-language broadcasting station Univision 34 aired a report on La Sombrita, showcasing how the device's light was incredibly dim during night hours, rendering the device ineffective at increasing safety after dark.

== Arguments in favor ==
A few journalists and activists came out in defense of La Sombrita in the week after the controversy had died down. The Los Angeles Times published an article saying that La Sombrita's faults and failures were overblown by the public, as did Bloomberg News. These articles say that several aspects of the project were exaggerated or misunderstood. The articles note that no public money was spent on the prototyping of La Sombrita; all of the money had been obtained from the Robert Wood Johnson Foundation, despite claims that taxpayer money had been wasted. The Los Angeles Times article wrote that La Sombrita was never designed to be a full replacement for bus shelters. The LADOT (which spearheaded the project) does not have the public charge to build bus shelters; that responsibility is given to the Bureau of Street Services, a subdivision of the Los Angeles County Department of Public Works. The Department of Public Works can take years of planning and coordination to build standard new bus shelters, hence the desire to go around them for a quicker and simpler project. Additionally, even to the extent that La Sombrita was a disappointment, it was only a prototype, and it is possible later versions would be more useful.

Streets For All, a Los Angeles nonprofit focused in part on advocacy for public transit, praised LADOT for trying new and experimental ideas to fix long-standing issues, and emphasized the need for immediate and scalable projects that can be budgeted and carried out at a fast pace. They stressed that Angelenos frustrated at La Sombrita should instead focus their anger at the bureaucracy itself that, they argue, made projects like La Sombrita the only viable paths forward.
