= Watts Line =

Watts
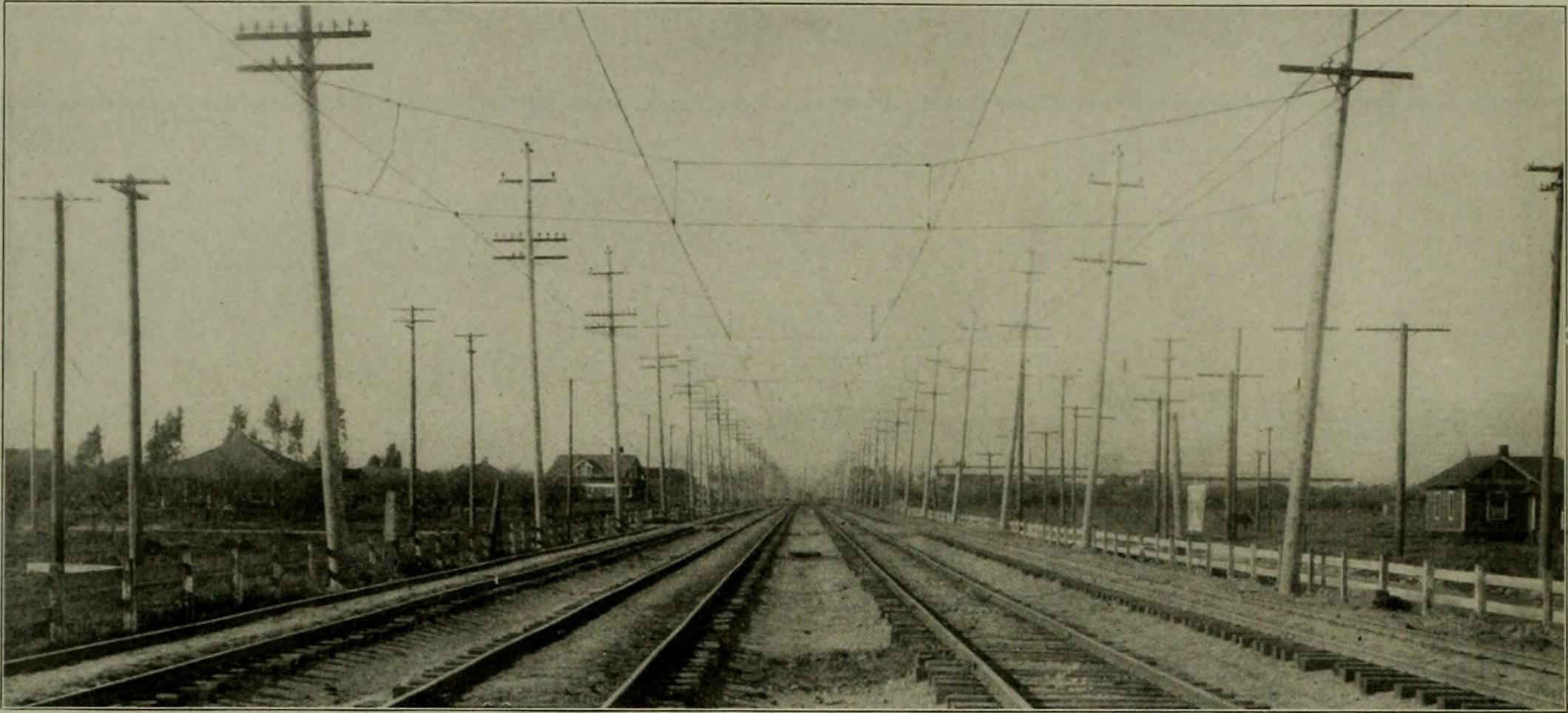
- The quadruple-tracked line south of Downtown Los Angeles

Overview
- Owner: Southern Pacific Railroad
- Locale: Los Angeles, California
- Termini: Pacific Electric Building; Watts

Service
- Type: Streetcar
- System: Pacific Electric
- Operator(s): Pacific Electric (1904–1958) Los Angeles Metropolitan Transit Authority (1958–1959)
- Daily ridership: 37,436 (peak, 1946); 4,325 (close, 1958)

History
- Opened: c. 1906
- Closed: November 2, 1959

Technical
- Line length: 7.45 mi (11.99 km)
- Number of tracks: 2–4
- Track gauge: 1,435 mm (4 ft 8 1/2 in) standard gauge
- Electrification: Overhead line, 600 V DC

The Watts Line was a local line of the Pacific Electric Railway that operated between the Pacific Electric Building in Downtown Los Angeles and the Watts Station at 103rd Street in Watts. It was the primary local service for the Southern District, which also included the Long Beach, San Pedro, Santa Ana and Whittier interurban lines. The route operated along the Southern Division's Four Tracks route, with the Watts Line using the outer tracks and the Long Beach line and other limited stop lines using the inner tracks.

== History ==
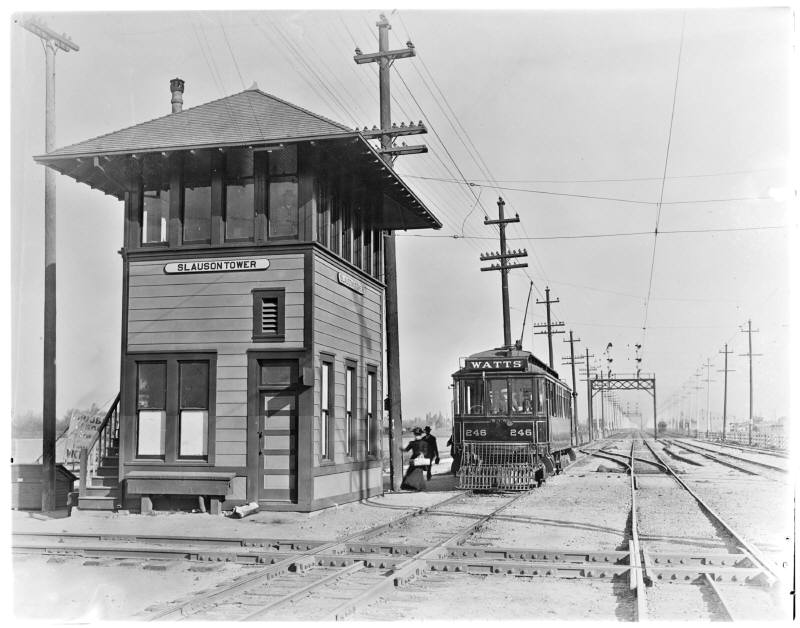
A Watts car at Slauson Junction prior to the expansion to four tracks, c. 1902

Pacific Electric undertook a program to quadruple-track the Long Beach Line between Los Angeles and Watts starting in 1906. Local service was separated from the Long Beach Line in April 1907 when the four tracks were completed to Slauson Junction. Completion of the line south Watts was delayed due to lack of materials, caused by sudden call to double track the new Covina Line. The full four-track system opened that October. Local trains ran on the inside set of tracks while Watts Locals ran on the outside set.

During the 1910s, its service was combined with the South Pasadena Line of the Northern District. From 1938 to 1950, the line was combined with the Sierra Vista Line, which was the main local line in the Northern District. Streetcars were removed and replaced with a parallel bus service on November 2, 1959.

Tracks north of Washington Boulevard were removed or paved over (except a short spur track) after PE service ended. In the late 1980s, the right of way was rehabilitated with one or two tracks used for freight rail (with electrification removed) and two tracks rebuilt to modern light rail specifications. Service along the line between Washington Boulevard and 103rd Street recommenced in 1990 as the Los Angeles Metro Blue Line (renamed the A Line in 2019), with stations at Washington Boulevard, Vernon Avenue, Slauson Avenue, Florence Avenue, Firestone Boulevard, and 103rd Street.

== Stops and stations ==
The following were stops and stations along the Watts line:

- Pacific Electric Building (6th & Main)
- 7th & Main
- 8th & Main
- 9th & Main
- 9th & Los Angeles
- 9th & Maple
- 9th & San Pedro Street
- 9th & Stanford
- 9th & Central Avenue
- 9th & Naomi Street (inbound)
- 9th & Hooper (outbound)
  - (begin Four Tracks)
- Long Beach Avenue
- 14th Street
- 16th Street
- Washington Blvd
- 20th Street
- 24th Street (Amoco Junction) – interchange with Air Line
- Adams Boulevard
- Santa Barbara Avenue
- 41st Street
- Vernon Avenue
- 48th Place
- 52nd Street
- 55th Street
- Slauson Avenue (Slauson Junction) – interchange with Whittier
- 60th Street
- Gage Avenue
- 68th Street
- 68th Street
- Florence Avenue
- 76th Street
- Nadeau
- 82nd Place
- Graham
- Kent (88th)
- 92nd Street
- 97th Street
- Watts (103rd Street)
