= Los Angeles County Department of Public Works =

American local government agency in California

Coordinates: 34°05′9″N 118°08′56″W

Department overview
- Formed: 1985 (Merger)
- Preceding agencies: County Engineer; Flood Control District; Road Department
- Jurisdiction: Los Angeles County, California
- Headquarters: Alhambra, California
- Employees: 4,269 (2016)
- Annual budget: $4,637,304,000 (2025)
- Department executive: Mark Pestrella, Director
- Website: www.pw.lacounty.gov

The Los Angeles County Department of Public Works (LACDPW) is responsible for the construction and operation of Los Angeles County's roads, building safety, sewerage, and flood control. DPW also operates traffic signals and intelligent transportation systems, drinking water systems in certain communities, operates five airports, paratransit and fixed route public transport, administers various environment programs, issues various permits for activities in the public roadway, and has a Department Emergency Operations Center that works in conjunction with the County Emergency Operations Center operated by the Sheriff's Department. The department is headquartered at 900 South Fremont Avenue in Alhambra, California.

HQ of Public Works los Angeles

Services are provided primarily to the unincorporated county with some services provided to contract cities. Flood control and watershed management services are provided to all of the county except the Antelope Valley.

As part of its flood control and water supply responsibilities, the Department of Public Works has 15 major dams and 27 spreading grounds in the county. Pacoima Dam is one of the largest owned by Public Works and survived the Northridge earthquake in 1994 intact.

Water from the dams is released into flood-control channels and some is diverted into spreading basins where it percolates into the ground and recharges the groundwater. The surface water is not used directly as it requires more cleaning than groundwater. Near the coast, the department has constructed sea water barriers that use injection wells to create a fresh water barrier to prevent salt water intrusion from the ocean into the groundwater.

The DPW is a leader in watershed management. It provides storm drain education programs, publishes and enforces best management practices for activities that may affect the watershed, and manages watersheds to provide a balance between flood control, recreation, and protecting the natural environment.

== History ==
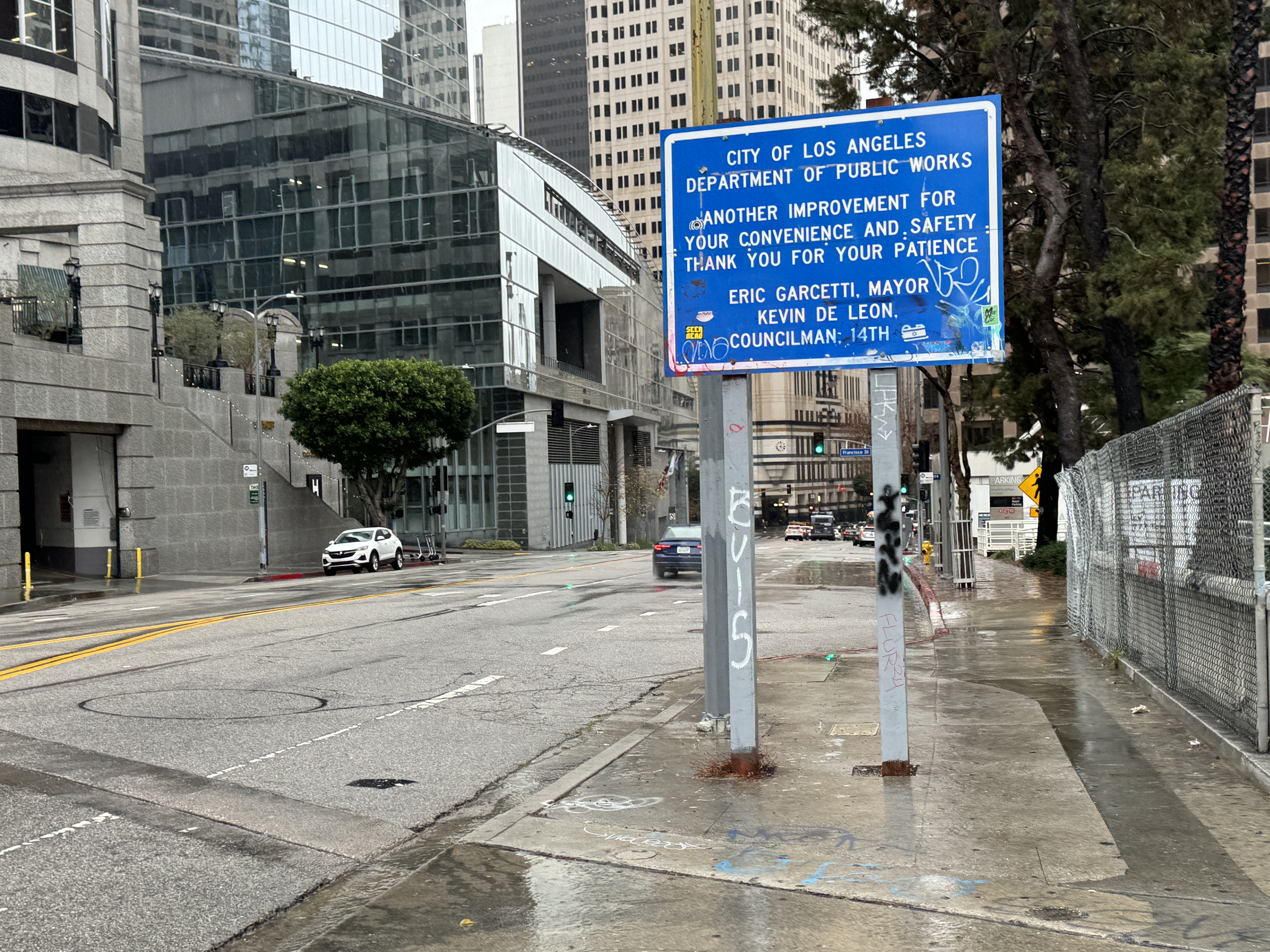
A Los Angeles County Department of Public Works sign along 7th Street in downtown Los Angeles.

The department was formed in 1985 in a consolidation of the county Road Department, the Flood Control District (in charge of dams, spreading grounds, and channels), and the County Engineer (in charge of building safety, land survey, waterworks).

For 25 years, the County Engineer Department was housed in the historic Higgins Building, a 10-story Beaux-Arts style commercial building that was designed and built by noted architect Arthur L. Haley and engineer Albert Carey Martin in 1910, at the corner of Second and Main Streets in Downtown Los Angeles. After "overseeing construction projects large and small from one of the city's strongest buildings, the county determined that the department needed more modern quarters and pulled up stakes in 1977," according to the Los Angeles City Planning Department, which designated the building as the Historic-Cultural Monument #873.

In 1977, the County Engineer Department moved to the corner of 5th Street and Vermont Ave., Los Angeles until the merge of the three departments. At that time the department was called the Department of County Engineer-Facilities.

In 1988, the department issued a demolition permit to tear down the historic Golden Gate Theater in East Los Angeles. Demolition commenced before officials led by then County Supervisor Ed Edelman halted the work with a stop-work order. Demolition crews had already begun to dismantle the walls when Edelman, then Los Angeles City Councilwoman Gloria Molina, sheriff's deputies and more than 50 concerned community members showed up at the site to ensure the demolition work was halted. Edelman blamed a "foul-up" in the Public Works Department for issuing the demolition permit and assured the gathered crowd that heads were going to roll and that he would "try and stop this damn demolition before it happens."

For years, the Flood Control District and the County Road Department were headquartered in buildings at Alcazar Street in East Los Angeles by the Los Angeles County General Hospital.

Major divisions of the Public Works Department were located at various locations in Los Angeles city for a number of years, until the 12-story glass building in Alhambra, California was purchased and refurbished. This tallest structure in Alhambra was formerly the western headquarters of Sears, Roebuck and Company, where some fixture units still bear the label "Sears". The steel frames were strengthened in 2006 after it was learned from the Northridge earthquake that the welded joints were not adequate to withstand a major earthquake.

== Former directors ==
- Thomas A. Tidemanson (1985–1994)
- Harry Stone (1994–2001)
- James Noyes (2001–2004)
- Donald Wolfe (2004–2008)
- Gail Farber (2008–2016)
- Mark Pestrella (2016–present)

== Major divisions ==
- Architectural and Engineering Division – designs various buildings and facilities for other county departments
- Aviation Division – operates the five general aviation airports: Fox Field (Lancaster), Brackett Field (La Verne), Whiteman Airport (Pacoima), Compton/Woodley Airport (Compton), and El Monte Airport (El Monte)
- Administrative Services Division – provides contract support, fleet, procurement and warehousing services for the Department
- Building and Safety Division – regulates construction on private properties
- Business Relations and Contracts Division – consisted of two sections: Contract Section I and Contract Section II
- Construction Division – advertises and awards public contracts and performs inspection, construction management, and environmental compliance during construction of public works projects
- Design Division – designs departmental facilities
- Environmental Programs Division – promotes recycling, and regulates underground storage tanks and industrial waste disposal
- Fiscal Division – The Fiscal Division is responsible for the accounting, cashiering, billing, accounts payable, accounts receivable, cost accounting, and fixed asset property records for the Department of Public Works.
- Fleet Management Division (Fleet) – support Public Works’ operational divisions that provide critical services throughout the unincorporated county and 88 contract cities.
- Flood Maintenance Division – flood protection, water conservation, groundwater recharge, runoff control, and storm-water quality are addressed and provided; along with proactively meeting or exceeding environmental and water quality regulations and standards.
- Geotechnical and Materials Engineering Division – Ensures proper land development from geology and soils engineering to subdivision mapping standards
- Land Development Division – regulates the developments in private lands
- Project Management Division – manages capital project constructions for the County
- Programs Development Division – manages funding programs and operates transit services in the unincorporated County
- Road Maintenance Division – maintains the various streets and roads in the unincorporated portions of the County
- Sewer Maintenance Division – operates and maintains sewers, pumping stations and sewage treatment plants
- Stormwater Engineering Division – handles water conservation, and operates and maintains three seawater barriers
- Stormwater Maintenance Division – operates and maintains dams, open channels, storm drains, debris basins, check dams and pumping plants
- Stormwater Planning Division – handles strategic planning and multi-benefit project development for the Los Angeles County Flood Control District
- Stormwater Quality Division – handles stormwater quality and the National Pollutant Discharge Elimination System Permit Program
- Survey/Mapping and Property Management Division – provides survey services, maintains public land/survey records. Property Management includes title investigations, appraisal, project coordination, right of way engineering and acquisitions and dispositions.
- Traffic and Lighting Division – handles the traffic controls and lights on the streets of the unincorporated portions of the County
- Waterworks Division – provides water services

== Routes ==
=== County Shuttles ===
LACDPW operates shuttles in unincorporated areas of the county, and funds other agencies that provide service.

Route	Terminals		Via	Notes	Schedule
Acton & Agua Dulce Shuttle	Santa Clarita; Santa Clarita station	Acton; Sierra Hwy & Crown Valley Rd	Sierra Hwy	Operates Monday, Wednesday and Saturday	Schedule
Avocado Heights/Bassett/West Valinda Shuttle	Avocado Heights; Don Julian Rd & Avocado Heights Park	Bassett; Sunkist Av & Hayland St	Don Julian Rd	Operates Monday–Saturday	Schedule
Heights Hopper Shuttle	Hacienda Heights; Valencia Av & Palm Av	Rowland Heights; Rowland Heights Park	Colima Rd	Operates Monday–Saturday; Serves Puente Hills Mall	Schedule
East Valinda Shuttle	Valinda; Rimgrove Park	South San Jose Hills; Nogales High School	Azusa Av, Valley Bl	Operates Monday–Saturday	Schedule
Edmund D. Edelman Children's Court Shuttle	Los Angeles; Cal State LA station	Monterey Park; Edmund D. Edelman Children's Court	Campus Rd	Operates Monday–Friday; Fare-free service	Schedule
Topanga Canyon Beach Bus	Warner Center; Warner Center station	Santa Monica; Downtown Santa Monica station	Topanga Canyon Bl	Operates daily; Serves Westfield Topanga	Schedule
Wellness Center Shuttle	Los Angeles; Los Angeles General Medical Center		State St	Operates Monday–Friday; Loop route; Fare-free service	Schedule

=== El Sol ===
El Sol is the shuttle system serving East Los Angeles.

Route	Terminals	Via	Notes	Schedule
Whittier Boulevard/Saybrook Park	East Los Angeles; Dionicio Morales Transit Plaza	Whittier Bl	Serves East LA Civic Center station, Maravilla station and Atlantic station; Counter Clockwise route	Schedule
Union Pacific/Salazar Park	East Los Angeles; Dionicio Morales Transit Plaza	Indiana St	Serves East LA Civic Center station, Maravilla station and Indiana station; Counter Clockwise route	Schedule
City Terrace/ELAC	East Los Angeles; Dionicio Morales Transit Plaza	Cesar Chavez Av	Serves East LA Civic Center station, Cal State LA Transit Center, East Los Angeles College and Atlantic station; Clockwise route	Schedule

=== the Link ===
Route		Terminals		Via	Notes	Schedule
Athens Shuttle		West Athens; 120th St & Western Av		108th St	Serves Los Angeles Southwest College and Vermont/Athens station; Counter Clockwise route	Schedule
Baldwin Hills Parklands Shuttle		Ladera Heights; Kenneth Hahn State Recreation Area		La Cienega Bl	Serves La Cienega/Jefferson station; Clockwise route	Schedule
Florence-Firestone/Walnut Park Shuttle		Florence-Graham; Firestone station		Florence Av	Serves Florence station; Clockwise and Counter Clockwise route	Schedule
King Medical Center Shuttle		Willowbrook; 119th St & Hahn's Shopping Plaza		Willowbrook Av	Serves Willowbrook/Rose Parks Station; Clockwise route	Schedule
Lennox Shuttle		Lennox; Lennox Bl & Firmona Av		104th St	Serves Hawthorne/Lennox station, Intuit Dome and SoFi Stadium; Counter Clockwise route	Schedule
Willowbrook Shuttle	A	Willowbrook; 119th St & Hahn's Shopping Plaza	Willowbrook; San Pedro St & 135th St	El Segundo Bl	Serves Avalon station	Schedule
Willowbrook Shuttle	B	Willowbrook; 119th St & Hahn's Shopping Plaza		Mona Bl	Serves Willowbrook/Rosa Parks station; Clockwise route	Schedule

=== Sunshine Shuttle ===
Sunshine Shuttle is the shuttle system serving South Whittier.

Route	Terminals		Via	Notes	Schedule
A	Whittier; Whittwood Town Center	Whittier; Whittier Bl & Sorenson Av	Painter Av		Schedule
B	Whittier; Whittwood Town Center		Whittier Bl	Clockwise and Counter Clockwise routes	Schedule
C	West Whittier-Los Nietos; Broadway Av & Sorensen Park		Norwalk Bl	Clockwise route	Schedule

== See also ==
- Los Angeles County Department of Public Works dams
- Eaton Wash Reservoir
- Morris Reservoir
