= Diego Rivera Learning Complex =

High school in California, US

Coordinates: 33.9833°N 118.2552°W

Address
- 6100 S Central Avenue Florence-Graham (Los Angeles postal address), California, 90001; United States

District information
- Established: 2011

The Diego Rivera Learning Complex (DRLC) is a high school in Florence-Graham, California, with a Los Angeles postal address. It is a part of the Los Angeles Unified School District. It was formerly known as South Region High School No. 2. It is named after the artist Diego Rivera, and consists of four small schools: Public Service Community School, Communication and Technology (CATS), Green Design, and Performing Arts.

When the school opened in 2011, it relieved Fremont High School and David Starr Jordan High School.

== History ==
Diego Rivera opened in 2011, reducing a high percentage of students who attended Fremont High school, whom switched to Diego Rivera Learning Complex.
