= Spreading ground =

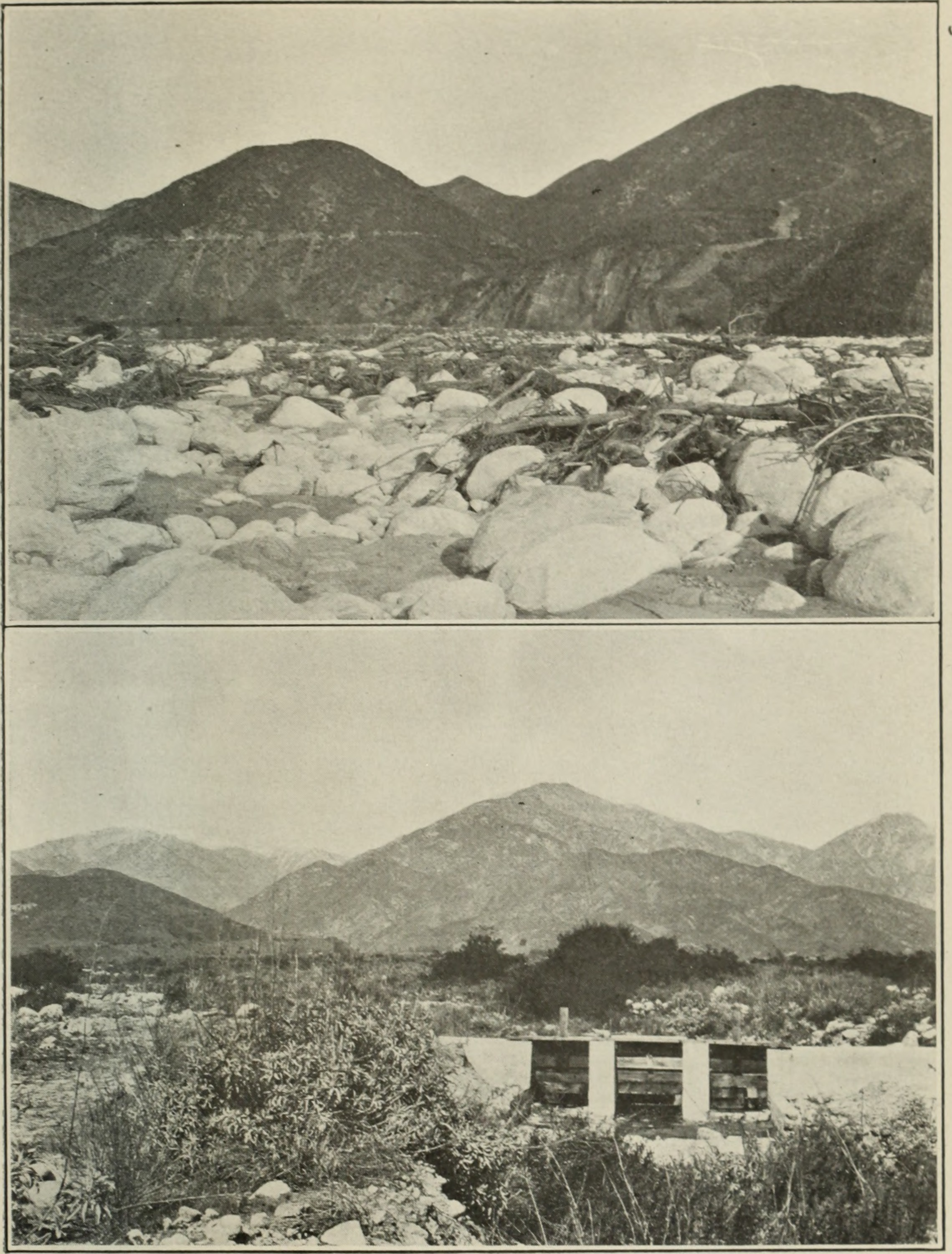
A spreading ground in California, circa 1917

A spreading ground is a water conservation facility that retains surface water long enough for it to percolate into the soil. Spreading grounds must be located where underlying soils are permeable and connected to a target aquifer. Locating them above silt or clay would prevent the surface water from reaching formations that store water.

When natural percolation of precipitation is insufficient to replenish groundwater withdrawn for human use, artificial recharge helps prevent aquifer depletion, subsidence and saltwater intrusion. Spreading grounds are one of several available technologies, and are useful to harness storm water runoff in populated areas with low annual precipitation. For example, Los Angeles County, California has 27 such facilities, and four more operated in conjunction with the Department of Public Works, many of which date to the 1930s.

While managed aquifer recharge (MAR) projects utilizing storm water and diverted surface water runoff augment groundwater recharge, data suggests that the infiltration capacity of spreading grounds in drought-prone regions is underused due to the seasonality of rainfall. In response, interest is being generated around MAR projects that utilize recycled water to supplement other water sources. Orange County's Groundwater Replenishment System serves as an example of one such system that is combining recycled water and storm water to recharge groundwater through spreading grounds to meet the municipality's annual water needs.

Today, many spreading grounds, which were once considered single-purpose facilities, are being converted to combine municipalities' goals for groundwater recharge with demands for additional recreational opportunities, green space and wildlife habitat. The Dominguez Gap Wetlands in Long Beach, California, which consists of two spreading grounds, is an example of one of these multi-purpose facilities. While the facility's east basin was converted into constructed wetlands (Bixby Marshland (?)), the west basin remains a spreading ground that recharges the local aquifer by an estimated 450-acre feet annually.
