= 103rd Street/Watts Towers station =

Light rail station

103rd St/Watts Towers
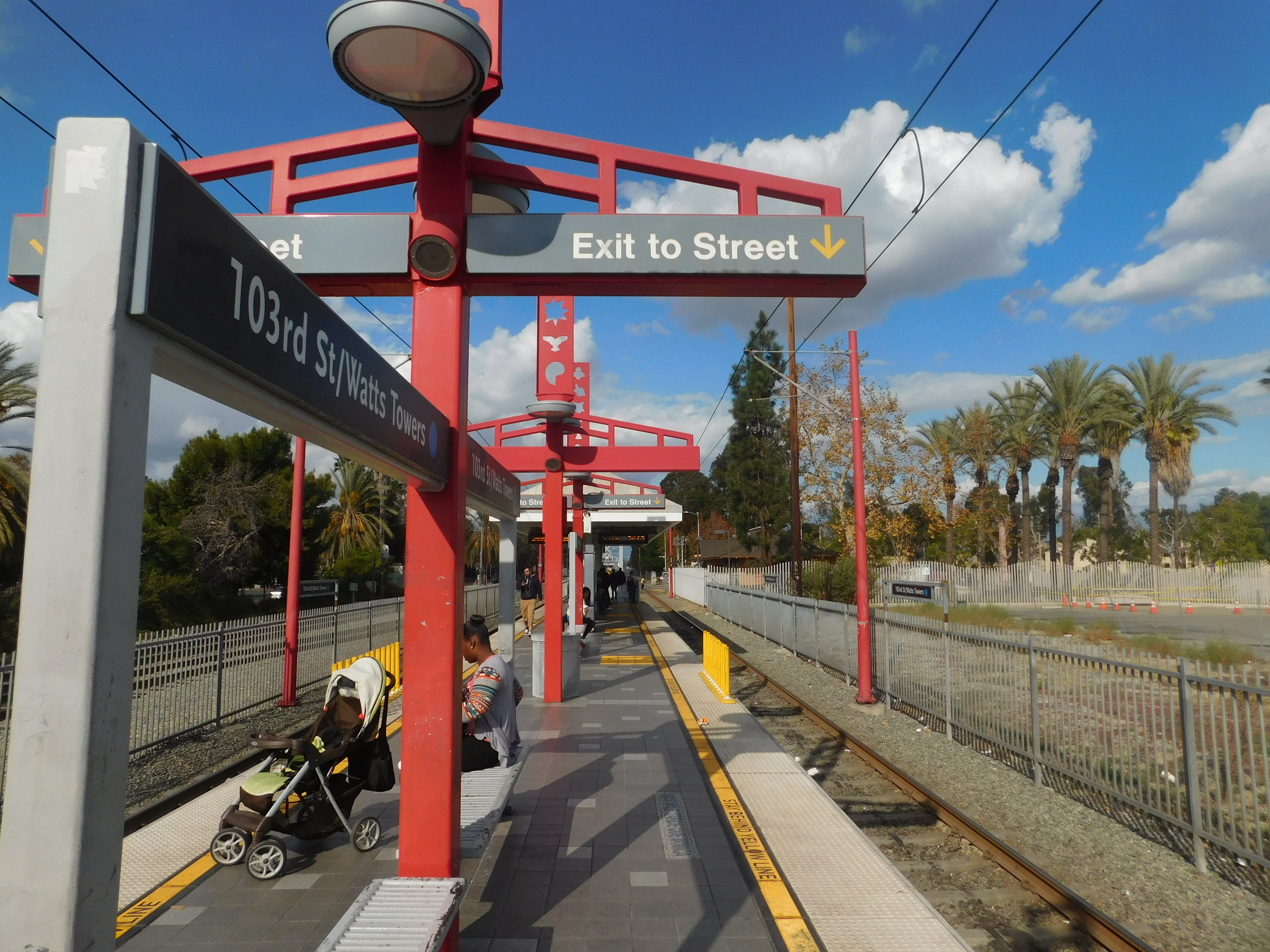
- 103rd Street/Watts Towers station platform in November 2015

General information
- Location: 10100 Grandee Avenue; Los Angeles, California
- Coordinates: 33.9427°N 118.2432°W
- Owner: Los Angeles County Metropolitan Transportation Authority
- Platforms: 1 island platform
- Tracks: 2
- Connections: Los Angeles Metro Bus; LADOT DASH

Construction
- Structure type: At-grade
- Parking: 62 spaces
- Accessible: Yes

History
- Opened: July 14, 1990; 36 years ago
- Rebuilt: November 2, 2019
- Former names: 103rd Street/Kenneth Hahn

Passengers
- FY 2025: 1,889 (avg. wkdy boardings)

Services
Preceding station	Metro Rail	Following station
Willowbrook/Rosa Parks toward Long Beach	A Line	Firestone toward Pomona
Location

103rd Street/Watts Towers station is an at-grade light rail station on the A Line of the Los Angeles Metro Rail system. The station is located alongside the Union Pacific freight railroad's Wilmington Subdivision (the historic route of the Pacific Electric Railway), at its intersection with 103rd Street, after which the station is named, along with the nearby landmark Watts Towers in the Watts neighborhood of Los Angeles, California.

It is adjacent to the Watts Station, which historically served the Watts, Long Beach, and San Pedro lines of the Pacific Electric Railway.

== Service ==
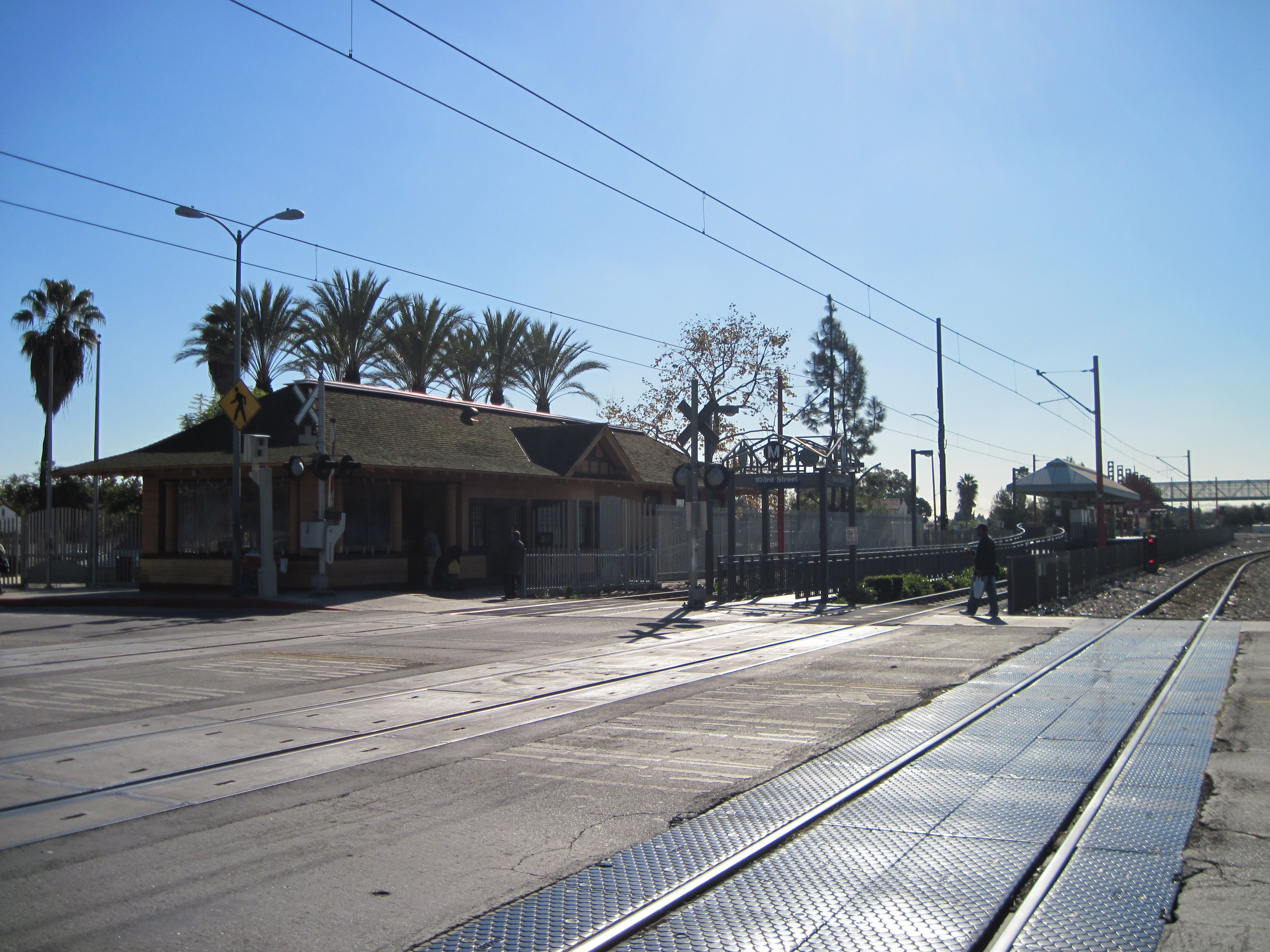
The LA Metro station, adjacent to the historic Watts Station

=== Hours and frequency ===
A Line service hours are from approximately 4:30 a.m. and 11:45 p.m. daily. Trains operate every 8 minutes during peak hours, Monday to Friday. Trains run every 10 minutes, during midday on weekdays and weekends, from 9:00 a.m. to 7:00 p.m. Night and early morning service is approximately every 20 minutes every day.

=== Connections ===
As of December 15, 2024, the following connections are available:

- Los Angeles Metro Bus: 117
- LADOT DASH: Watts
- Metro Micro: Watts/Compton Zone

== Notable places nearby ==
The station is within walking distance of the following notable places:

- Good Shepherd Convalescent Hospital
- Jordan High School
- Jordan Downs
- Verbum Dei High School
- Watts Senior Center
- Watts Station — former Pacific Electric Railway station listed on the National Register of Historic Places
- Watts Towers
