= Watts Station =

Railway station in Los Angeles, California, United States

Watts
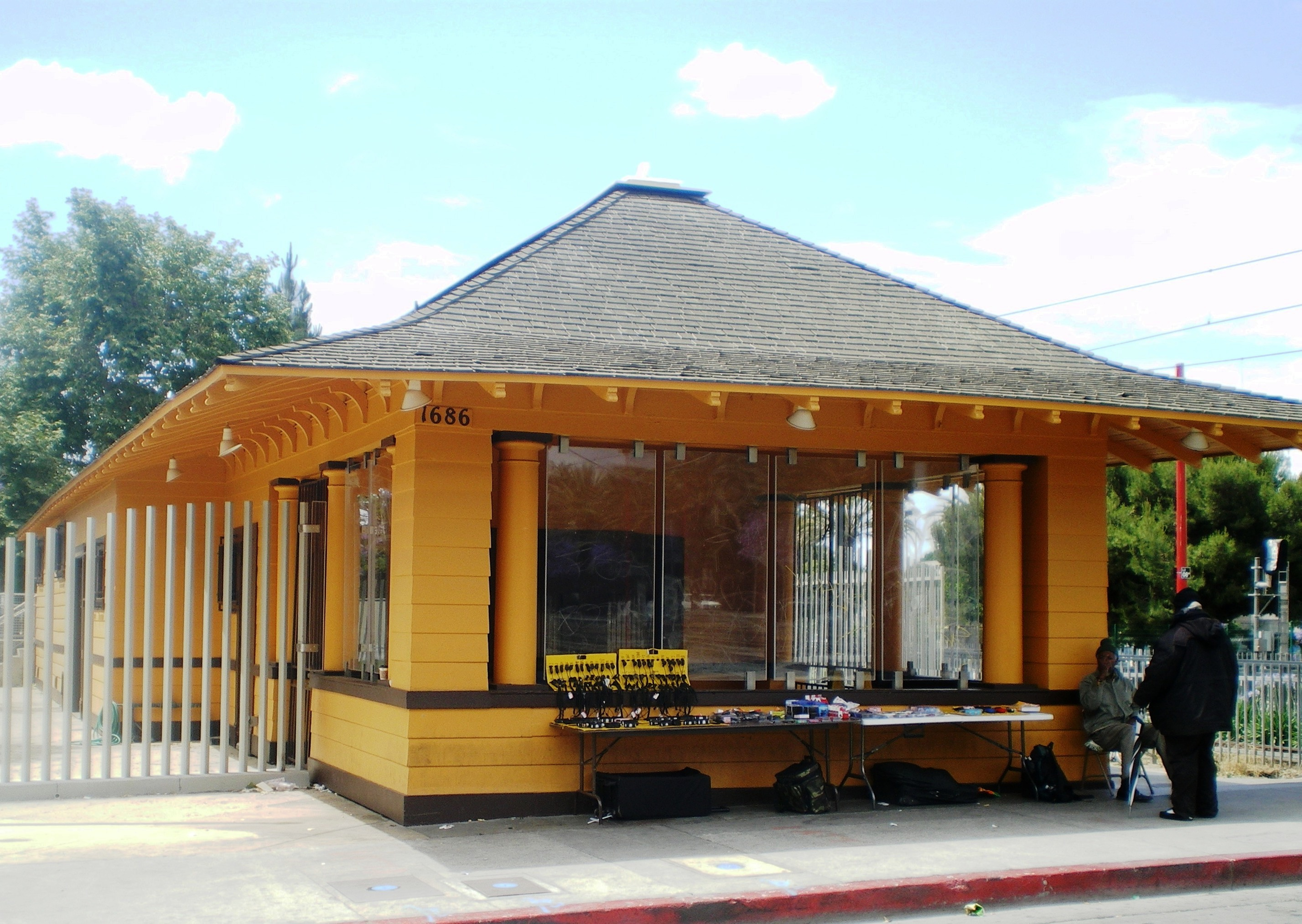
- Watts Station, May 2008

General information
- Location: 1686 E. 103rd Street; Watts, Los Angeles, California
- Tracks: 4

History
- Opened: 1904
- Closed: 1961

Services
Preceding station	Pacific Electric	Following station
Abila toward Morgan Avenue	Long Beach	Latin toward Pacific Electric Building
Abila toward Balboa	Balboa	Latin toward Pacific Electric Building
Abila toward San Pedro	San Pedro via Dominguez	Latin toward Pacific Electric Building
Abila toward San Pedro	San Pedro via Gardena	Latin toward Pacific Electric Building
Palomar toward Santa Ana SP Depot	Santa Ana	Latin toward Pacific Electric Building
Centralia toward Clifton	Redondo Beach via Gardena	Latin toward Pacific Electric Building
Centralia toward El Segundo	Hawthorne–El Segundo	Latin toward Pacific Electric Building
Terminus	Watts; Local	Elcoat toward Pacific Electric Building
- Watts Station
- U.S. National Register of Historic Places
- Los Angeles Historic-Cultural Monument
- Location within Southern Los Angeles Location within the Los Angeles metropolitan area Location within California Location within the United States
- Coordinates: 33°56′35″N 118°14′34.80″W
- Built: 1904
- Architectural style: Late Victorian
- NRHP reference No.: 74000523
- LAHCM No.: 36
- Added to NRHP: March 15, 1974
Location

Watts Station was a train station built in 1904 in Watts, Los Angeles, California. It was one of the first buildings in Watts, and for many years, it was a major stop for the Pacific Electric Railway's "Red Car" service between Los Angeles and Long Beach. It was the only structure that remained intact when stores along 103rd Street in Watts were burned in the 1965 Watts riots. Remaining untouched in the middle of the stretch of street that came to be known as "Charcoal Alley", the station became a symbol of continuity, hope, and renewal for the Watts community. It has since been declared a Los Angeles Historic-Cultural Monument and is listed on the National Register of Historic Places.

== Construction and operation as a Pacific Electric station ==
Watts was built on the old Rancho La Tajauta. In 1902, the family of Charles H. Watts, for whom the community was later named, sought to spur development of the rancho by donating a 10-acre (40,000 m^{2}) site to the Pacific Electric Railway. Watts Station was built on the site in 1904, serving for more than 50 years as a major railway depot and stop for the Pacific Electric's "Red Car" service between Los Angeles and Long Beach. It was located at a major junction, where lines to San Pedro and Santa Ana branched off from the main line to Long Beach. The station is a single-story, 2,200-square-foot (200 m^{2}), wood-frame structure divided into three rooms. It was one of the first buildings erected in Watts and is one of the few remaining from its early years. It also served as a model for later depots built in La Habra, Covina and Glendora.

With the Watts junction connecting the Long Beach–Santa Ana line to the San Pedro–Redondo line, Watts was able to secure a working-class population who depended on the service for travel. This service helped the Watts community to continue to grow, with many of its population traveling outside the Downtown area for work opportunities.

The service in Watts Station also allowed for leisure and enjoyment. The population in Watts were not confined to the boundaries of their neighborhoods but free to enjoy the entertainment offered by distant communities, with many using the system to attend nightclubs and dance halls within the larger urban region.

The building remained an active depot until passenger rail service was discontinued in 1961.

== Effects of discontinuation ==
The end of streetcar service in Watts brought about change in the community. With its closing, Watts Station lost a key form of mass transportation. Many of Watts' low-income residents could also not afford to own automobiles, which were becoming the norm. The spread of employment across Los Angeles and lack of transportation resulted in less employment opportunities and more traveling expenses for the people in Watts.

== History ==
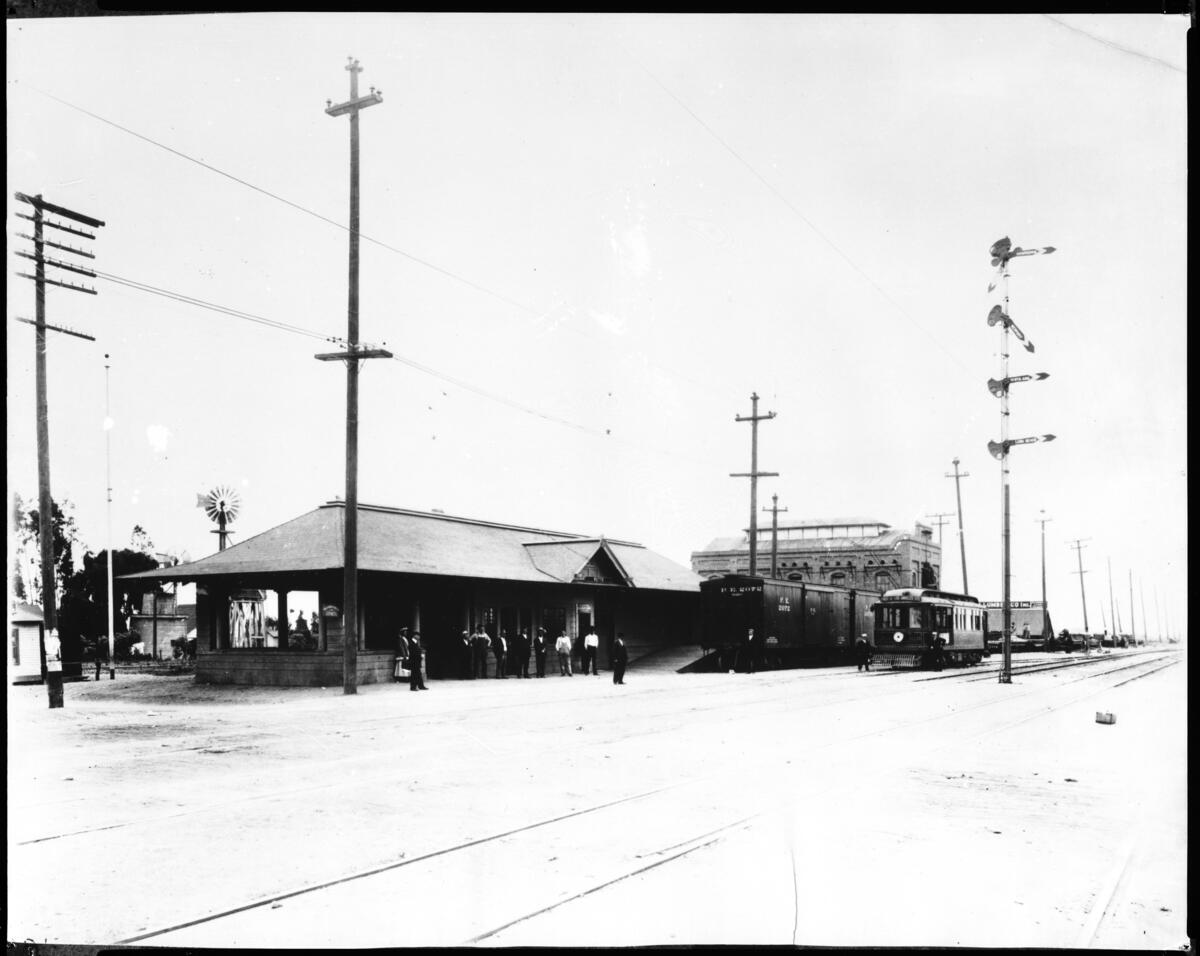
Watts station, c. 1906

Incidents occurring around Watts Station in its early years including the following:

- In 1904, shortly after the station opened, a woman described as "an illiterate Mexican woman" was killed trying to save her six-year-old son who had wandered onto the tracks. She was the first person to die in a train accident at Watts Station, and the Los Angeles Times proclaimed her a heroine who "dashed upon the track" and threw her son out of the path of an oncoming train. The paper also noted: "Children are numerous among the Mexican families who live in the vicinity of Watts Station, and with that childish disregard for danger that marks the age of indiscretion these children play on the tracks of the electric railroad."
- In December 1904, a 40-year-old "maiden lady" living at Watts Station deliberately stepped in front of a rapidly approaching Long Beach "flyer." The Los Angeles Times reported that "when the body was finally removed from under the wheels it was so badly crushed and torn that it could hardly be recognized as that of a human being."
- In May 1905, according to a contemporary account in the Los Angeles Times, a man known as the "Duke of Watts" had been hired by the Pacific Electric to watch over the "village of child-like laborers" at Watts station and protect them from "the ways of a wicked gringo world." The "Duke" became angered when wagons driven by "some of thim [sic] damn dagoes" rolled into the right of way raising a cloud of dust. When confronted by the "Duke," who the Times described as "a beneficent sovereign," the paper reported that "one of the Italians went up in the air, the way they do" and the other Italians "jumped down from their wagons and began gesticulating like crazy men, ringing their arms and howling like agitated monkey." The Italians claimed the Duke pulled a large pistol on them and forced them to leave Watts.
- In July 1905, Jose Bustos, "a Mexican employed by the Pacific Electric railway" was struck and almost instantly killed by a Long Beach car at Watts station. After exiting a train, "intending to go to the Mexican camp," he was struck while crossing the south bound tracks. Another Mexican laborer, C. Medal, sustained fatal injuries after being struck by a train at Watts Station six months later. And in December 1906, a motorman, Charles Vaughn, was pinched between two cars at Watts Station, suffering possibly fatal injuries.
- In January 1906, a shooting at Watts Station shocked passengers. A woman named Mrs. Henry Welsh, while in the midst of divorce proceedings, drew a revolver and shot at her husband, who was waiting for the train. When her husband grabbed the gun, Mrs. Welsh walked to her husband's pool room near the station where she "smashed in the windows and generally demolished things." She then secured another revolver and returned to the station, firing two more shots at her husband. Both shots missed her husband and went into a waiting car, sending passengers into a panic.
- In August 1919, a group of ex-employees of Pacific Electric attacked a train car at the Watts Station, breaking windows and throwing stones. When A. W. Moon, a Pacific Electric guard, tried to defend the derailed car, he was arrested and charged with "fighting and threatening to fight." The crowd followed the guard to the Watts jail, jeering at him, "calling him opprobrious names," and threatening him. At his trial, it was alleged that the crowd cried, "String them up," prompting Mr. Moon's attorney to request that the case be moved to a venue out of Watts.

== Symbol of hope along "Charcoal Alley" ==
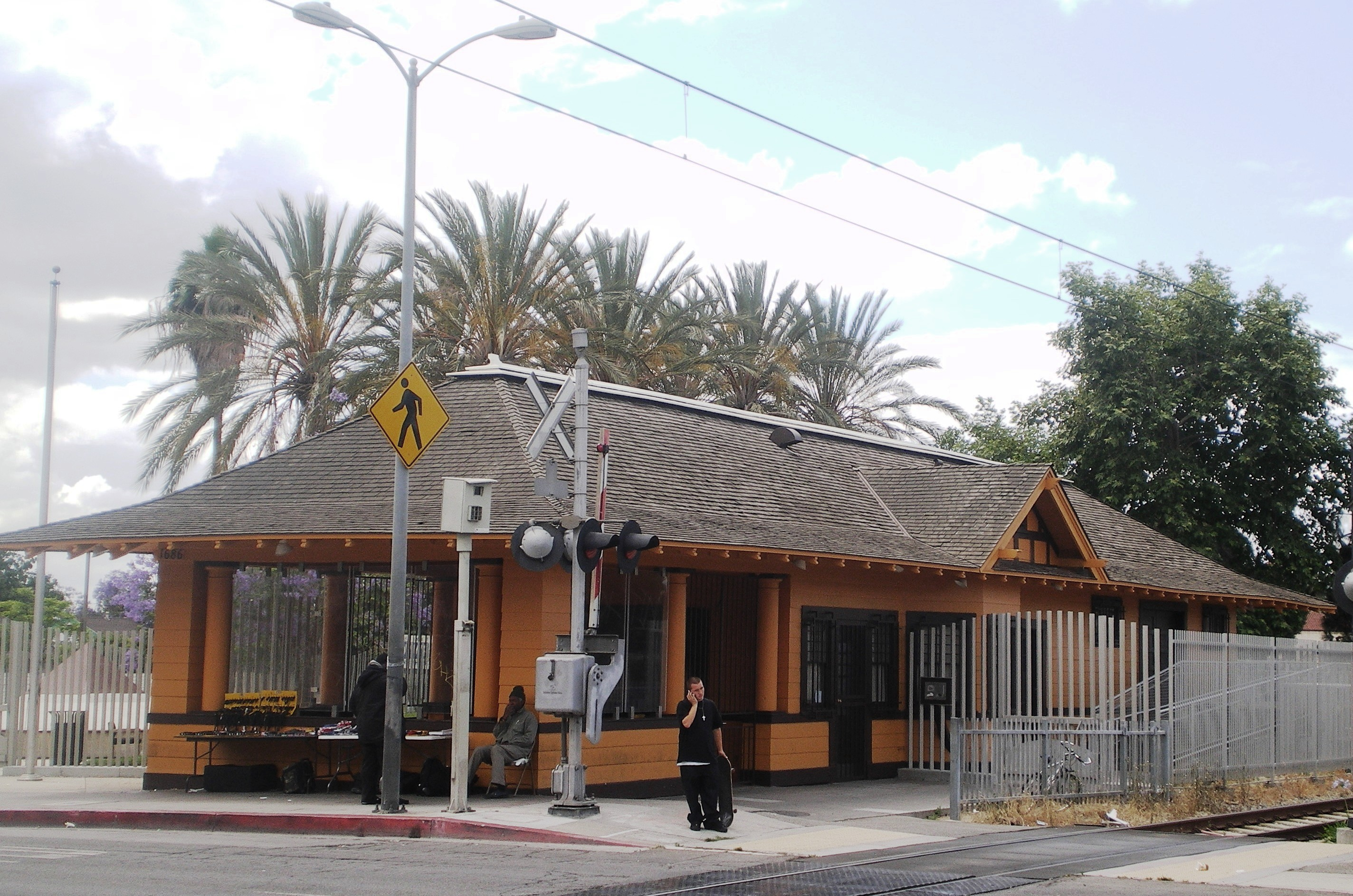
View of Watts Station from tracks

In August 1965, the Watts Riots resulted in the destruction of buildings up and down 103rd Street—the main commercial thoroughfare in Watts. Watts Station was situated in the center of the one-mile (1.6 km) stretch of 103rd Street between Compton and Wilmington Avenue that came to be known as "Charcoal Alley" due to the widespread destruction. One observer recalled: "Both sides of 103rd Street were ablaze now. The thoroughfare was a sea of flames that emitted heat so unbearable that I believed my skin was being seared off." Another account of the riots along "Charcoal Alley" states: "On the third day of the Watts Riots, 103rd St. was burned to the ground." In the middle of the rubble and widespread destruction along "Charcoal Alley", the Los Angeles Times reported that "the train station was the only structure that remained intact when stores along 103rd Street burned during the Watts riots." The survival of the old wood-framed Watts Station, whether an intentional omission or a mere coincidence, resulted in the station becoming, as the Los Angeles Times put it, "a symbol of continuity, hope and renewal" for the Watts community.

== Historic designation and restoration ==
Four months after the riots, the station was declared a Historic-Cultural Monument (HCM #36) by the Los Angeles Cultural Heritage Commission. It was also listed on the National Register of Historic Places in 1974. In the 1980s, after the station had been vacant for many years, the Community Redevelopment Agency spent $700,000 to restore the structure to its original exterior design. The station was re-opened in 1989 as a customer service office for the Los Angeles Department of Water and Power and a small museum of Watts history. Mayor Tom Bradley attended the dedication ceremony and said: "Those days of glory are going to return, and we are going to be at the heart of the action right here at the Watts train station."

In 1990, the Metro Blue Line resumed train service from Los Angeles to Long Beach along the old Pacific Electric right of way. Though the old Watts Station does not serve as a passenger platform or ticket booth for the new Blue Line, the trains do stop at the 103rd Street/Watts Towers Metro Rail station, on 103rd Street, at a location next to the old station.

== Watts Station in popular culture ==
- The 1978 film Killer of Sheep briefly shows small children playing around the Watts Station and abandoned railways.
- Artist Roberto Salas paid tribute to the Red Cars in Watts Station in his public art piece Blue Line Totems in Red.

== See also ==
- List of Los Angeles Historic-Cultural Monuments in South Los Angeles
- List of Registered Historic Places in Los Angeles
