= Florence-Graham, California =

Census-designated place in Los Angeles County, California, United States

Florence-Graham, California Florence-Firestone, California
- Unincorporated community Census designated place
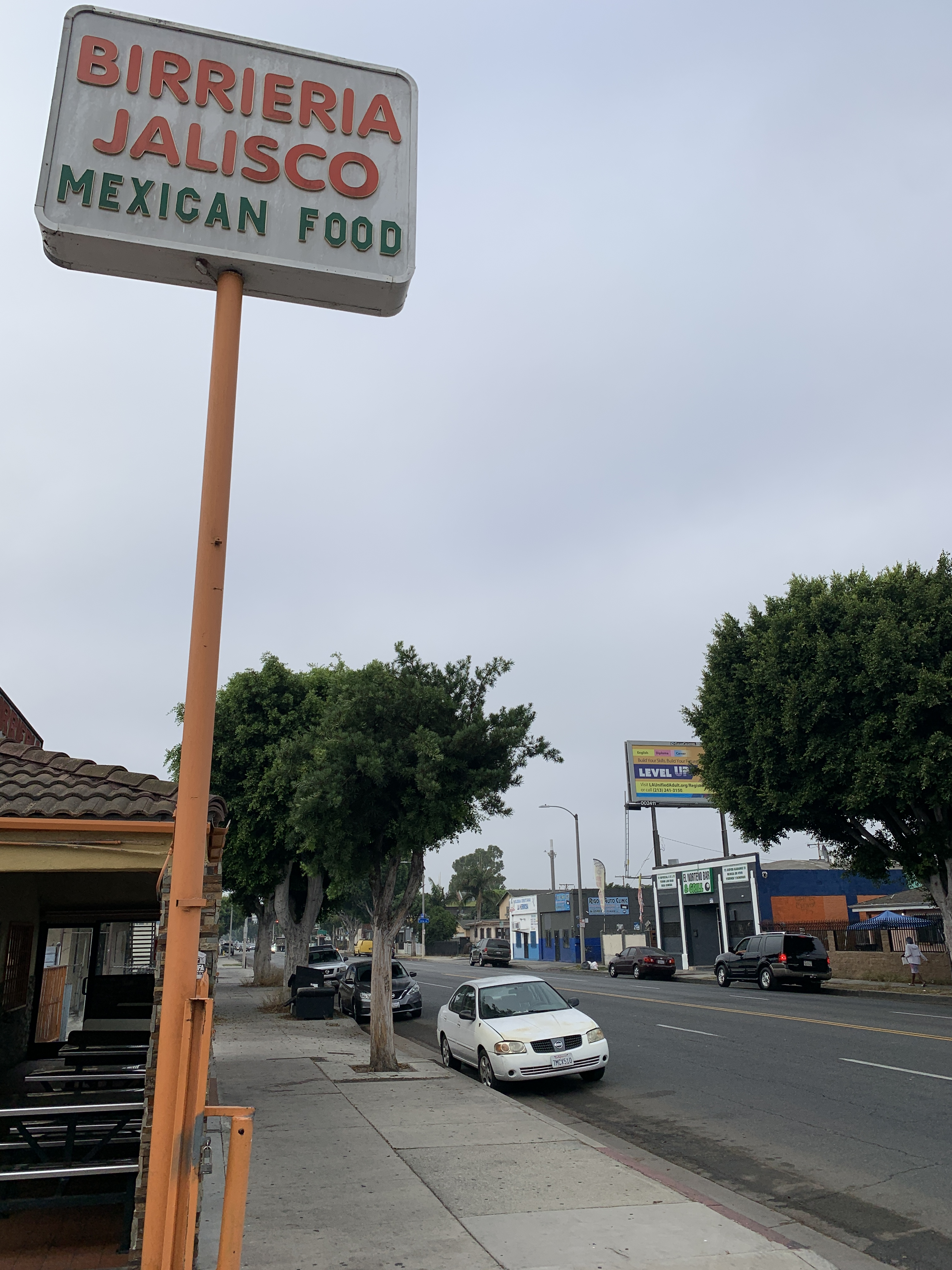
- View along Compton Avenue, August 2022
- Interactive map of Florence-Graham, California
- Location in the United States
- Coordinates: 33°58′10″N 118°14′38″W
- Country: United States
- State: California
- County: Los Angeles

Area
  - Total: 3.509 sq mi (9.089 km^{2})
  - Land: 3.509 sq mi (9.089 km^{2})
  - Water: 0 sq mi (0 km^{2}) 0%
- Elevation: 144 ft (44 m)

Population (April 1, 2020)
  - Total: 61,983
  - Density: 17,660/sq mi (6,820/km^{2})
- Time zone: UTC-8 (Pacific)
  - Summer (DST): UTC-7 (PDT)
- ZIP code: 90001
- Area code: 323
- FIPS code: 06-24477
- GNIS feature ID: 2408218

Florence-Graham (also known as Florence-Firestone) is a census-designated place in Los Angeles County, California, United States. The population was 61,983 at the 2020 census, down from 63,387 at the 2010 census. The census area includes the communities of Florence, Firestone Park, and Graham. It is located in the south central region of Los Angeles County. The neighboring communities are Central-Alameda, Florence, Green Meadows, Lynwood, Vernon, Walnut Park, Watts, and Compton.

== Geography ==
Florence-Graham is located at 33°58′10″N 118°14′38″W.

According to the United States Census Bureau, the CDP has a total area of 3.5 square miles (9.1 km^{2}), all land.

== Demographics ==
Historical population
Census	Pop.	Note	%±
1960	38,164		—
1970	42,895		12.4%
1980	48,662		13.4%
1990	57,147		17.4%
2000	60,197		5.3%
2010	63,387		5.3%
2020	61,983		−2.2%
U.S. Decennial Census; 1860–1870 1880-1890; 1900 1910 1920; 1930 1940 1950; 1960 1970 1980; 1990 2000 2010; 2020

Florence-Graham first appeared as an unincorporated place in the 1960 U.S. census as part of the Southeast census county division; and as a census designated place in the 1980 United States census.

=== Racial and ethnic composition ===
Florence-Graham CDP, California – Racial and ethnic composition Note: the US Census treats Hispanic/Latino as an ethnic category. This table excludes Latinos from the racial categories and assigns them to a separate category. Hispanics/Latinos may be of any race.
Race / Ethnicity (NH = Non-Hispanic)	Pop 2000	Pop 2010	Pop 2020	% 2000	% 2010	% 2020
White alone (NH)	587	422	619	0.98%	0.67%	1.00%
Black or African American alone (NH)	7,624	5,517	4,149	12.67%	8.70%	6.69%
Native American or Alaska Native alone (NH)	60	50	82	0.10%	0.08%	0.13%
Asian alone (NH)	31	91	185	0.05%	0.14%	0.30%
Native Hawaiian or Pacific Islander alone (NH)	10	9	8	0.02%	0.01%	0.01%
Other race alone (NH)	33	99	289	0.05%	0.16%	0.47%
Mixed race or Multiracial (NH)	140	133	351	0.23%	0.21%	0.57%
Hispanic or Latino (any race)	51,712	57,066	56,300	85.90%	90.03%	90.83%
Total	60,197	63,387	61,983	100.00%	100.00%	100.00%

=== 2020 census ===
As of the 2020 census, Florence-Graham had a population of 61,983 and a population density of 17,664.0 inhabitants per square mile (6,820.1/km^{2}). All residents lived in urban areas; none lived in rural areas.

The census reported that 99.2% of the population lived in households, 0.8% lived in non-institutionalized group quarters, and 0.1% were institutionalized.

There were 14,563 households, of which 56.2% had children under the age of 18 living in them. Of all households, 44.8% were married-couple households, 10.0% were cohabiting couple households, 17.1% were households with a male householder and no spouse or partner present, and 28.1% were households with a female householder and no spouse or partner present. About 10.5% of all households were made up of individuals and 3.4% had someone living alone who was 65 years of age or older. The average household size was 4.22. There were 12,486 families (85.7% of households).

The age distribution was 29.4% under the age of 18, 11.9% aged 18 to 24, 29.1% aged 25 to 44, 21.6% aged 45 to 64, and 8.0% who were 65 years of age or older. The median age was 30.4 years. For every 100 females, there were 99.2 males, and for every 100 females age 18 and over, there were 96.7 males age 18 and over.

There were 14,975 housing units at an average density of 4,267.6 units per square mile (1,647.7 units/km^{2}), of which 14,563 (97.2%) were occupied. Of these, 36.4% were owner-occupied, and 63.6% were occupied by renters. The homeowner vacancy rate was 0.8% and the rental vacancy rate was 1.9%.

Racial composition as of the 2020 census
Race	Number	Percent
White	7,014	11.3%
Black or African American	4,338	7.0%
American Indian and Alaska Native	1,452	2.3%
Asian	261	0.4%
Native Hawaiian and Other Pacific Islander	23	0.0%
Some other race	39,138	63.1%
Two or more races	9,757	15.7%
Hispanic or Latino (of any race)	56,300	90.8%

=== 2023 American Community Survey ===
In 2023, the US Census Bureau estimated that 40.7% of the population were foreign-born. Of all people aged 5 or older, 14.6% spoke only English at home, 85.1% spoke Spanish, 0.2% spoke other Indo-European languages, 0.1% spoke Asian or Pacific Islander languages, and 0.0% spoke other languages. Of those aged 25 or older, 47.9% were high school graduates and 7.5% had a bachelor's degree.

The median household income was $61,216, and the per capita income was $18,844. About 17.8% of families and 21.4% of the population were below the poverty line.

=== 2010 census ===
At the 2010 census, Florence-Graham had a population of 63,387. The population density was 17,704.2 inhabitants per square mile (6,835.6/km^{2}). The racial makeup of Florence-Graham was 23,896 (37.8%) white (0.7% non-Hispanic white), 5,862 (9.3%) African American, 498 (0.8%) Native American, 150 (0.2%) Asian, 25 (0.0%) Pacific Islander, 30,704 (48.4%) from other races, and 2,254 (3.6%) from two or more races. Hispanic or Latino of any race were 57,066 persons (90.0%).

The census reported that 63,317 people (99.9% of the population) lived in households, 70 (0.1%) lived in non-institutionalized group quarters, and no one was institutionalized.

There were 13,900 households, 9,191 (66.1%) had children under the age of 18 living in them, 7,058 (50.8%) were opposite-sex married couples living together, 3,459 (24.9%) had a female householder with no husband present, 1,665 (12.0%) had a male householder with no wife present. There were 1,405 (10.1%) unmarried opposite-sex partnerships, and 84 (0.6%) same-sex married couples or partnerships. 1,178 households (8.5%) were one person and 421 (3.0%) had someone living alone who was 65 or older. The average household size was 4.56. There were 12,182 families (87.6% of households); the average family size was 4.63.

The population was spread out, with 22,198 people (35.0%) under the age of 18, 7,990 people (12.6%) aged 18 to 24, 18,758 people (29.6%) aged 25 to 44, 11,020 people (17.4%) aged 45 to 64, and 3,421 people (5.4%) who were 65 or older. The median age was 26.3 years. For every 100 females, there were 100.2 males. For every 100 females aged 18 and over, there were 99.2 males.

There were 14,765 housing units at an average density of 4,123.9 per square mile, of the occupied units 5,101 (36.7%) were owner-occupied and 8,799 (63.3%) were rented. The homeowner vacancy rate was 2.9%; the rental vacancy rate was 4.5%. 25,014 people (39.5% of the population) lived in owner-occupied housing units and 38,303 people (60.4%) lived in rental housing units.

According to the 2010 United States Census, Florence-Graham had a median household income of $35,543, with 30.7% of the population living below the federal poverty line.

== Education ==
=== Primary and secondary schools ===
Florence-Graham residents are zoned to Los Angeles Unified School District schools.

Zoned elementary schools within the CDP include:

- Russell Elementary School
- Florence Avenue Elementary School
- Graham Elementary School
- Lillian St. Elementary School
- Miramonte Elementary School
- Parmelee Elementary School

Zoned middle schools within the CDP include:

- Charles Drew Middle School
- Thomas A. Edison Middle School
- Kory Hunter Middle School

Diego Rivera Learning Complex, a high school, is in the CDP.

Residents are zoned to John C. Fremont High School in Los Angeles. Other sections are zoned to Jordan High School in Los Angeles.

The Roman Catholic Archdiocese of Los Angeles operates the St. Aloysius School (PK, 1–8) and the St. Malachy School (K-8) in Florence-Graham.

=== Public libraries ===
County of Los Angeles Public Library operates the Florence Library and the Graham Library.

The Florence Library opened in 1914 at the residence of Fred W. Cleland. On June 30, 1915, the library moved to Florence Avenue Elementary School. In 1920 the library moved to a building with a converted stable. The library moved to another location in 1924. In 1931-1932 the library moved to a storefront location. In 1964 the storefront was refurbished to mark the 50th anniversary of the library. The library was refurbished beginning in 2001, and it reopened in 2002. In 2019 the original library was demolished and a new one was opened on Compton & Nadeau in 2023

The Graham Library opened in April 1915 in a school. Two years later the library moved to a store building. In 1928 the library moved to another building. In 1938 the library moved another time. The current location was built in 1969. The library was refurbished beginning in May 2000. The library reopened in November 2001 and was rededicated on the 8th of that month. The library has murals from the Bolivian artist Mario Cespedes.

== Government ==
In the California State Legislature, Florence-Graham is in the 33rd senatorial district, represented by Democrat Lena Gonzalez, and in the 57th Assembly district, represented by Democrat Sade Elhawary.

In the United States House of Representatives, Florence-Graham is in California's 42nd congressional district, represented by Democrat Robert Garcia.

== Infrastructure ==
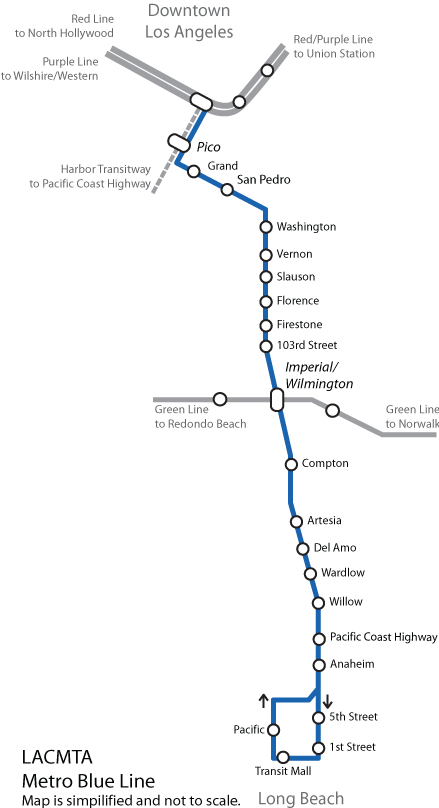
LA Metro A-Line, which serves the area

Fire protection in the CDP is provided by the Los Angeles County Fire Department with ambulance transport by Care Ambulance Service.

The Los Angeles County Sheriff's Department (LASD) operates the Century Station in Lynwood, serving the CDP.

The Los Angeles County Department of Health Services operates the South Health Center in Los Angeles, serving the CDP.

Transit is provided by LA county with "The Link" and the LA Metro with busses and the A Line train with stops on Slauson, Florence, and Firestone.

== Parks and recreation ==
Mary M. Bethune Park, operated by the county, is within the CDP. The park includes a baseball/softball field, a basketball court, children's play areas, a community recreation room, a gymnasium, a multi-purpose field, picnic tables and barbecue grills, a skateboard park, a swimming pool, and toilets.

Franklin D. Roosevelt Park, also operated by the county, is within the CDP. In terms of county facilities it is among the oldest; the construction of the park was authorized by President of the United States Franklin D. Roosevelt as part of the Works Progress Administration projects during the Great Depression. The park has basketball courts, children's play areas, a community room, a computer center, a fitness zone, a gymnasium, picnic shelters, a senior center, a soccer field, a swimming pool, a skateboard park and tennis courts.

Colonel Leon H. Washington Park, another county park, is within the CDP. The 13.2-acre (5.3 ha) park is located on a plot of land that was formerly a lumber yard. It was named after Colonel Leon H. Washington, the founder of The Eastside Shopper (now The Sentinel). The facility has a children's play area, a community recreation center, a computer room, gymnasium, picnic areas with barbecue grills, a swimming pool, tennis courts, and toilets.

The 27-acre (11 ha) Ted Watkins Memorial Park, a county park, is within the CDP. The park, which is one of many contributions from Watts Labor Community Action Committee (WLCAC) was named after Ted Watkins, the founder of the WLCAC, in 1995. The park has lighted baseball/softball fields, a children's play area, a community recreation room, a computer lab, a gymnasium with a stage, picnic areas, a skateboard park, a soccer (football) field, a swimming pool, tennis courts, and toilets.
