= Fitzhugh & Byron =

American architectural firm

Fitzhugh & Byron was an architectural partnership in Phoenix, Arizona, whose partners were Lee Mason Fitzhugh (1877–1937) and Lester A. Byron (1889–1963). The firm, along with architect Henry Trost in Tucson and George Washington Smith in Ajo, Arizona, is credited with the adobe style revival in the state.

The firm was established in 1910, when architect Thornton Fitzhugh returned to Los Angeles, leaving his brother, Lee Fitzhugh, in change of the office. Fitzhugh & Fitzhugh, architects, was the result.

A number of its works are listed on the U.S. National Register of Historic Places.

== Architectural works ==
- J. W. Walker Building, 10 N. 3rd Ave. & 300 W. Washington St., Phoenix (1920)
- Valley Field Riding and Polo Club, 2530 N. 64th St., Scottsdale (1924)
- Rancho Joaquina (J. E. Thompson House), 4630 E. Cheery Lynn Rd., Phoenix (1924)
- Craig Mansion, 131 E. Country Club Dr., Phoenix (1925)
- Dunbar School, 707 W. Grant St., Phoenix, (1925)
- First Church of Christ Scientist, 924 N. First St., Phoenix (1925)
- Phoenix Union Colored High School, 415 E. Grant St., Phoenix (1925–26)
- Welnick Grocery Arcade, 345 W. Van Buren St., Phoenix, (1925–26)
- Clark Memorial Clubhouse, 19 N. 9th St., Clarksdale (1926)
- Clarkdale High School, 849 Main St., Clarkdale (1927–28)
- First Baptist Church, 302 W. Monroe St., Phoenix (1928–29)
- First M. E. Church, 7102 N. 58th Dr., Glendale (1928)
- Lois Grunow Memorial Clinic, 926 E. McDowell, Phoenix (1930)
- August Grunow Residence, 124 E. Palm Ln., Phoenix (1930)
- Cline R. Asbury House, 7801 N. Central Ave., Phoenix (1934)

== Gallery ==
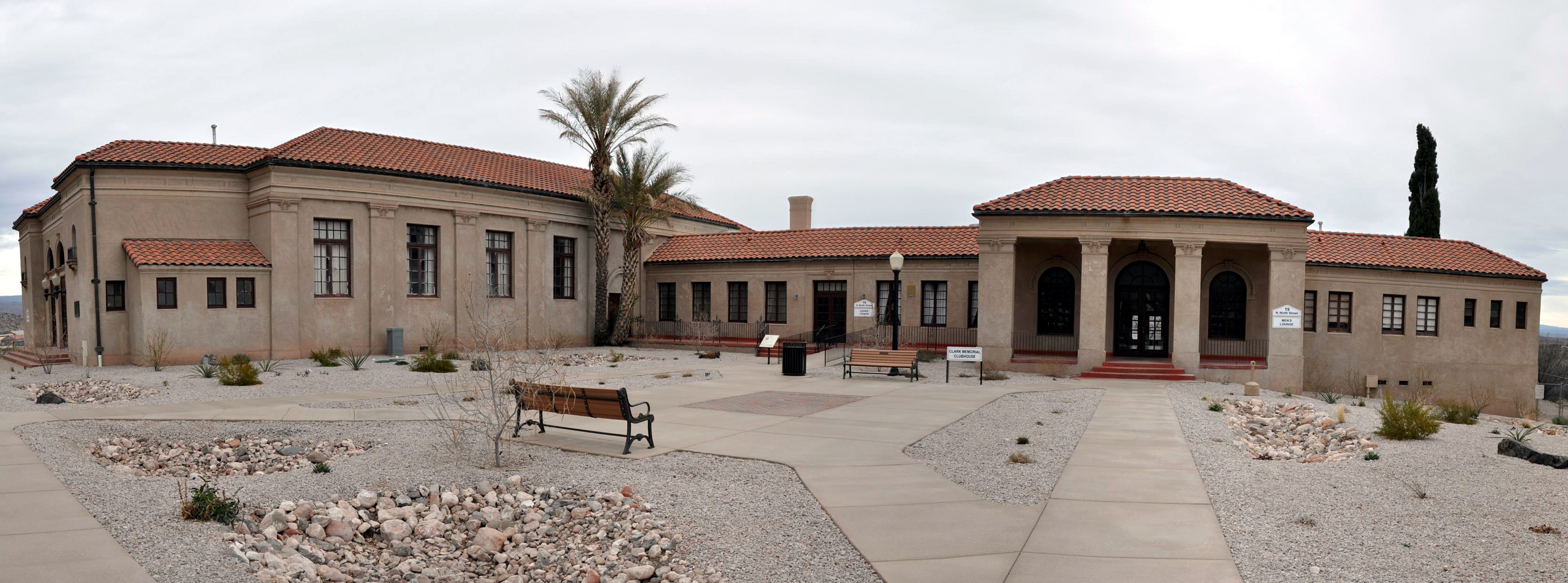
Clark Memorial Clubhouse

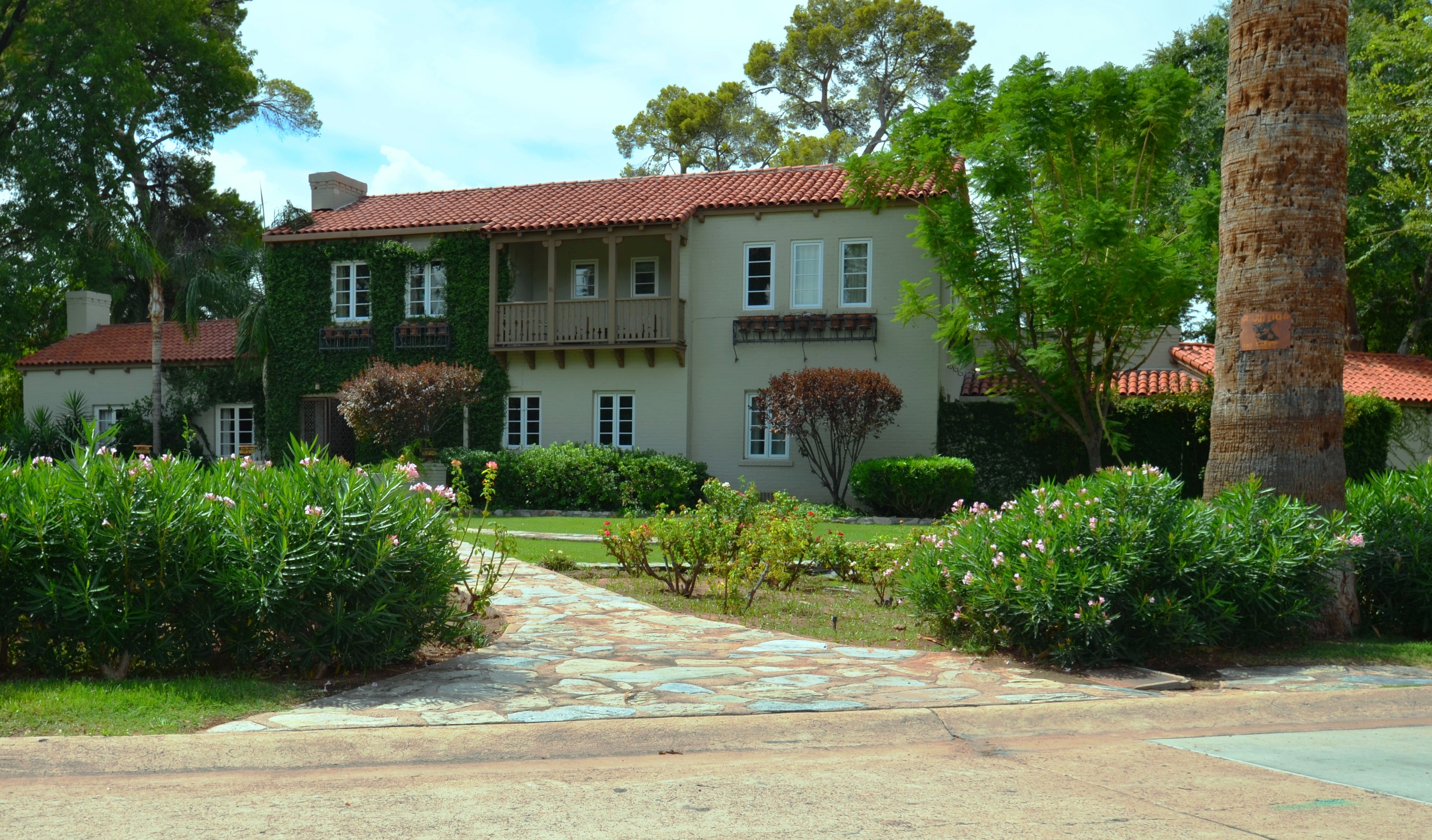
Craig Mansion

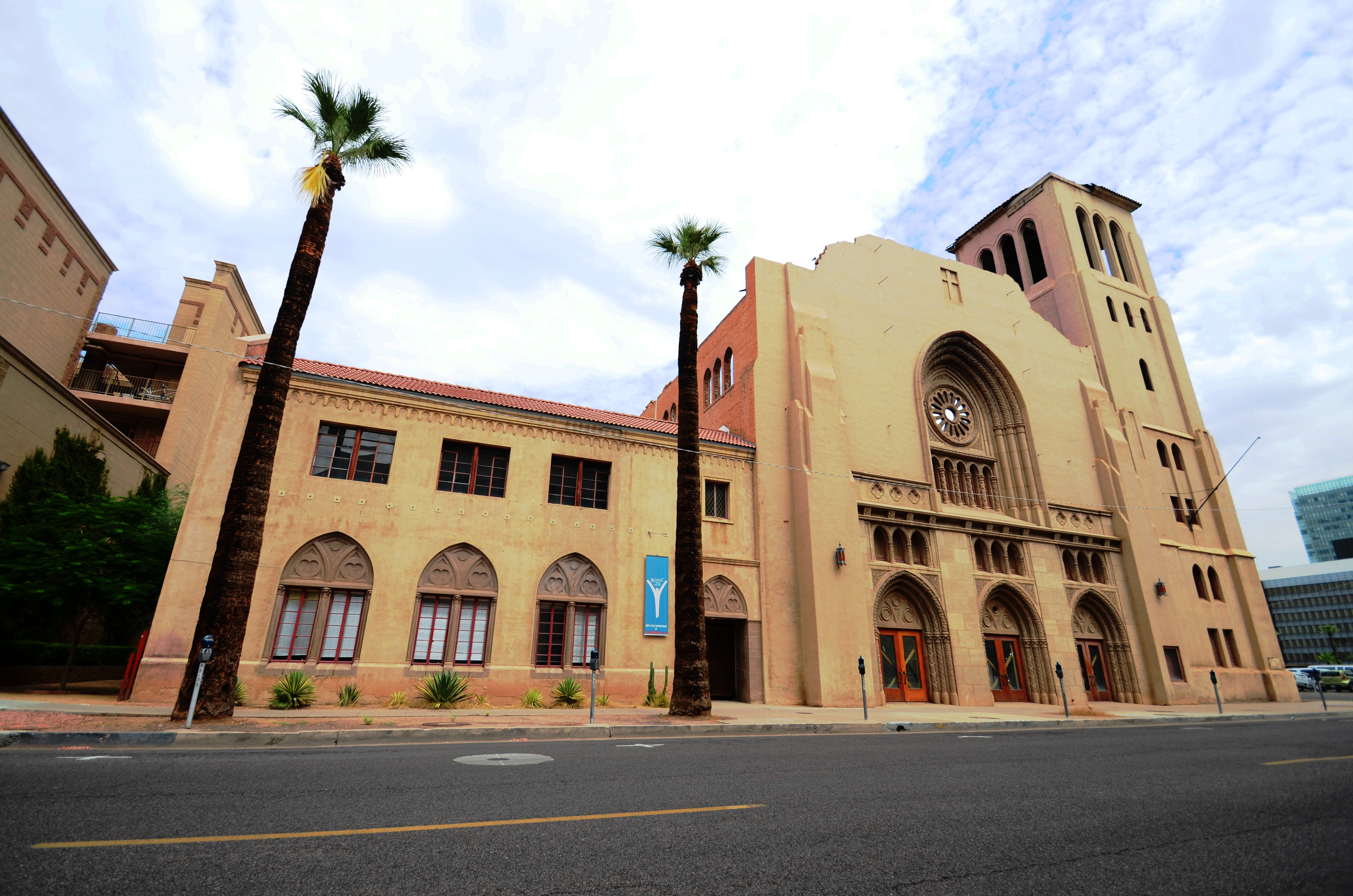
First Baptist Church, Phoenix

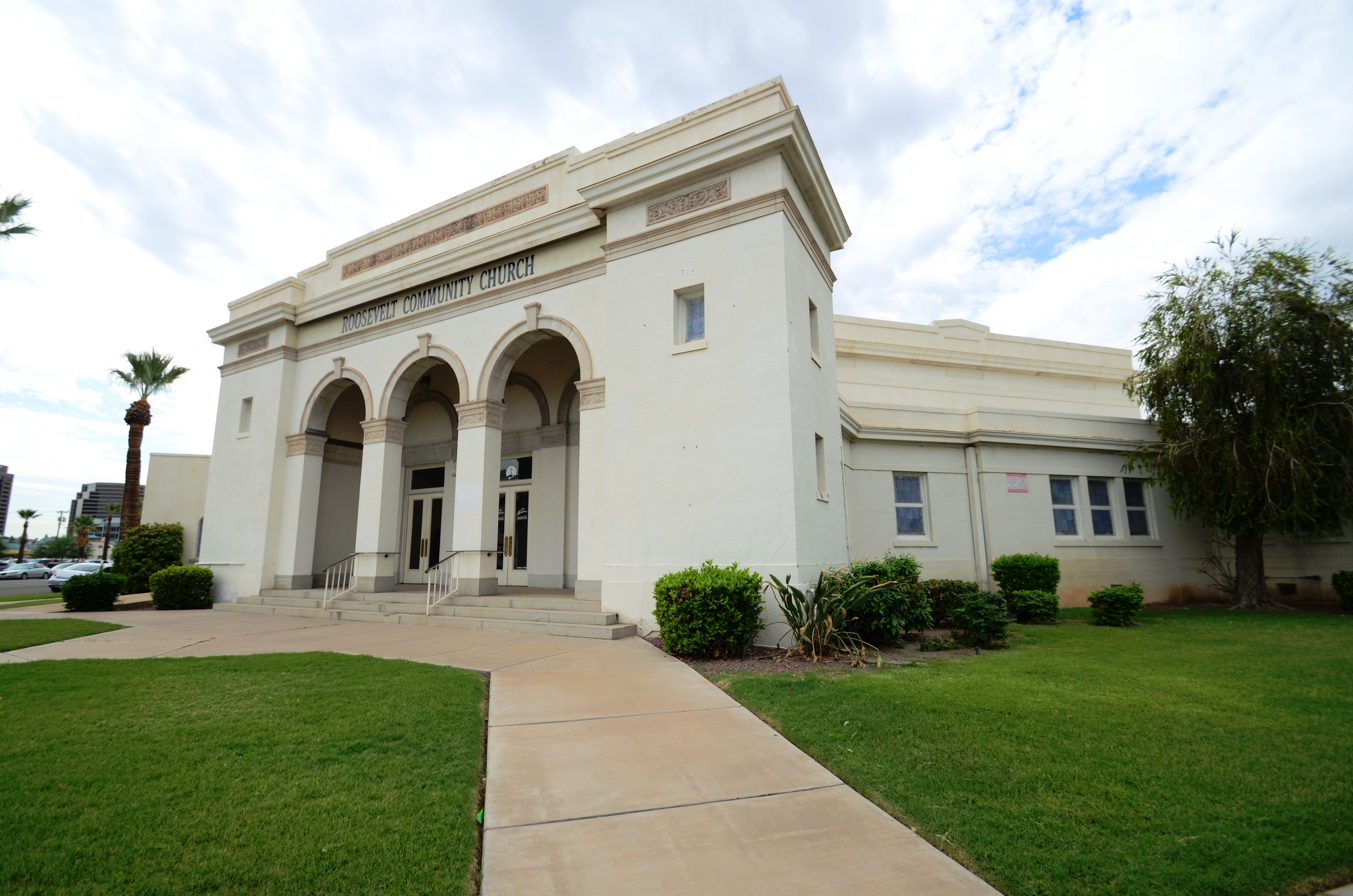
First Church of Christ Scientist, Phoenix

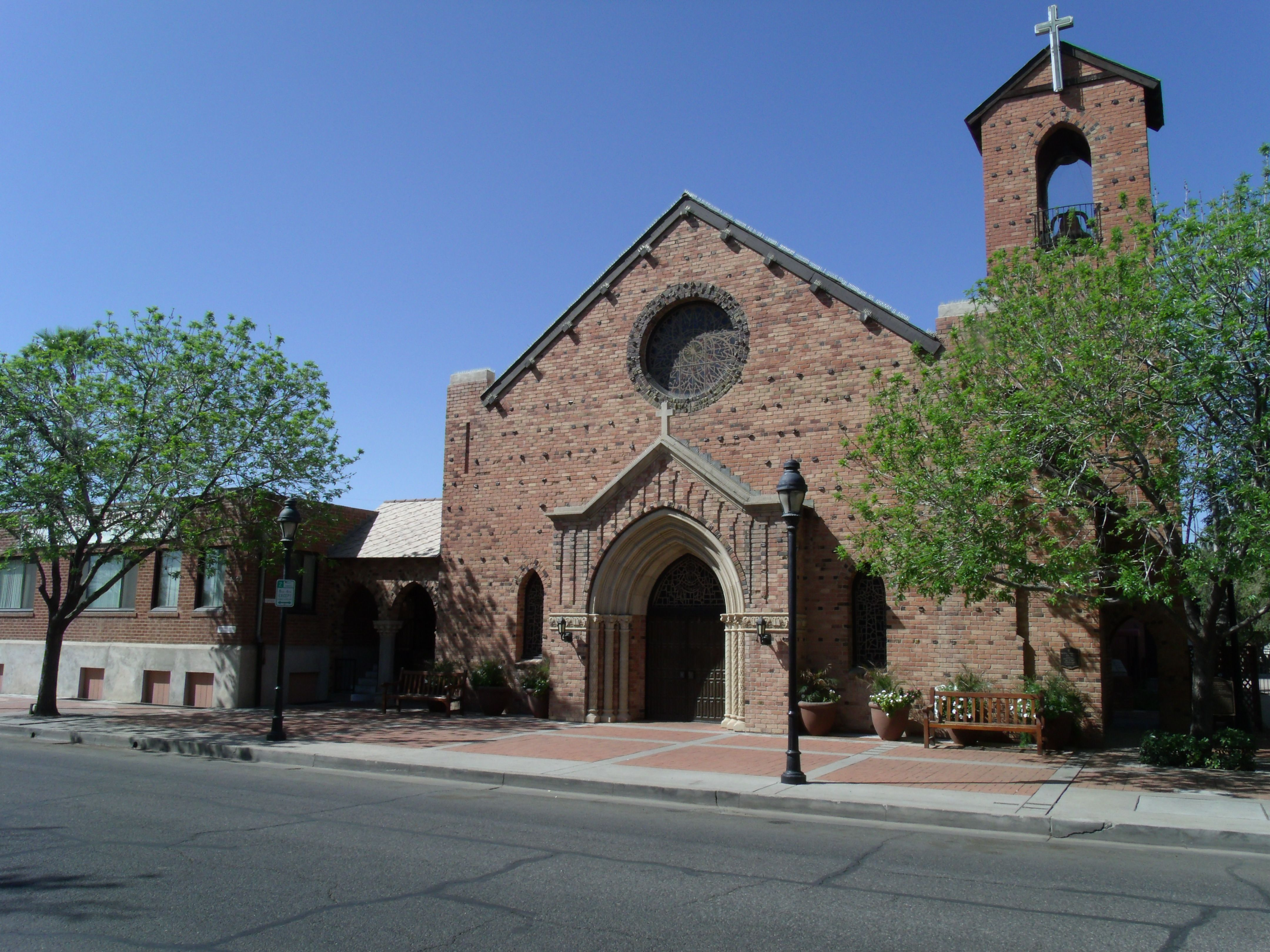
First Methodist Church, Phoenix

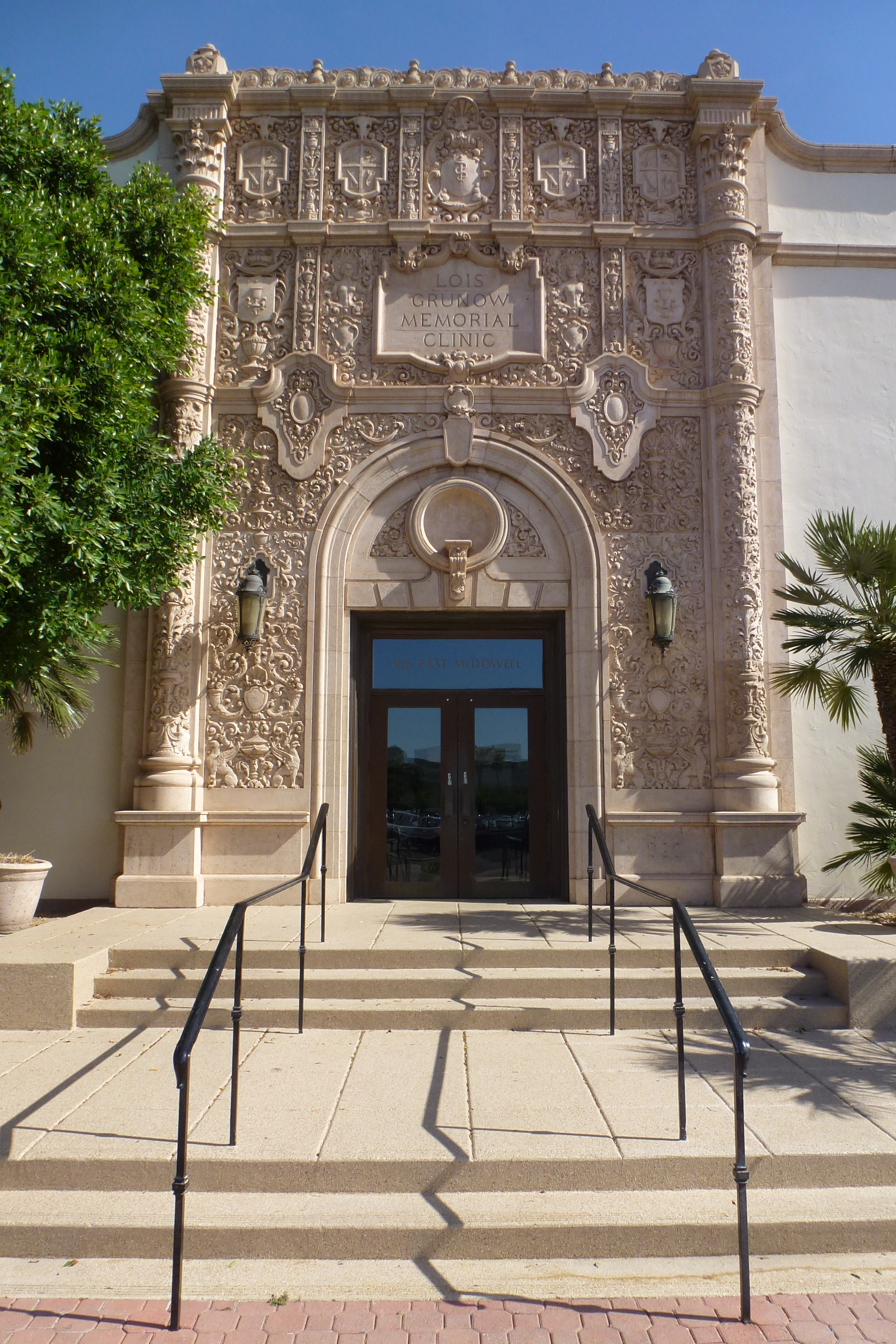
Lois Grunow Memorial Clinic

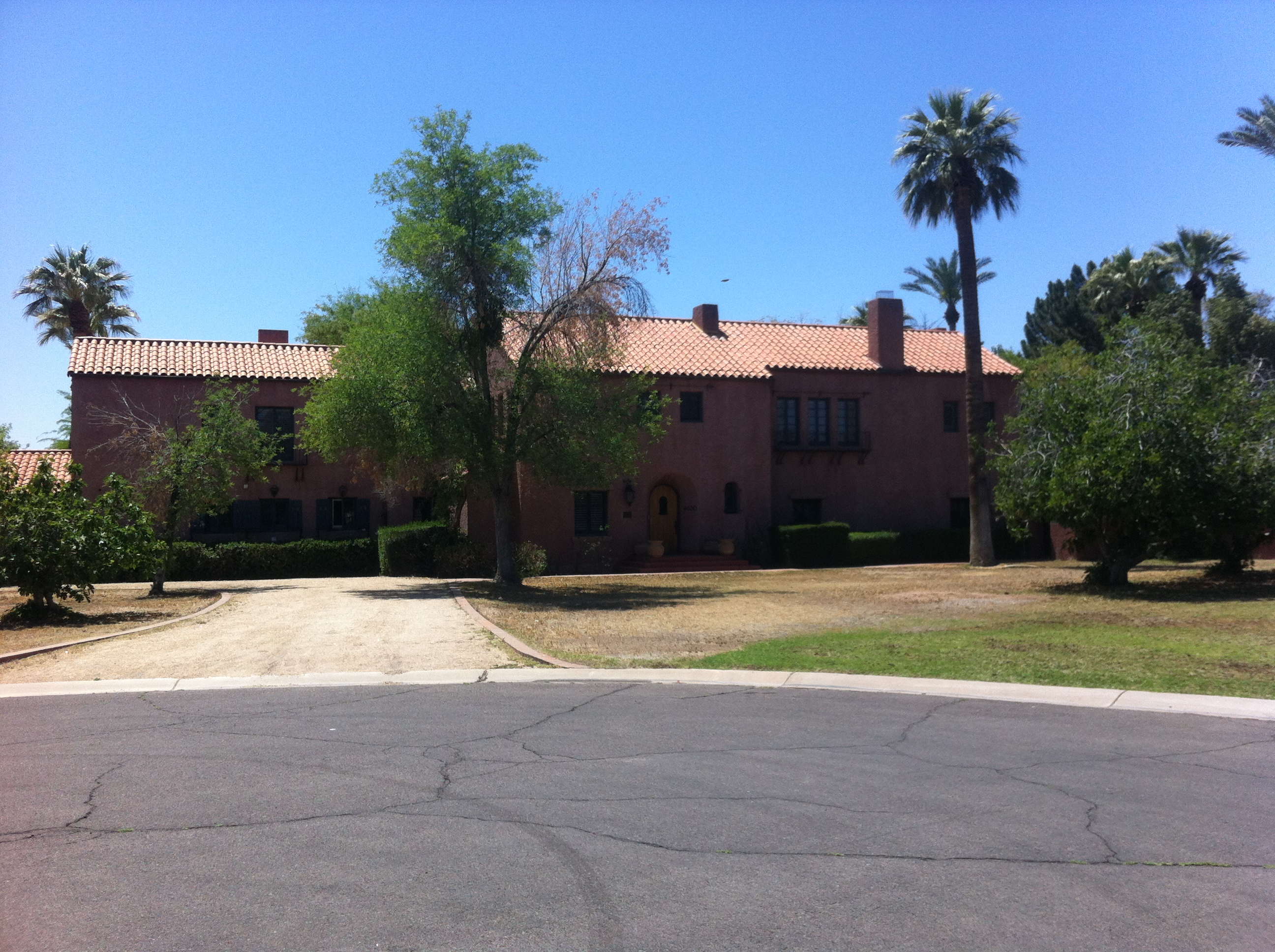
Rancho Joaquina House

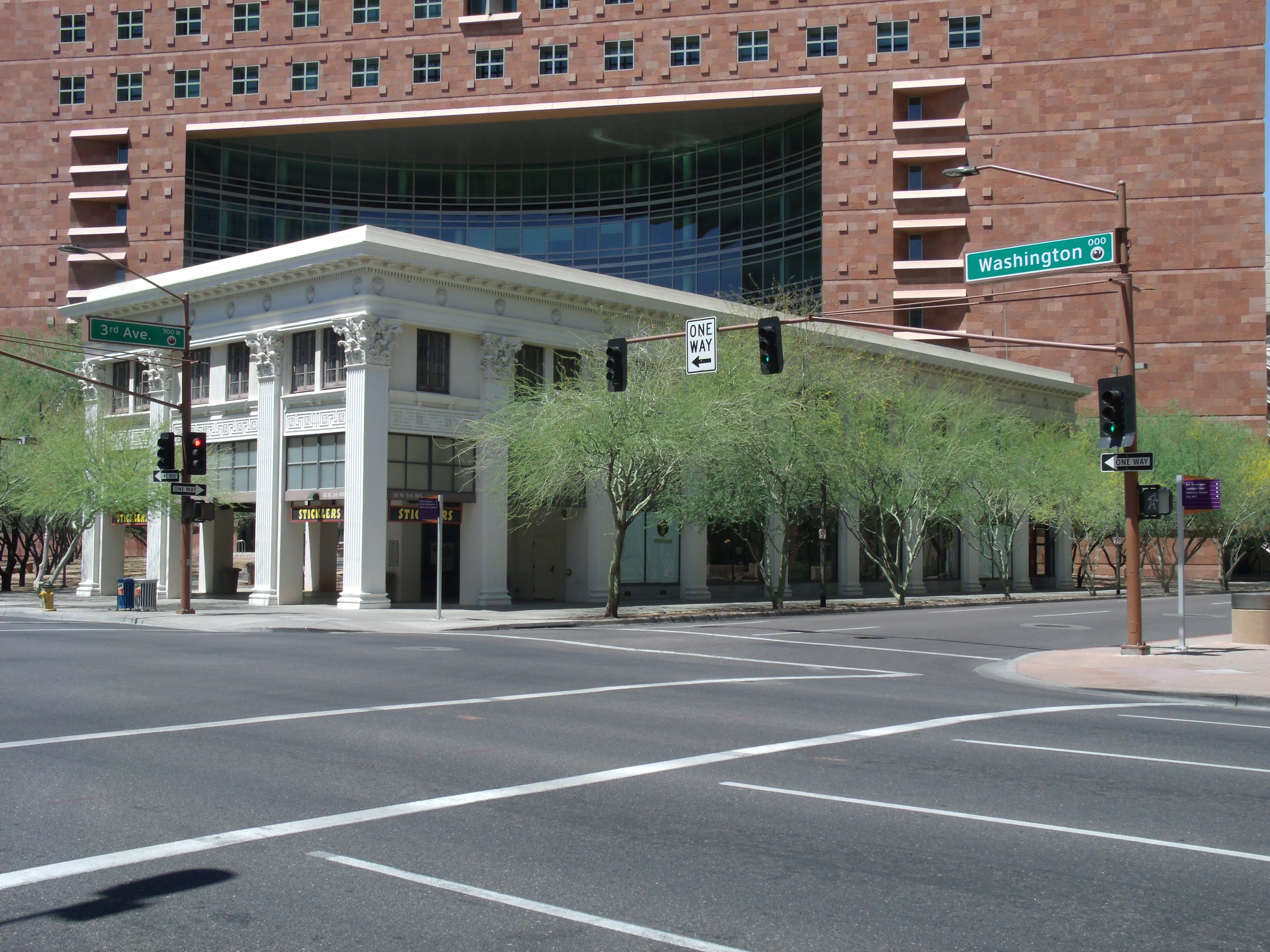
J.W. Walker Building

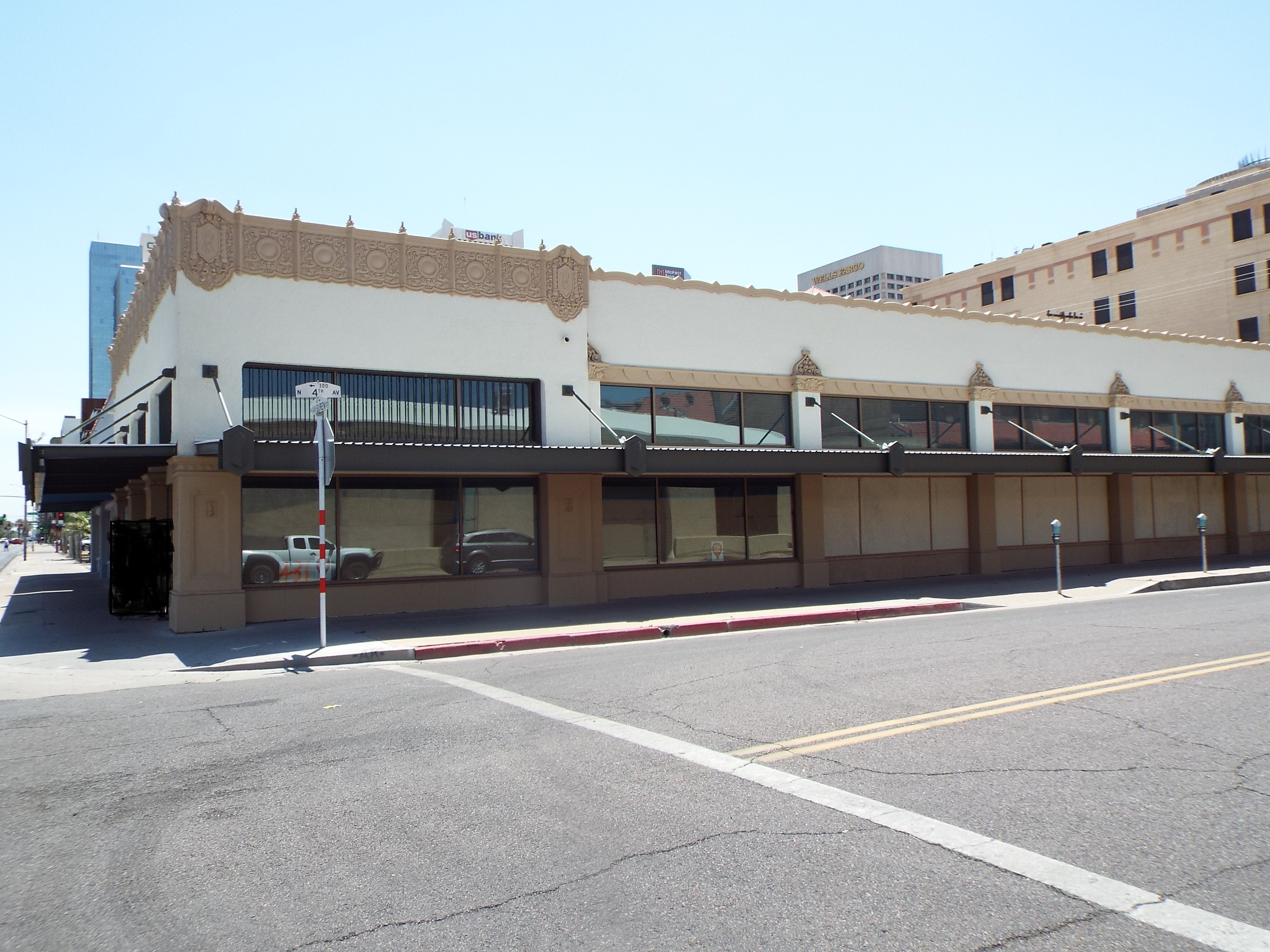
Welnick Arcade Grocery
