= Glendale Woman's Club =

- Glendale Woman's Club Clubhouse
- U.S. National Register of Historic Places
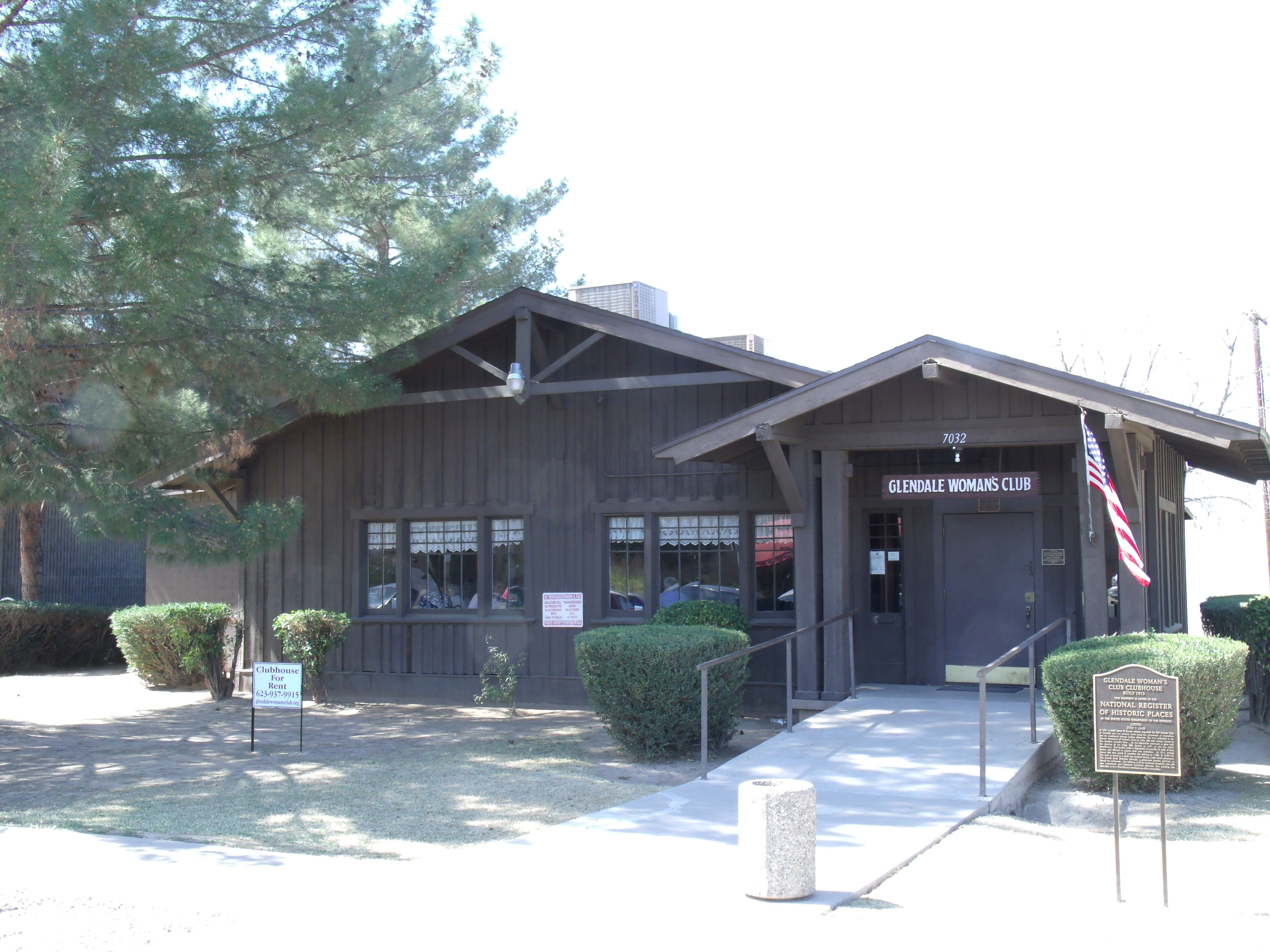

- Location within Arizona
- Location: 7032 North 56th Avenue, Glendale, Arizona
- Coordinates: 33°32′23″N 112°10′50″W
- Area: less than one acre
- Built: 1913
- Architect: Thornton Fitzhugh
- Architectural style: Bungalow/craftsman
- NRHP reference No.: 89001003
- Added to NRHP: July 27, 1989

The Glendale Woman's Club was first organized in 1901 as a “Self Culture Club”, the primary aim of the Woman’s Club was self-improvement from a literary standpoint. They raised money for the first library and city parks. In 1898 the lumber company moved to a new two-story office building; Mr. Messenger could no longer manage the library. A library association was formed (as a stock company). The women’s club bought up stock and then assigned members to vote. Mrs. May Catlin Hanson, through club member Mrs. Lafe Myers, donated a building which was placed in park to house the library until a new one could be built. Mrs. Robert Clark and Mrs. J.M. (Mary) Pearson took the lead. Mary took a class on “Library work” in Phoenix to be able to “start it out right.” (Club members managed the library until December 1922, when the City of Glendale took it over). By 1907, membership had increased to fifty members and it became impossible to continue meeting in homes, so the group began to think of acquiring its own clubhouse. On February 21, 1912, exactly 1 week after Arizona became the 48th state, the Club was recognized 501c3 non profit corporation with 85 members. The Glendale Woman's Club is a member of the General Federation of Women's Clubs.

The Glendale Woman's Clubhouse, at 7032 North 56th Avenue. in Glendale, Arizona, was built in 1913. In 1912, $5 shares of stock were sold to build one of the first Woman’s Club clubhouses in Arizona. It was listed on the National Register of Historic Places in 1989. It was designed by architect Thornton Fitzhugh. The original structure cost $2947. and was constructed with California redwood in the Craftsman style.

The clubhouse served as a Sunday meeting place for various church denominations, starting in 1914. It was used by the Red Cross during World War I for making bandages, sewing, and packing supplies.
