= Rialto station (Pacific Electric) =

Rialto
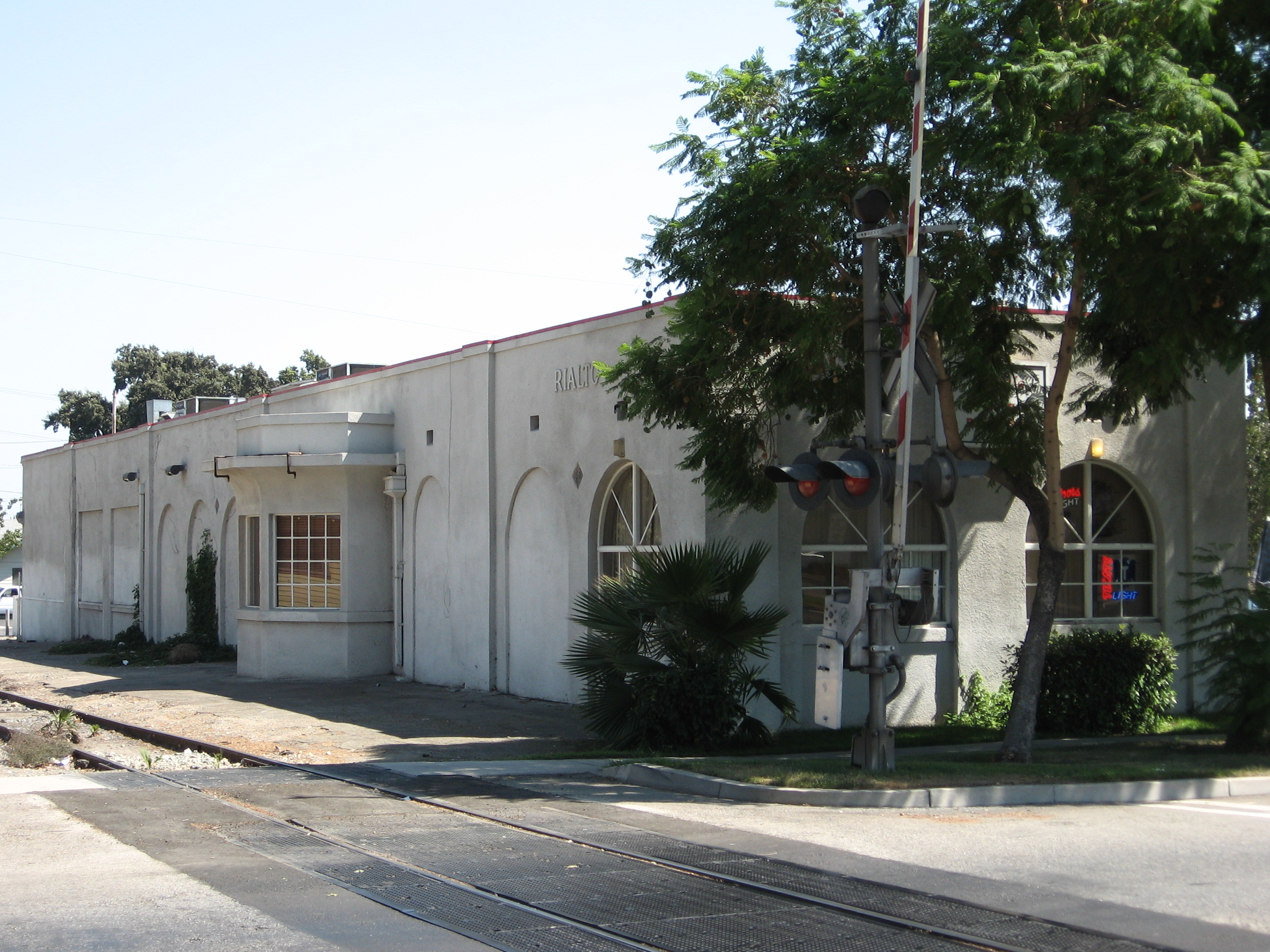
- The former Rialto Depot, seen in 2008. The former ticket booth remains, seen protruding from the building left of center frame.

General information
- Location: Riverside Avenue; Rialto, California
- Coordinates: 34.10138°N 117.37002°W

Construction
- Architect: Thornton Fitzhugh

History
- Opened: 1914
- Closed: March 28, 1947

Former services
Preceding station	Pacific Electric	Following station
Cactus Avenue toward Pacific Electric Building	Upland–San Bernardino	Acacia toward San Bernardino
Cactus Avenue toward Pacific Electric Building	Riverside–Rialto 1931–1938	Pooele toward Riverside
Terminus	Riverside–Rialto (discontinued 1940)	Pooele toward Riverside
Location

Rialto station was a Pacific Electric train station in Rialto, California. It is located on Riverside Avenue at crossing of the Union Pacific (formerly Pacific Electric and Southern Pacific) tracks. This was the point where the Riverside–Rialto Line branched south from the Upland–San Bernardino Line. The station building was designed by Thornton Fitzhugh, who also designed the railroad's main downtown terminal: the Pacific Electric Building. The concrete structure cost the railway roughly $10,000 for construction (equivalent to $318,257 in 2025 adjusted for inflation). Direct passenger service to Los Angeles ended in 1947 when the San Bernardino Line was truncated to Baldwin Park.

After freight service to the station ended, the building was sold and had been operated as a restaurant.
