= Etiwanda station =

Etiwanda
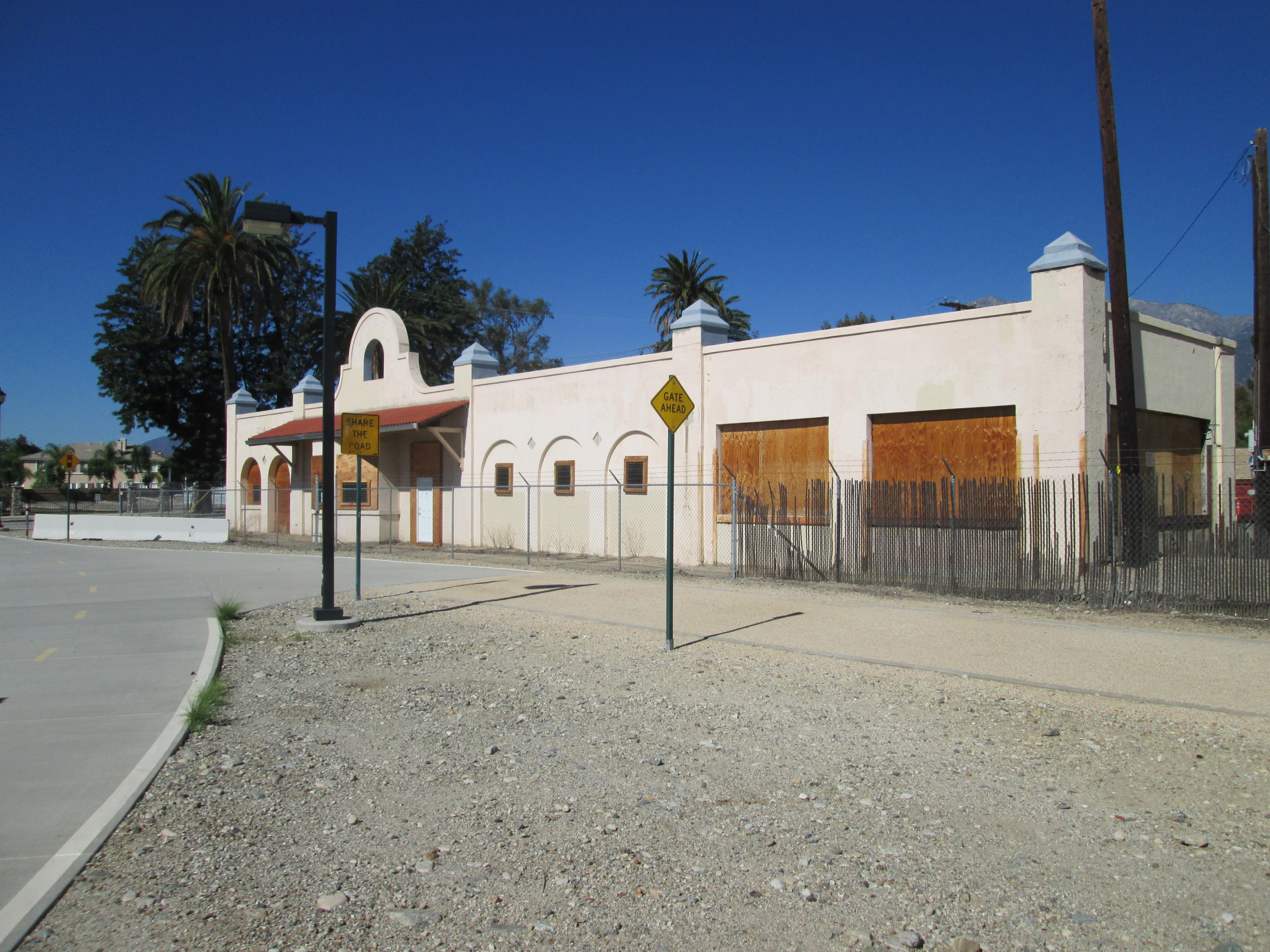
- Etiwanda Depot station building, 2015

General information
- Location: 7092 Etiwanda Avenue; Rancho Cucamonga, California
- Owner: Pacific Electric Railway
- Line: PE Upland–San Bernardino Line
- Tracks: 1

History
- Opened: January 25, 1914
- Closed: November 1, 1941 (passengers); 1960 (freight)

Former services
Preceding station	Pacific Electric	Following station
Milligan toward Pacific Electric Building	Upland–San Bernardino	Los Minos toward San Bernardino
Milligan toward Pacific Electric Building	Riverside–Rialto	Los Minos toward Riverside
- Pacific Electric Etiwanda Depot
- U.S. National Register of Historic Places
- Location within the Los Angeles metropolitan area Location within California Location within the United States
- Coordinates: 34°07′30″N 117°31′23″W
- Built: 1914
- Architect: Irving Gill
- Architectural style: Mission Revival
- NRHP reference No.: 11000119
- Added to NRHP: March 21, 2011
Location

The Etiwanda Depot is a former railway station of the Pacific Electric Railway, located in Rancho Cucamonga, California. The station was principally in service for the Upland–San Bernardino Line.

== History ==
Freight operations to Etiwanda began on December 27, 1913. The station building opened on January 25, 1914, and was constructed by the Pacific Electric. The Upland–San Bernardino Line began full operation on July 11, but cars may had run here from Pomona as early as the station's opening. Passenger service was discontinued in 1941, but the depot continued to function as a freight depot until 1960.

After being sold by the railroad, the property was used as a lumber yard until 2004. The building was added to the National Register of Historic Places on March 21, 2011.

== See also ==
- Lynwood Pacific Electric Railway Depot — another existing PE station building listed on the NRHP
- Watts Station — another existing PE station building listed on the NRHP
