= Trinity Auditorium =

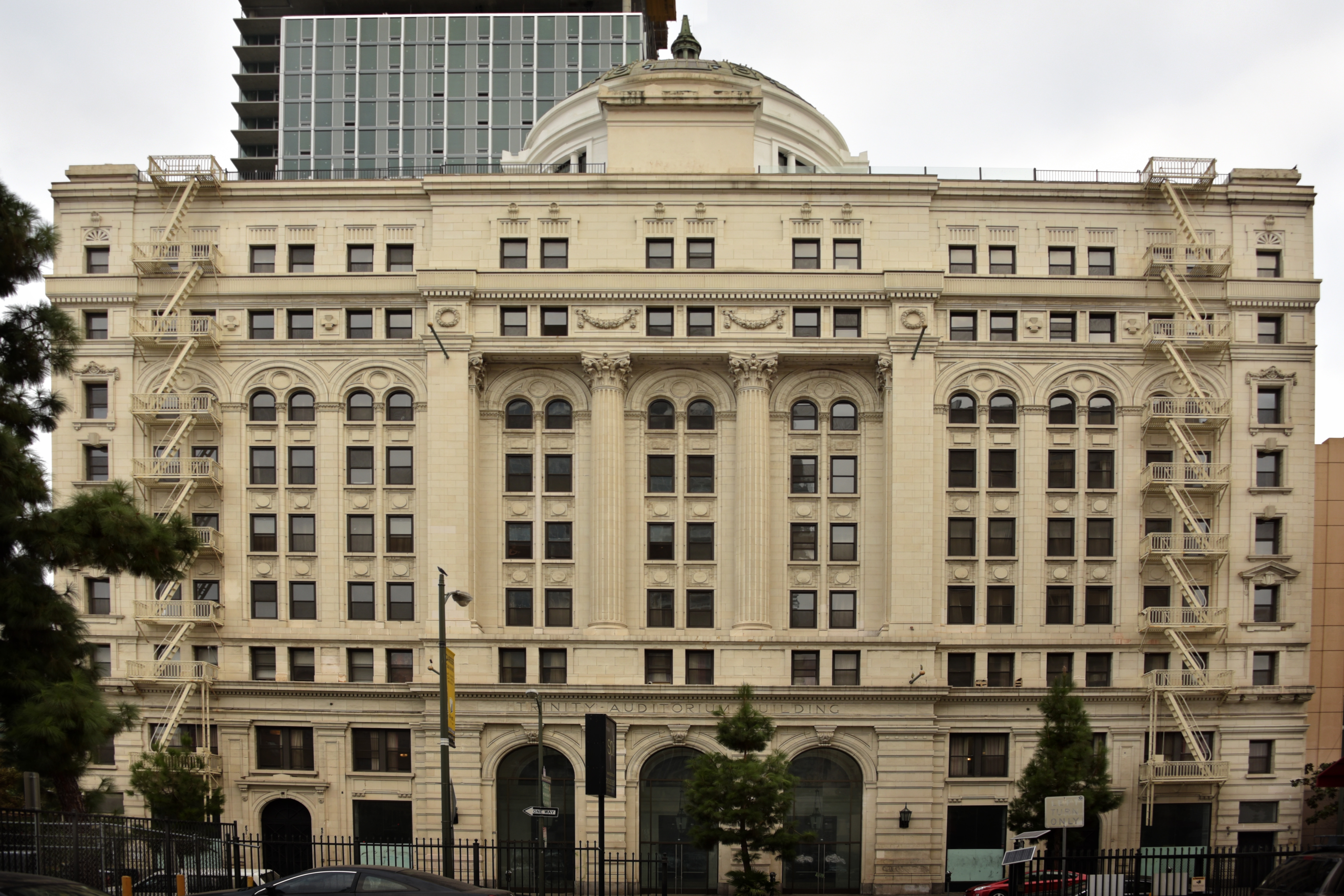
- Interactive map of the Trinity Auditorium area
- Alternative names: Embassy Hotel

General information
- Architectural style: Beaux-Arts
- Coordinates: 34.04491°N 118.25915°W
- Construction started: 1911
- Completed: 1914
- Cost: US$1 million
- Owner: Chetrit Group

Technical details
- Floor count: 9

Design and construction
- Architects: Harry C. Deckbar; Thornton Fitzhugh; Frank George Krucker

The Trinity Auditorium, later known as the Embassy Hotel and later still Trinity Hotel, is a historic building in Los Angeles, California. It was built as a plant for the Methodist Episcopal Church, South, in 1914. The Los Angeles Philharmonic debuted in this auditorium in 1919. It was used for jazz and rock concerts as well as labor union meetings from the 1920s to the 1950s. It was an annex of the University of Southern California from 1987 to 1998, when it was sold to the New York-based Chetrit Group. As of 2015, it has been vacant for more than a decade, with plans to remodel it into a new hotel.

== Location ==
The building is located on the corner of 9th Street and Grand Avenue in Downtown Los Angeles.

== History ==
The nine-storey building was constructed with steel and concrete from 1911 to 1914. It was dedicated on September 20, 1914. It cost US$1 million to build. It was designed in the Beaux-Arts architectural style by Harry C. Deckbar as the main architect, assisted by Thornton Fitzhugh and Frank George Krucker.

The building was a church planting for the Methodist Episcopal Church, South, with a large auditorium boasting the largest pipe organ in the Western United States and a men-only hotel on the six upper floors (renamed the Embassy Hotel in 1930). It also came with "a cafeteria, roof garden, library, gymnasium, smoking room, bowling alley, nursery, barber shop, hospital and 16 club rooms." The pastor was Reverend Charles Claude Selecman, who later served as the third president of Southern Methodist University in Dallas, Texas.

Beyond Methodist services, the auditorium was used to show silent films. For example, actress Norma Talmadge watched a film she starred in, The Battle Cry of Peace, in this auditorium in 1915. Meanwhile, the Los Angeles Philharmonic debuted here in 1919. From the 1920s to the 1950s, the auditorium was used as a venue for labor union meetings. Additionally, from the 1930s to the 1950s, jazz artists like Duke Ellington, Count Basie and Charlie Parker performed here. By the 1960s, the auditorium was used for rock concerts.

The building was acquired by the University of Southern California in the 1987, when it was used as a residential building and an annex. They sold it to the Chetrit Group, chaired by Joseph Chetrit, in 1998.

By 2005, the Chetrit Group decided to remodel the building as the Gansevoort West hotel scheduled for 2006. The new hotel was supposed to be an LA version of the Hotel Gansevoort in New York City. However, by 2007, the project had been cancelled. By 2012, the owners decided to turn it into another hotel called the Empire Hotel, with "183 hotel rooms, a groundfloor restaurant, an outdoor garden, a bar, and an entertainment venue." The remodel was still underway in 2014.
