= Thornton Fitzhugh =

American architect

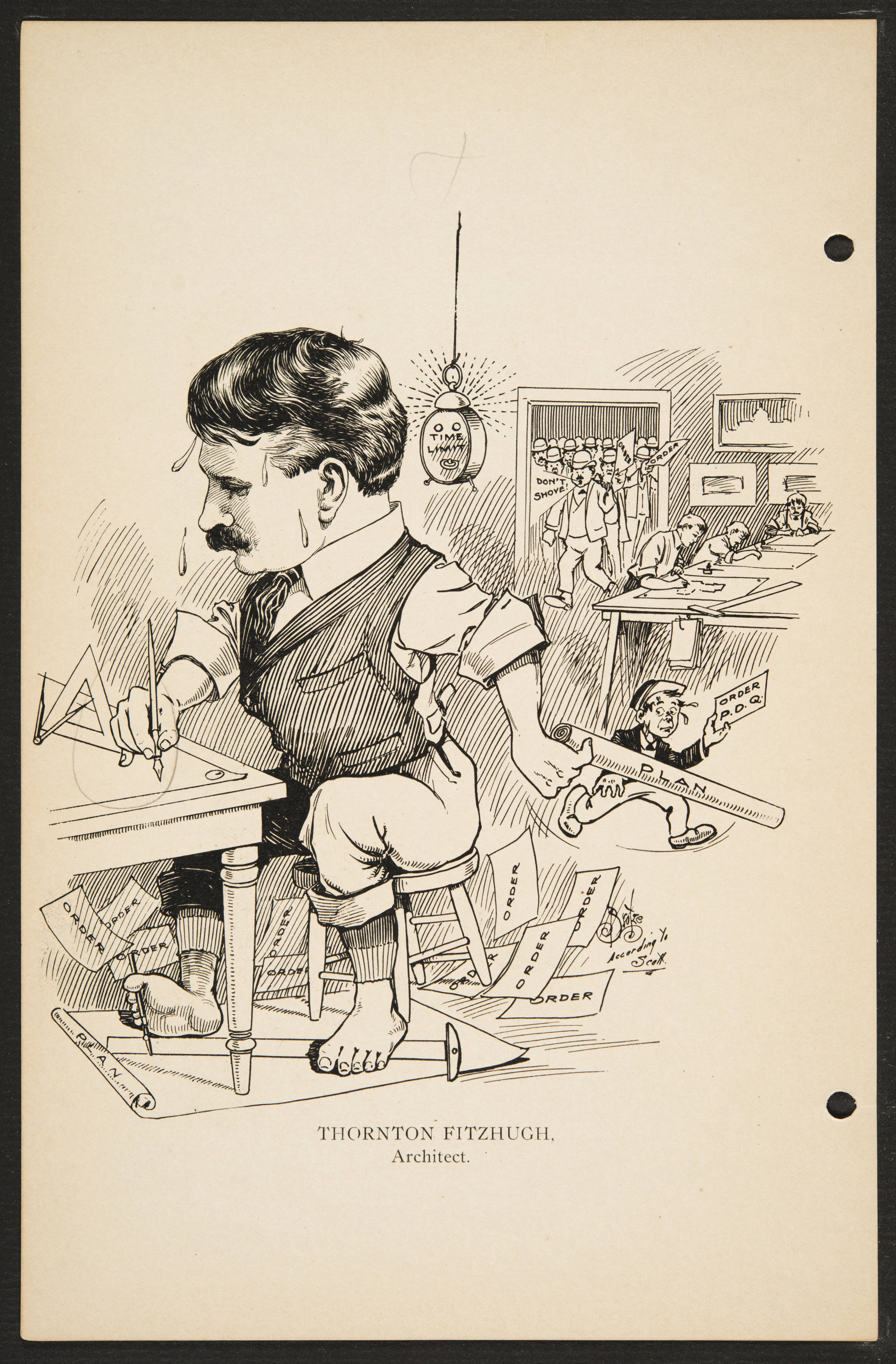
Caricature image of Thornton Fitzhugh

Thornton Fitzhugh (1864–1933) was an American architect who designed many buildings in Los Angeles, California. His most notable work is the Beaux Arts and Romanesque Pacific Electric Building.

For part of his career he was a partner at Fitzhugh, Krucker and Deckbar.

== Works ==
Fitzhugh's works include:

=== In Los Angeles ===
- Pacific Electric Building (1902–1904), NRHP-listed
- Highland Park Presbyterian Church #1 (1903)
- Homer Laughlin Building (1905 expansion) NRHP-listed
- Mayfair Apartments (1906)
- Bank of Highland Park Building (1906)
- Mrs. J.H. Newell and Miss Anna B. Clarkson House (1907)
- S.R. Jordan House (1908)
- Watkins and Belden Hotel Project (1913)
- Trinity Auditorium Building (1911–1914)

=== Elsewhere ===
- First Presbyterian Church (1904), San Luis Obispo, CA
- Glendale Woman's Club Clubhouse (1913), Glendale, AZ, NRHP-listed
- Rialto Pacific Electric Station (1914–1915), Rialto, CA
- Cooper Arms Apartments, (1923), Long Beach, CA
- G.E. Noll Building, Phoenix, AZ, NRHP-listed

== Personal life ==
Fitzhugh's brother Lee Mason Fitzhugh was also an architect.

== See also ==
- List of American architects
- List of people from Los Angeles
