= Rancho Joaquina House =

Historic house in Arizona, United States

- U.S. National Register of Historic Places
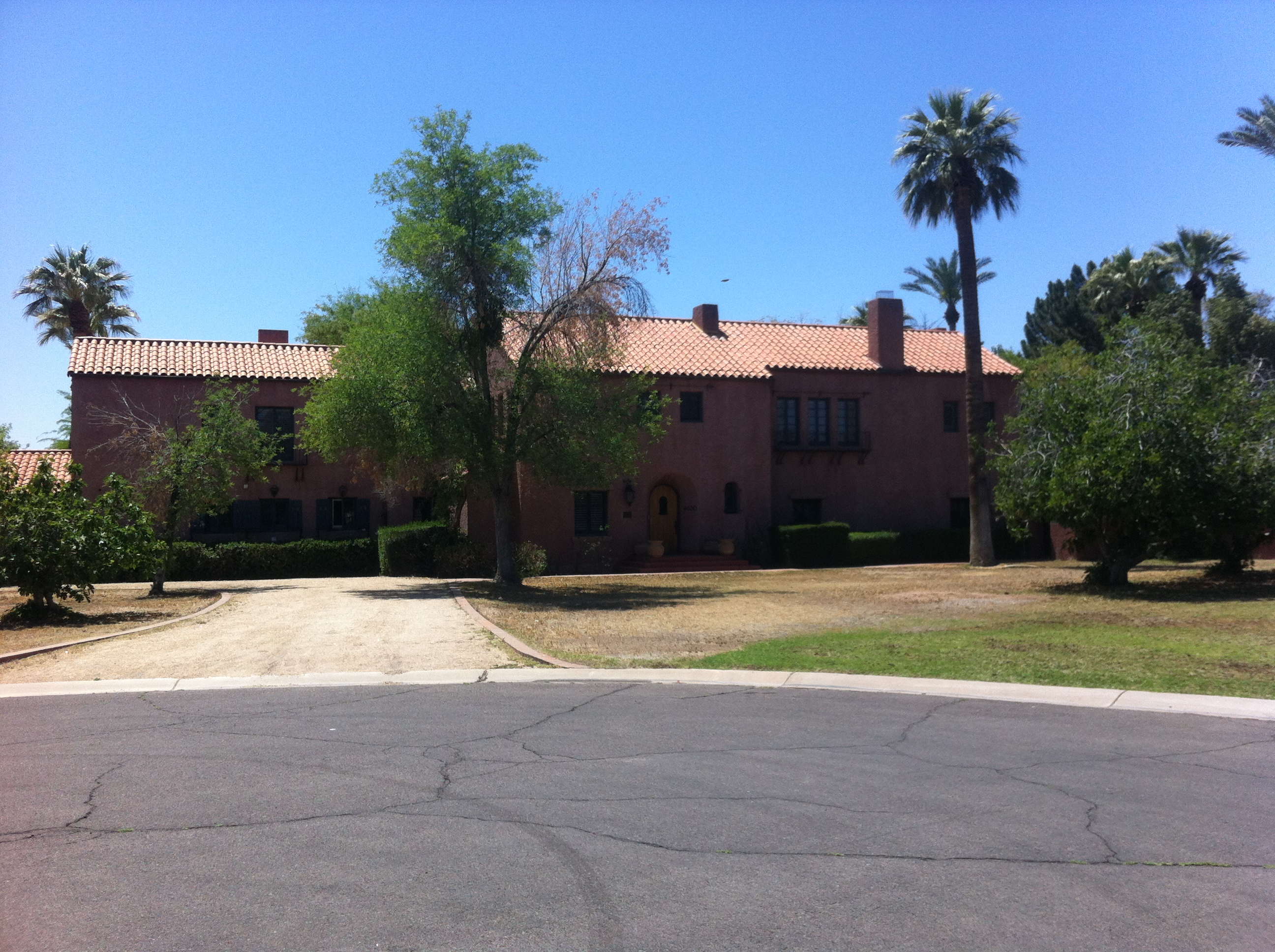
- Location: 4630 E. Cheery Lynn Rd., Phoenix, Arizona
- Coordinates: 33.485059°N 111.980861°W
- Area: 1.7 acres (0.69 ha)
- Built: 1924
- Architect: Fitzhugh & Byron; Wasielewski, E. J.
- Architectural style: Mission Revival/Spanish Revival
- NRHP reference No.: 84000786
- Added to NRHP: July 9, 1984

Rancho Joaquina House (also known as J.E. Thompson House) is a Mission Revival/Spanish Colonial Revival mansion in the Arcadia neighborhood of Phoenix. Built in 1924–1925 by the Phoenix architectural firm Fitzhugh & Byron, the mansion is known as the earliest adobe revival property in the Phoenix area. It is listed on the National Register of Historic Places and on the historic register for the City of Phoenix.

The property was built for J.E. Thompson, who was once a Republican candidate for the United States Senate from Arizona. He was also the younger brother of William Boyce Thompson. The 1950s television show 26 Men was filmed, in part, on the estate. The house was largely vacant in the 1950s and 1960s, during which time local children believed the property to be haunted.

Sometime while J.E. Thompson was residing in the house, he is known to have shot and killed a man on the property who threatened to kidnap his son if Thompson did not pay a ransom of $35,000. He later gave the money to the family after learning that the slain man's wife was ill.

In 1970, the property was renovated and became a designer show house. The estate today is surrounded by the El Coronado Estates community which was built in the late '60s and early '70s.
