= Roosevelt Community Church =

Historic church in Arizona, United States

- U.S. National Register of Historic Places
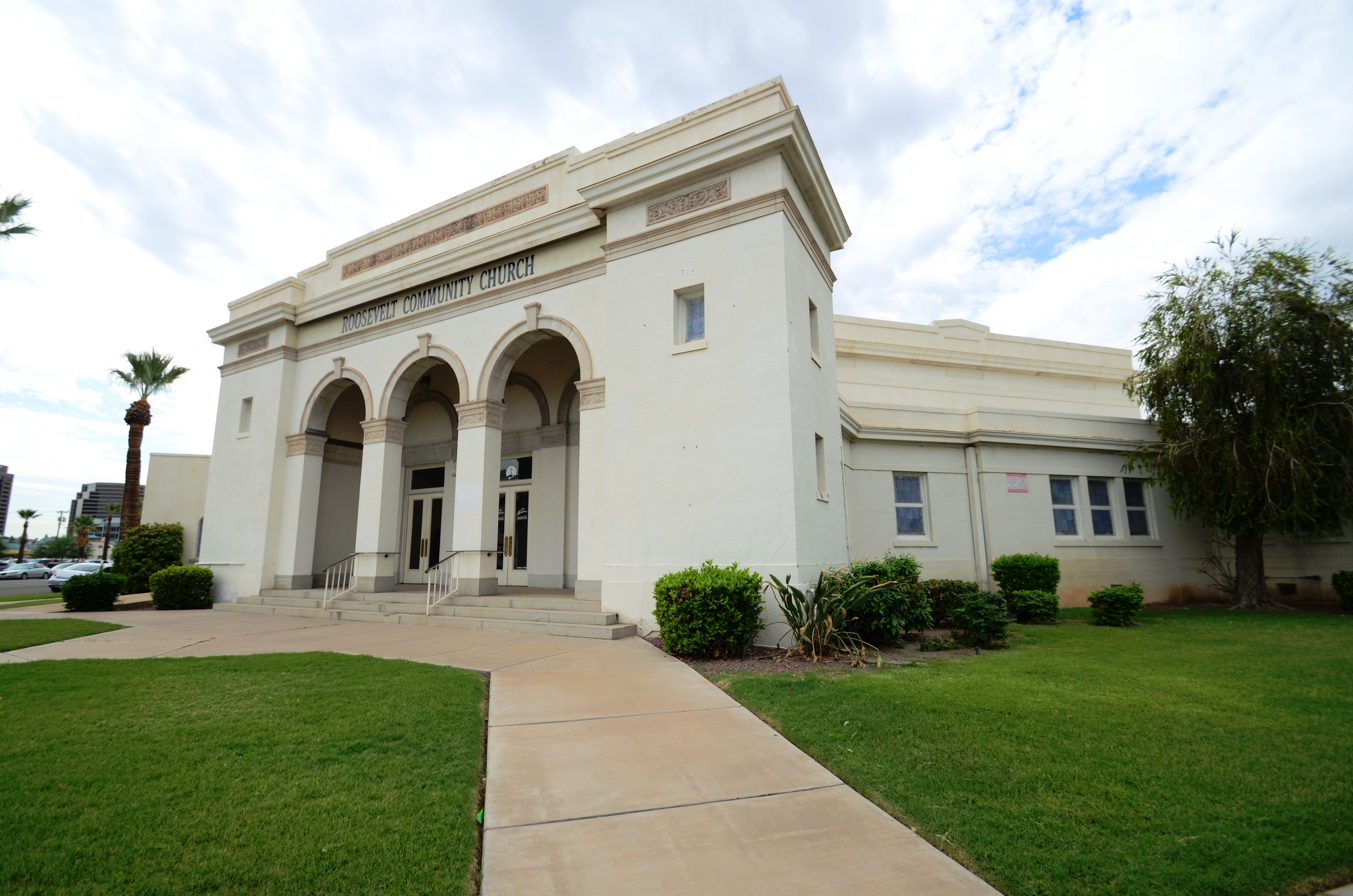

- Location within Arizona Location within the United States
- Location: Phoenix, Arizona
- Coordinates: 33°27′30″N 112°4′20″W
- Built: 1925
- Architect: Fitzhugh & Byron
- Architectural style: Classical Revival
- MPS: Religious Architecture in Phoenix MPS
- NRHP reference No.: 93000745
- Added to NRHP: August 10, 1993

Roosevelt Community Church, formerly First Church of Christ, Scientist, Phoenix, is an historic church building located at 924 North First Street, in Phoenix, Arizona. On August 10, 1993, it was added to the National Register of Historic Places. The previous First Church congregation now holds services at 830 North Central Avenue.

== See also ==
- List of Registered Historic Places in Arizona
- List of former Christian Science churches, societies and buildings
- First Church of Christ, Scientist (disambiguation)
