= Upland–San Bernardino Line =

Pacific Electric streetcar route (1914–1950)

Upland–San Bernardino
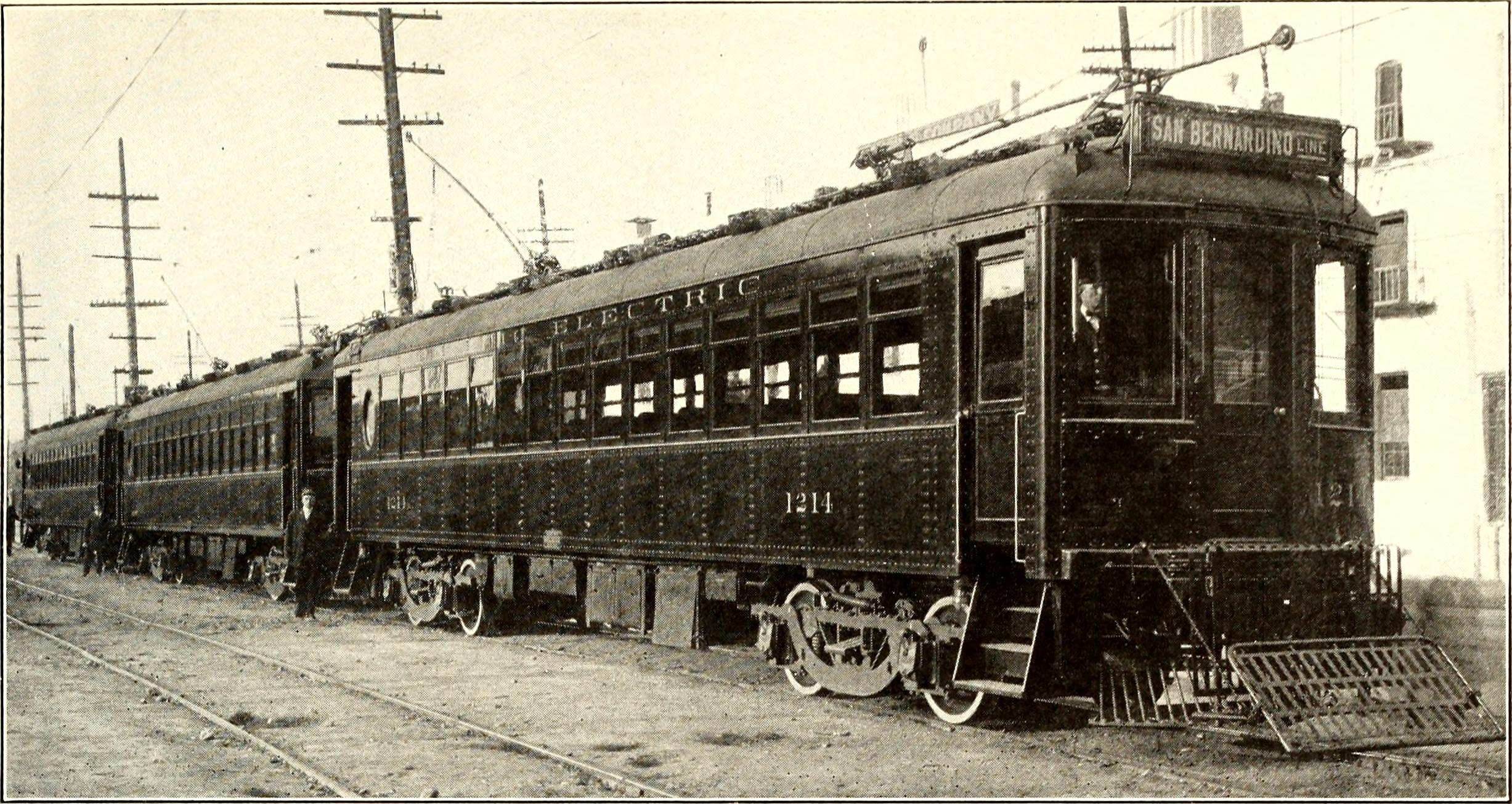
- A San Bernardino Line interurban train, 1916

Overview
- Owner: Southern Pacific Railroad
- Locale: Southern California
- Termini: Pacific Electric Building; San Bernardino, California minor terminals at Baldwin Park, Covina, and San Dimas

Service
- Type: Interurban
- System: Pacific Electric
- Operator(s): Pacific Electric

History
- Opened: 1907 (to Covina); October 26, 1910 (to San Dimas)
- Completed: July 11, 1914
- Closed: March 28, 1947 (past Baldwin Park); October 15, 1950 (final)

Technical
- Line length: 57.78 mi (92.99 km)
- Number of tracks: 1–4
- Track gauge: 1,435 mm (4 ft 8 1/2 in) standard gauge
- Electrification: Overhead line, 1,200 V DC; Overhead line, 600 V DC

The Upland–San Bernardino Line was an interurban line operated by the Pacific Electric Railway between Downtown Los Angeles and San Bernardino, California. This line also had shorter services which terminated before the end of the line at Baldwin Park, Covina, and San Dimas. Though service along this line in its entirety was discontinued in November 1941, it stands as the fourth-longest rapid transit line in American history, after the Sacramento Northern Railway's Chico and Colusa services, and the Pacific Electric's own Riverside–Rialto Line.

The right of way has been partially converted to a rail trail. Further segments of the line remain active. The western segment was rebuilt to run in the median strip of the San Bernardino Freeway with the locomotive-hauled Metrolink San Bernardino Line operating over the line since 1992. A segment near its western end around Rialto is also active.

== History ==
Pacific Electric trains reached Covina in 1907. The line was double tracked immediately following its opening, delaying implementation of the Southern Division's quadruple-track system to Watts. Tracks were extended to San Dimas on October 26, 1910 as the San Dimas Line. The route between Pomona and Upland was constructed by the Ontario and San Antonio Heights Railroad Company, which was acquired by Pacific Electric in 1912. Trains began running from the Pacific Electric Building to Pomona starting on August 31, 1912 as the Pomona Line. Finally on July 11, 1914 service to San Bernardino was commenced, providing interchanges with the San Bernardino Valley Traction Company. Pacific Electric spent $1,424,000 (Note: $45.8 million in 2025 adjusted for inflation) to bring service to San Bernardino. The Lordsburg cutoff was completed on November 1, 1914, resulting in a twenty-minute time saving between Los Angeles and San Bernardino by bypassing Pomona. A branch line to Azusa was built in 1917, though the commencement of San Bernardino trains had relegated other endpoints to secondary status along the line. The San Dimas Line was relegated almost entirely to shuttle service between Lone Hill after July 11, 1914, though some through-service to Los Angeles remained until 1916. Passenger trips to San Dimas were discontinued by July 3, 1924, though tracks were retained for farm freight.

In November 1920, two named trains were introduced on the line: the Citrus Belt Limited which traveled east in the afternoon and the Angel City Limited which made the reverse journey in the afternoon. Two more limited named trains were added in 1930: the Orange Empire Limited and Metropolitan Limited. (Pacific Electric only ran six named trains over its history, with five of them being on the San Bernardino Line.) All named trains were discontinued in 1931 along with other cuts made in response to decreased patronage due to the Great Depression.

Through service to Redlands was discontinued in 1936, while Pomona and San Bernardino trains began operating independently the following year (they had predominantly operated connected and split at Lordsburg this time). Most passenger service was truncated to Baldwin Park on November 1, 1941. Rush hour trains continued to serve Covina, and were even rerouted onto new tracks east of Baldwin Park obtained from the Southern Pacific in 1946. In 1947 all passenger trips were cut back to Baldwin Park. Unscheduled troop trains ran in World War II, though these trips were not open to civilians. On October 15, 1950, the Baldwin Park Line service was abandoned. Even after closure, the line remained popular with railfanning groups — the last passenger excursion under electric power on the line ran on August 25, 1951.

=== After passenger service ===
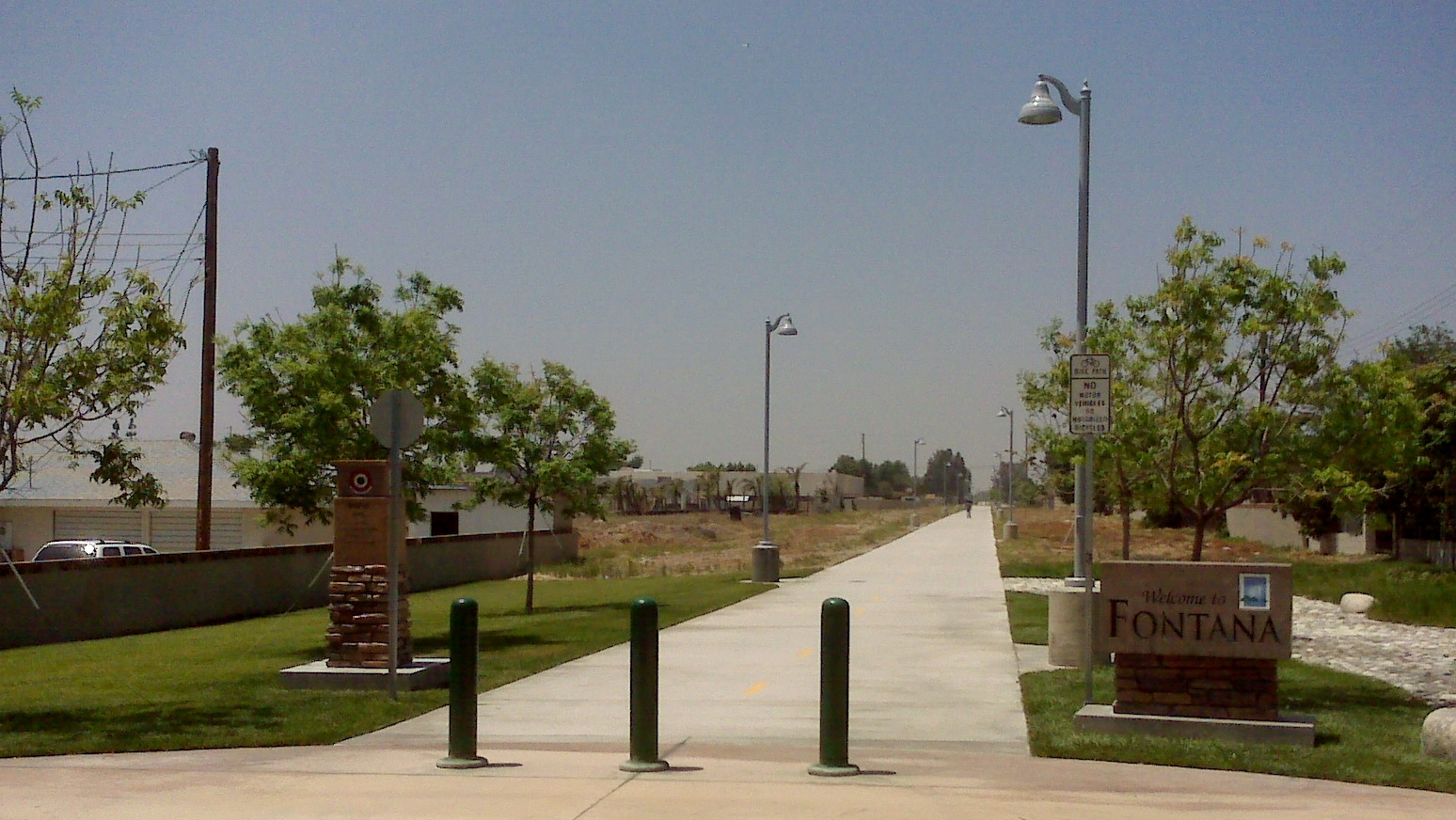
The former right of way was converted to a rail trail for part of its length.

The Huntington Drive tracks were abandoned after September 15, 1951. Freight trains were converted to diesel operations a few months later in October. It took several weeks to convert the trolley-activated DC crossing signals to low voltage track circuit operation suitable for non-electrified trains.

The western portion of the right-of-way was partially integrated into the San Bernardino Freeway. Metrolink San Bernardino Line trains utilize the same section in the freeway's median strip; this locomotive-hauled commuter rail service began in 1992. Between the cities of Claremont and Rialto, the line was converted to a rail trail: the Pacific Electric Trail. Another active segment between Rialto and the Union Pacific Mojave Subdivision is owned by Metrolink.

== Route ==
Originating from the 6th and Main Street station in Downtown Los Angeles, the San Bernardino Line exited to the east via an elevated structure over downtown streets to reach San Pedro Street at grade. The dual-tracks, running in the pavement of the city streets, proceeded north on San Pedro Street, east on Aliso Street (past its connection to Union Station) to cross the Los Angeles River and Mission Road on the Aliso Street Viaduct.

Directly east of Mission Road the tracks entered a private right of way which ran easterly and then northerly under the Brooklyn Avenue (Macy Street) Bridge. Paralleling Ramona Boulevard (since obliterated by construction of the Interstate 10 Freeway), the line continued northerly, past the Macy Carhouse, to Enchandia Junction, where the South Pasadena Line branched north. From the junction, the tracks headed easterly, still paralleling Ramona Boulevard on the right, through the State Street Yard to Valley Junction, where the Pasadena Short Line and Monrovia–Glendora Lines also branched to the north. From Valley Junction (Soto Street and Interstate 10 Freeway), the dual tracks on private way continued east along Ramona Boulevard, through City Terrace, Monterey Park, Alhambra, San Gabriel, and Rosemead to Baldwin Avenue in El Monte.

From that point, the line proceeded east on private way to cross the Rio Hondo on a single track steel girder bridge. The line then returned to dual tracks and continued east, still on private way paralleling Ramona Boulevard, crossing Valley Boulevard and Peck Road to reach the east city limits of El Monte at the San Gabriel River. Again, the line reduced to single track to cross the river on a long wood-pile bridge before returning to dual tracks on the east bank.

From the San Gabriel River, the line continued east, on private way paralleling Ramona Boulevard, to Badillo Street in Baldwin Park. Continuing, the double tracks ran along Badillo Street as far as Grand Avenue in Covina.

At Grand Avenue, the line became single track and ran on private way along the north side of Badillo Street as far as Banna Avenue in Covina. Here, the line turned in a northeasterly direction and ran on private way (intermittently paved by Ruddock Street, Badillo Street and Stratford Lane as of 1981). At Stratford Lane and Lone Hill Avenue (San Dimas Junction) the main line turned and proceeded east toward Pomona while a branch line continued on private way northeasterly into San Dimas on a single track. The main line continued on private way east from Lone Hill passing streets such as Cataract Avenue and Walnut Avenue and, turning gently southeast by Puddingstone Channel, proceeded parallel to Orange Street as far as E Street in Pomona. At E Street, a Pomona local branch line branched south and continued on private way. This diversion from the nearly continuous straight track to the east and west was the result of ranchers and farmers in Alta Vista donating right of way and funding to build the track further north.

The San Bernardino Line continued east, on single track on private way, paralleling the Santa Fe Railway north of Arrow Highway, and passing Towne Avenue and Indian Hill Boulevard in Claremont. Then turning northeasterly the line proceeded to Benson Avenue in Upland where it turned east again to run between Arrow Highway and 9th street. At 13th Avenue, a northeasterly course took the line to Alta Lorna, along private way, as far as Grande street and Archibald Avenue. Proceeding east from Alta Lorna in open country north of Base-line Road, the line passed Etiwanda Avenue and then turned southeasterly at East Etiwanda Creek into Fontana. It turned east again at Citrus Avenue in Fontana and proceeded north of Arrow Route Boulevard, paralleling it through Rialto toward San Bernardino. The line entered San Bernardino in the pavement of Rialto Avenue and proceeded east to a point between "E" and "F" Streets. Here, the San Bernardino Line turned north to follow a private way to its terminus at the joint Pacific Electric and Southern Pacific station on 3rd Street.

=== List of major stations ===
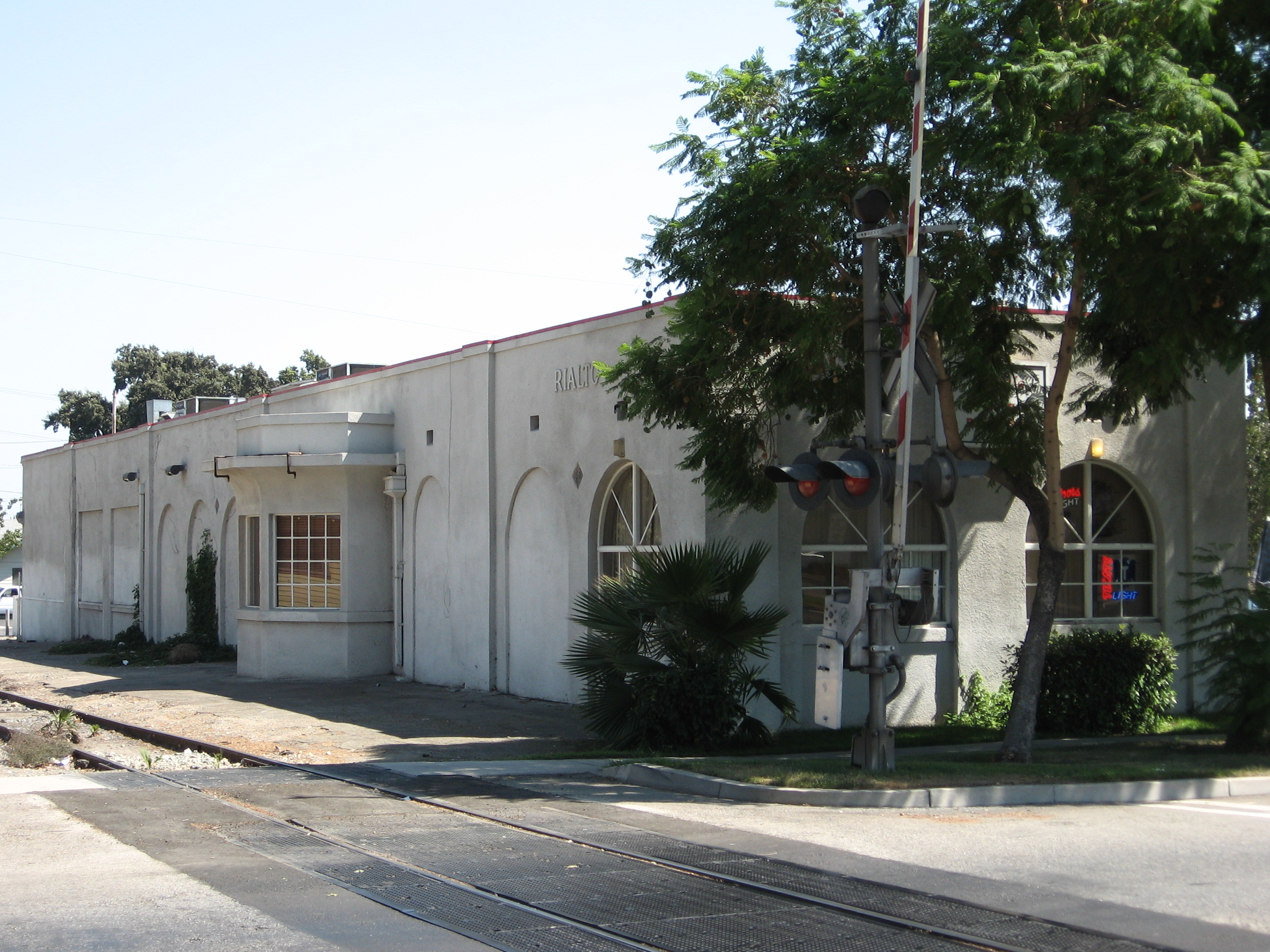
The former Rialto Depot, 2008

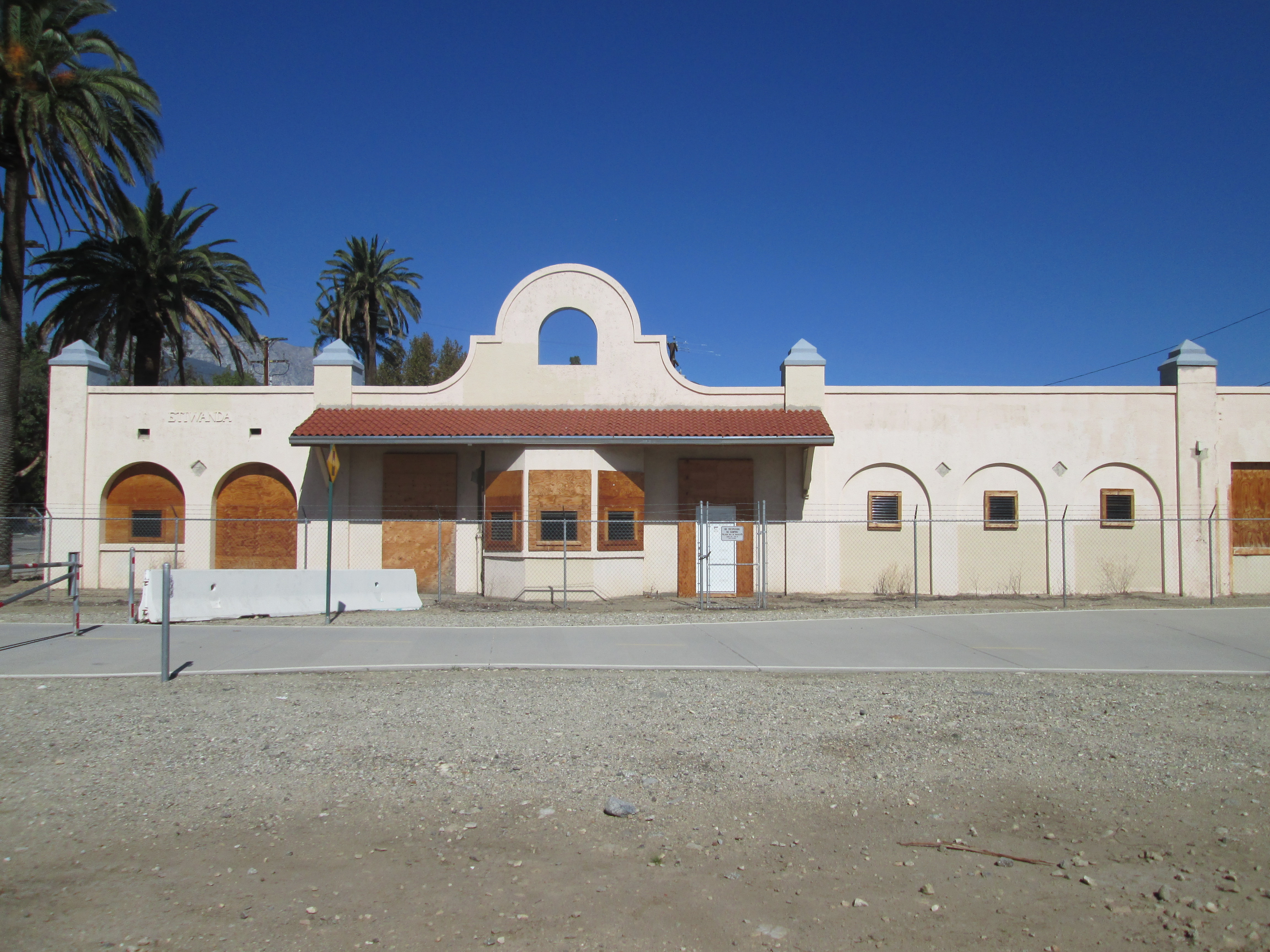
Etiwanda Depot was added to the National Register of Historic Places on March 21, 2011

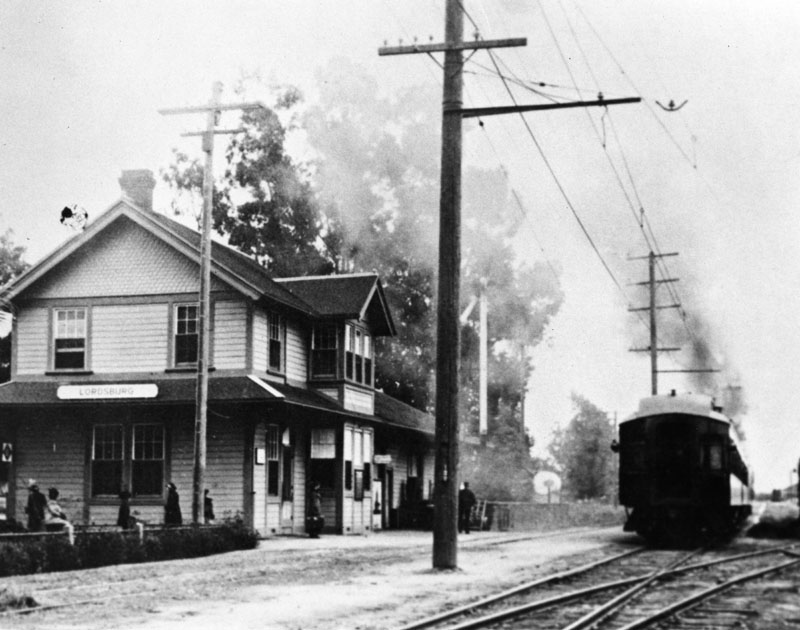
Lordsburg station (later La Verne), 1922

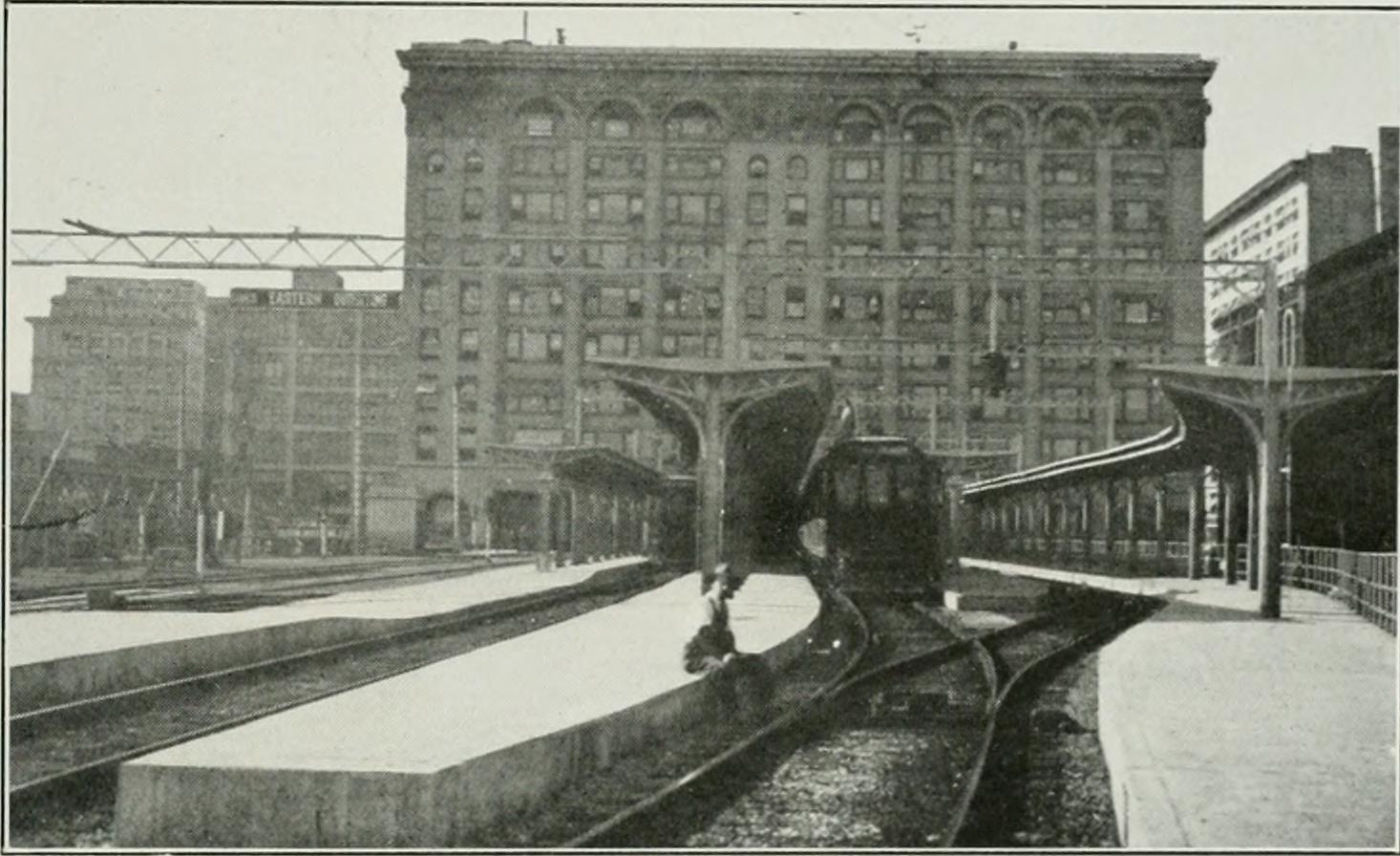
Pacific Electric Building elevated concourse

Station	Mile	Major connections	Service began	Service ended	City
San Bernardino	57.78	Arrowhead, Colton, Redlands, San Bernardino–Riverside; Southern Pacific	1914	1940	San Bernardino
Rialto	53.18	Riverside–Rialto	1914	1940	Rialto
Fontana	49.44		1914	1940	
Etiwanda	43.98	Riverside–Rialto	1914	1940	Etiwanda
Upland	35.95	Riverside–Rialto	1914	1940	Upland
Upland–Euclid Ave.		Riverside–Rialto, Upland–Ontario, Upland–San Antonio Heights	1914	1940	Upland
Claremont	32.59	Pomona–Claremont, Riverside–Rialto, Upland–Ontario; Santa Fe Railroad	1914	1940	Claremont
North Pomona	30.06		1912	1940	
La Verne	29.03		1912	1940	
San Dimas (SP)	26.58	Pomona, Riverside–Rialto; Southern Pacific	1910	1940	San Dimas
Covina	22.03	Pomona, Riverside–Rialto	1907	1947	Covina
Baldwin Park	17.84		1907		
El Monte	13.36	Pomona, Riverside–Rialto	1907	1950	El Monte
Wilmar	9.77		1907		
Garfield Avenue	8.41		1907		
Covina Junction	3.37	Alhambra–San Gabriel, Monrovia–Glendora, Mount Lowe, Pasadena Short Line, Pasadena via Oak Knoll, Pomona, Riverside–Rialto, Sierra Madre	1902	1951	Los Angeles
Echandia Junction		Alhambra–San Gabriel, Annandale, Monrovia–Glendora, Mount Lowe, Pasadena Short Line, Pasadena via Oak Knoll, Pomona, Riverside–Rialto, Sierra Madre, South Pasadena Local	1895	1951	Los Angeles
Pacific Electric Building	0.0	Alhambra–San Gabriel, Annandale, Balboa, Fullerton, Hawthorne–El Segundo, La Habra–Yorba Linda, Long Beach, Monrovia–Glendora, Mount Lowe, Pasadena Short Line, Pasadena via Oak Knoll, Pomona, Riverside–Rialto, San Pedro via Dominguez, San Pedro via Gardena, Santa Ana, Santa Monica Air Line, Sierra Madre, Soldiers' Home, South Pasadena Local, Whittier; Los Angeles Railway B, H, J, R, 7, and 8	1905	1961	Los Angeles

== Infrastructure ==
The line operated a unique railway electrification system among Pacific Electric routes: overhead line was primarily electrified with a 1,200-volt direct current system developed by General Electric. Within town and city limits, the line shared tracks with local streetcars and utilized more traditional 600 volt power. Electrical substations providing high voltage power were located at Campbell Avenue, Baldwin Park, Baldy View, Etiwanda, and San Bernardino.

== Rolling stock ==
By 1916 the line was utilizing 1200 class rolling stock, with the 25 cars constructed by the Pressed Steel Car Company. The class number referred to the high voltage at which cars could operate, though these cars also ran unmodified on the lower voltages in denser areas.
