= First Baptist Church (Phoenix, Arizona) =

Historic church in Arizona, United States

- U.S. National Register of Historic Places
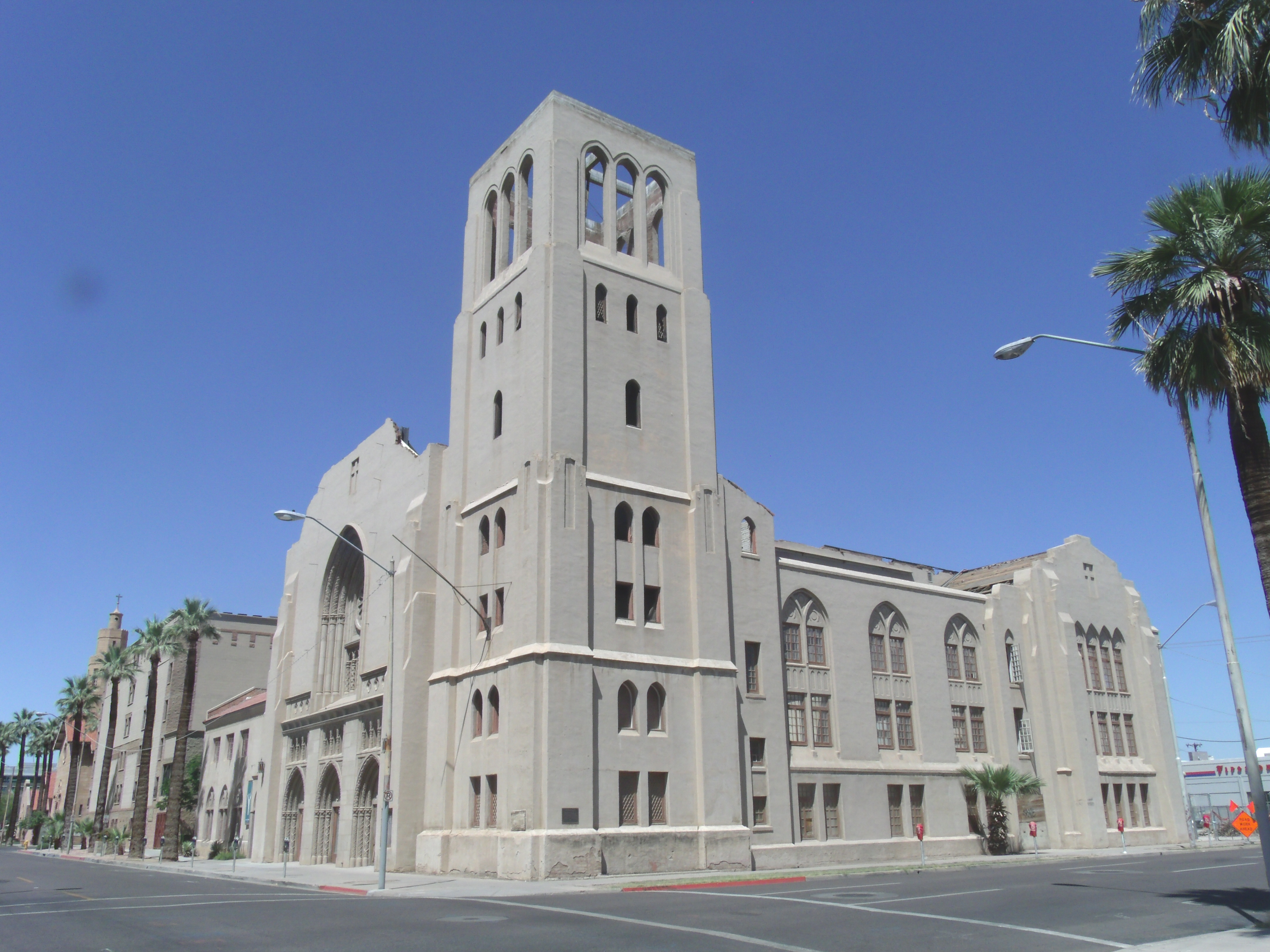

- Location within Arizona Location within the United States
- Location: 302 W. Monroe St., Phoenix, Arizona
- Coordinates: 33°27′2″N 112°4′39″W
- Area: less than one acre
- Built: 1929
- Architect: George Merrill; Fitzhugh & Byron
- Architectural style: Italian Gothic, Moderne
- NRHP reference No.: 82002081
- Added to NRHP: February 8, 1982

The First Baptist Church at in Phoenix, Arizona, was built in 1929. While local architects Fitzhugh & Byron "prepared the working drawings and supervised the building's construction," it was mainly designed by supervising architect George Merrill "of the Department of Architecture of the American Baptist Home Mission Society in New York."

It was designed in an Italian Gothic style, but includes Moderne and other architectural elements.

First Baptist Church moved to a new location in 1968.
