= First United Methodist Church of Glendale =

Historic church in Arizona, United States

- First Methodist Episcopal Church of Glendale Sanctuary
- U.S. National Register of Historic Places
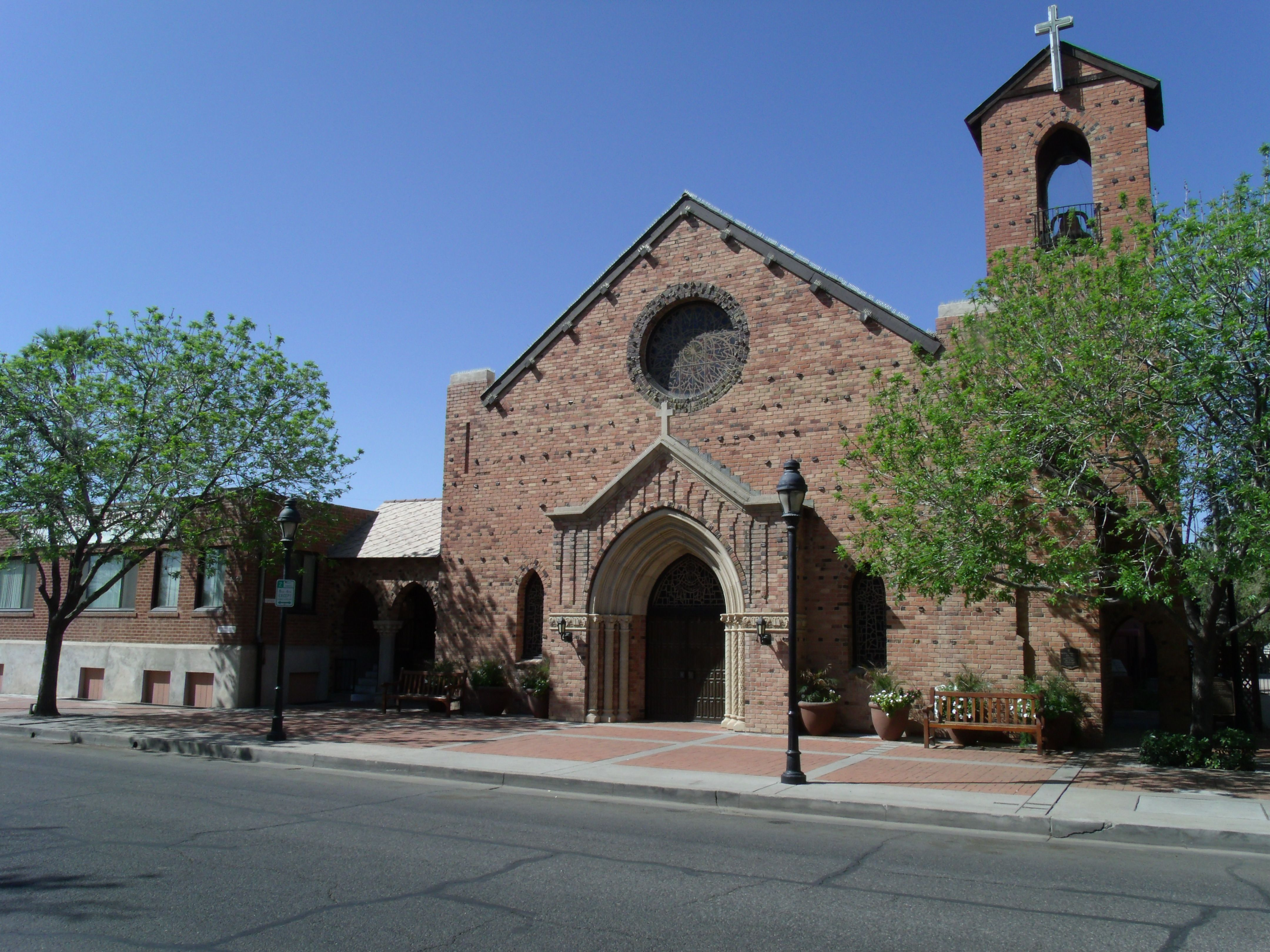
- Clinker brick accents are in loose rows above the sanctuary entrance.

- Location within Arizona Location within the United States
- Location: 7102 N. 58th Dr., Glendale, Arizona
- Coordinates: 33°32′24″N 112°11′4″W
- Area: Less than one acre
- Built: 1928-29 (sanctuary); 1923 (administrative wing)
- Built by: W.M. Mullen (sanctuary)
- Architect: G.A. Faithful and L.B. Baker (sanctuary)
- Architectural style: Late Gothic Revival
- NRHP reference No.: 05001502
- Added to NRHP: January 11, 2006

The First United Methodist Church of Glendale, formerly known as the First Methodist Episcopal Church of Glendale in historical documents, is a United Methodist church located at 7102 N. 58th Dr. in downtown Glendale, Arizona, and was built during 1928–29. Its sanctuary, with its linked administration wing, was listed on the National Register of Historic Places in 2006 for its architecture.

It is an east-facing Gothic Revival style church with a projected entryway through a Gothic arch. A castellated bell tower rises on its north side. It is connected to the south to a previously built brick administration wing (1923) by an enclosed porch and a loggia. (Note: The nomination states that the bell tower is at the northeast corner of the sanctuary, which is confirmed in photos. It states, apparently erroneously, that the bell tower is at the south end of the entryway.) Its exterior walls are brick, with occasional clinker brick accents, and it has cast stone details.

The sanctuary was designed by Los Angeles architectural firm G.A. Faithful and L.B. Baker. It was built by local contractor W.M. Mullen "with ample labor provided by church volunteers."

The church had previously begun building a different, "elaborate" Gothic Revival sanctuary, designed by local architect M.L. Fitzhugh, but this proved too expensive to complete. The effort was abandoned, and then the work was renovated to provide administrative offices, creating what is now the administration wing.

The sanctuary has a gable-end front facing east and is approximately 46 feet (14 m) by 86 feet (26 m); the bell tower at its northeast corner is about 6 feet (1.8 m) by 12 feet (3.7 m); the administration building, one story over a raised basement, is about 60 feet (18 m) by 90 feet (27 m).

The sanctuary and administration building combination was listed as First Methodist Episcopal Church of Glendale Sanctuary on the National Register. Other buildings on the property include classrooms, a Fellowship Hall, and utility buildings, none of which are included in the NRHP listing.

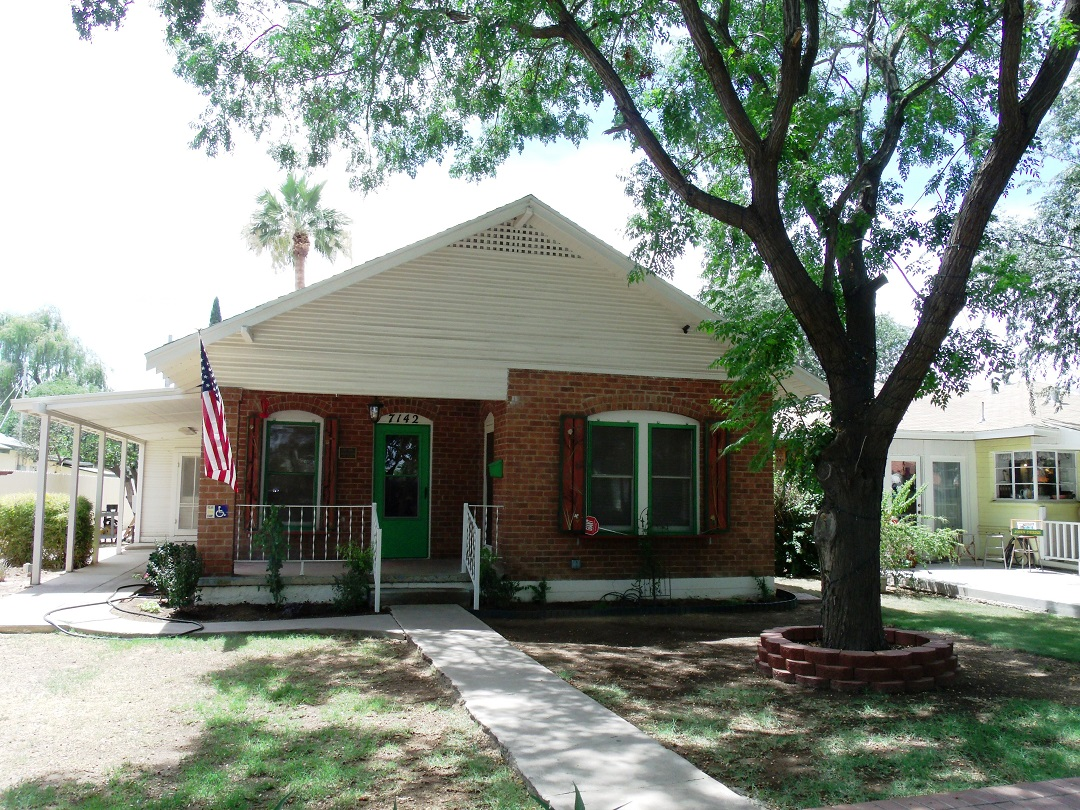
Glendale's historic Methodist Church parsonage house, built in 1898, was moved to 7142 N. 58th Avenue and is now an antique store.
