= San Fernando Line =

Part of the Pacific Electric Railway system

San Fernando
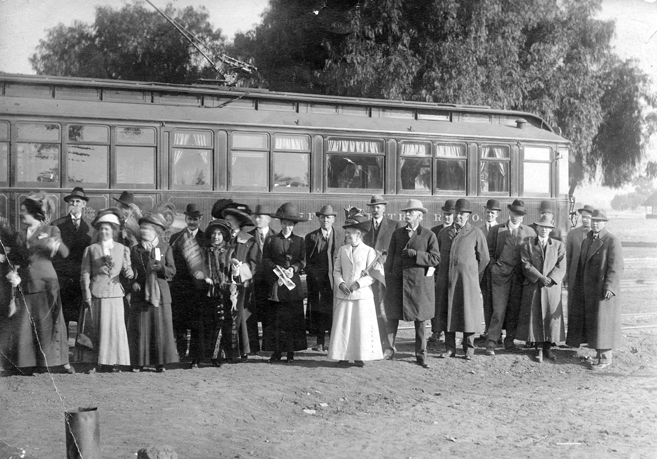
- First car over Cahuenga Pass, December 16, 1911

Overview
- Owner: Southern Pacific Railroad
- Locale: Southern California
- Termini: Downtown Los Angeles; San Fernando, California
- Stations: 36

Service
- Type: Interurban
- System: Pacific Electric
- Operator(s): Pacific Electric
- Rolling stock: PE 5050 Class Hollywood Cars (last used)

History
- Opened: March 22, 1913
- Closed: June 1, 1938 (to San Fernando); December 28, 1952 (to Van Nuys)

Technical
- Line length: 27.5 mi (44.3 km)
- Number of tracks: 1–2
- Track gauge: 1,435 mm (4 ft 8 1/2 in) standard gauge
- Electrification: Overhead line, 600 V DC

The San Fernando Line was a part of the Pacific Electric Railway system in Los Angeles County, California. It was designed to increase the reach of public transportation from the Downtown Los Angeles and Hollywood into the San Fernando Valley, to support land speculation and development expanding Los Angeles.

== History ==
=== Southern San Fernando Valley line ===
Beginning in 1911, a 20-mile (32 km) interurban electric railway was built from Lankershim (present day North Hollywood), the terminus of an existing line from over the Cahuenga Pass from Hollywood, westward through the entire southern San Fernando Valley property of the Los Angeles Suburban Homes Company syndicate, to promote and support small farm and residential property sales. The syndicate was led by Harry Chandler, with partners General Moses Sherman, Isaac Van Nuys, Hobart Johnstone Whitley, and James Boon Lankershim. The project was initiated in anticipation of the Los Angeles aqueduct opening in 1913, which would bring water for residential and irrigated agricultural development in the syndicate's San Fernando Valley holdings (and citywide). The syndicate is the Los Angeles land speculation group dramatized in the movie Chinatown.

The partner General Moses Sherman directed the Los Angeles Pacific Railroad electric railway line's construction. It ran from Lankershim to the three new towns the syndicate's partner Hobart Johnstone Whitley had planned for the valley, Van Nuys, Marion (present day Reseda), and Owensmouth (present day Canoga Park and West Hills). Tracks ran in the middle of Sherman Way, a broad, landscaped, and paved avenue to the Owensmouth terminus.

=== Northern San Fernando Valley spur ===
In addition, the San Fernando Mission Land Company of Charles Maclay and George K. Porter, which owned much of the northern San Fernando Valley (north of Roscoe Boulevard), began construction of an electric railway spur line north from Van Nuys, to connect their undeveloped land and the City of San Fernando with the Pacific Electric system. Pacific Electric would eventually take over and finish construction of this line. Service began on March 22, 1913 as a shuttle between San Fernando and Van Nuys, but through service to Los Angeles probably began by that July. From San Fernando, the southbound route followed Brand Boulevard, Sepulveda Boulevard, Parthenia Place, and then Van Nuys Boulevard from present day Panorama City to Van Nuys. Remnants of the right of way include center medians on Brand Boulevard, and roundabouts at the Parthenia Place and Sherman Circle/Van Nuys Boulevard turns.

=== Later development ===
Cars were rerouted from the surface to the Hollywood Subway beginning on February 7, 1926.

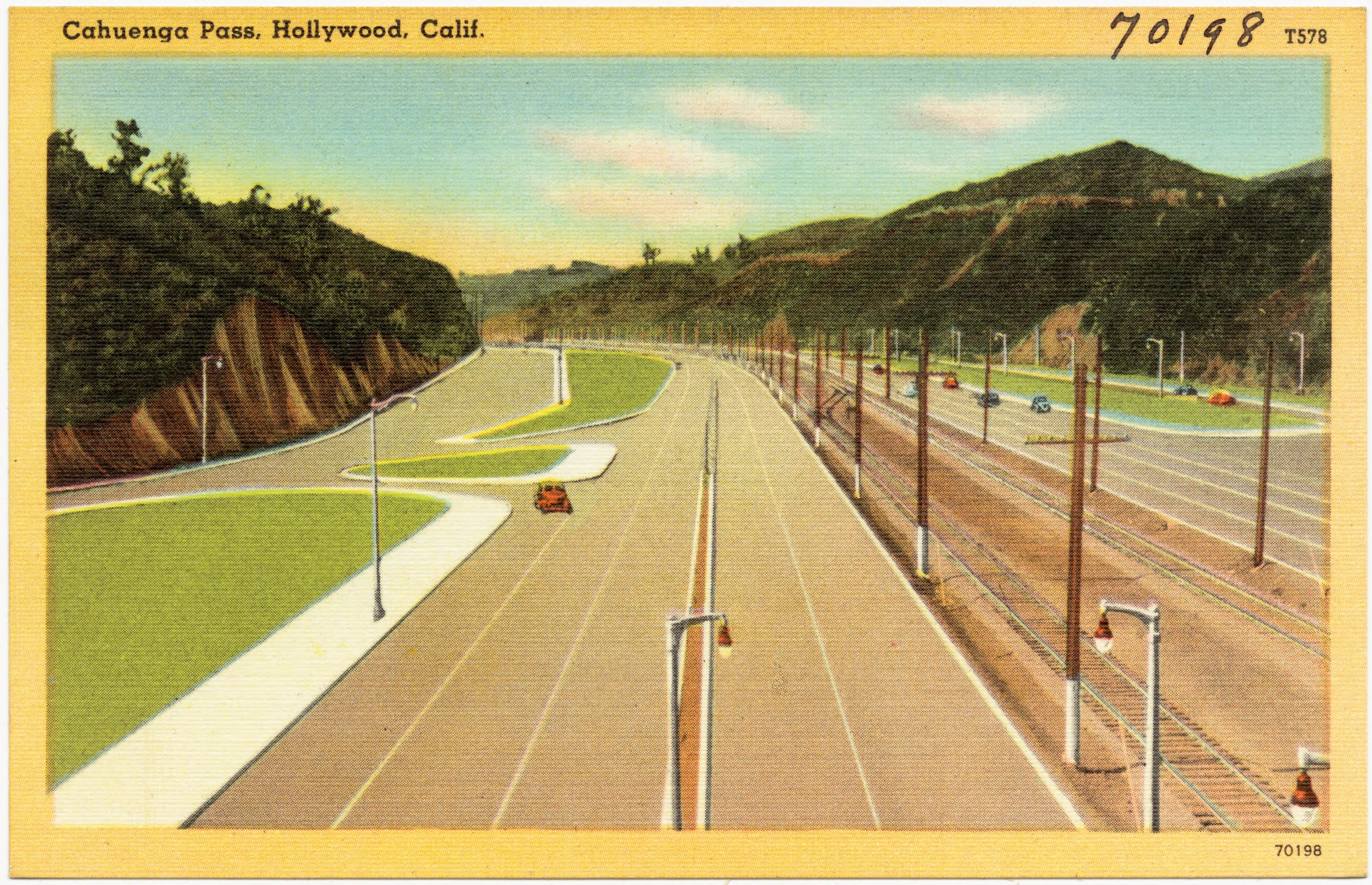
Postcard depicting the private right of way in the Hollywood Freeway median strip (right of center frame), c. 1940

The route originally navigated the Cahuenga Pass in its own right of way on the west side of the state highway. When the Hollywood Freeway was built, the line was relocated to the freeway's median strip. Services were truncated to North Sherman Way on June 1, 1938, and finally replaced by buses on December 28, 1952.

A survey conducted by Caltrans in 1981 reported that almost all of the line had either been removed or paved over for street use.

== Redevelopment ==
Part of the planned East San Fernando Valley Light Rail Transit Project is expected to reactivate much of the Van Nuys Boulevard corridor for use as a light rail line. Trains will run between the Van Nuys G Line station at the former Southern Pacific right of way and continue north on Van Nuys past the curve where the San Fernando continued operation on Parthenia Street.

== Stations ==
Station	Mile	Major connections	Date opened	Date closed	City
San Fernando	27.47		1913	1938	San Fernando
Plummer	23.81			1938	
Mission Acres	22.81			1938	
North Sherman Way	19.89	Owensmouth	1911	1952	Van Nuys
Van Nuys	19.11	Owensmouth	1911	1952	Van Nuys
Circle Drive	17.72	Owensmouth			
Kester (Ethel Avenue)	16.17	Owensmouth			
Lankershim (later North Hollywood)	14.17	Owensmouth	1902	1952	North Hollywood
Rio Vista	11.59	Owensmouth			
Universal City	11.10	Owensmouth			
Barnham Boulevard	9.99	Owensmouth			
Cahuenga Pass	8.65	Owensmouth	1902	1952	
Highland & Hollywood	7.84	Hollywood, Owensmouth, Venice via Hollywood	1902	1955	Los Angeles
Highland & Santa Monica	7.09	Owensmouth, South Hollywood–Sherman			Los Angeles
Colegrove		Owensmouth, South Hollywood–Sherman	1902	1955	Los Angeles
Virgil Avenue		Owensmouth, South Hollywood–Sherman, Western and Franklin Avenue	1902	1955	Los Angeles
Sunset Junction		Hollywood, Owensmouth, South Hollywood–Sherman, Venice via Hollywood, Western and Franklin Avenue	1902	1955	Los Angeles
Subway Terminal Building	0	Echo Park Avenue, Glendale–Burbank, Hollywood, Owensmouth, Redondo Beach via Playa del Rey, Sawtelle, South Hollywood–Sherman, Venice Short Line, Venice via Hollywood, Western and Franklin Avenue, Westgate	1925	1955	Los Angeles

== See also ==
- Owensmouth Line
- History of the San Fernando Valley to 1915
- Streetcar suburb
- Streetcars in North America
- List of California railroads
- History of rail transportation in California
