= Glendale–Burbank Line =

Pacific Electric streetcar route (1904–1955)

Glendale–Burbank

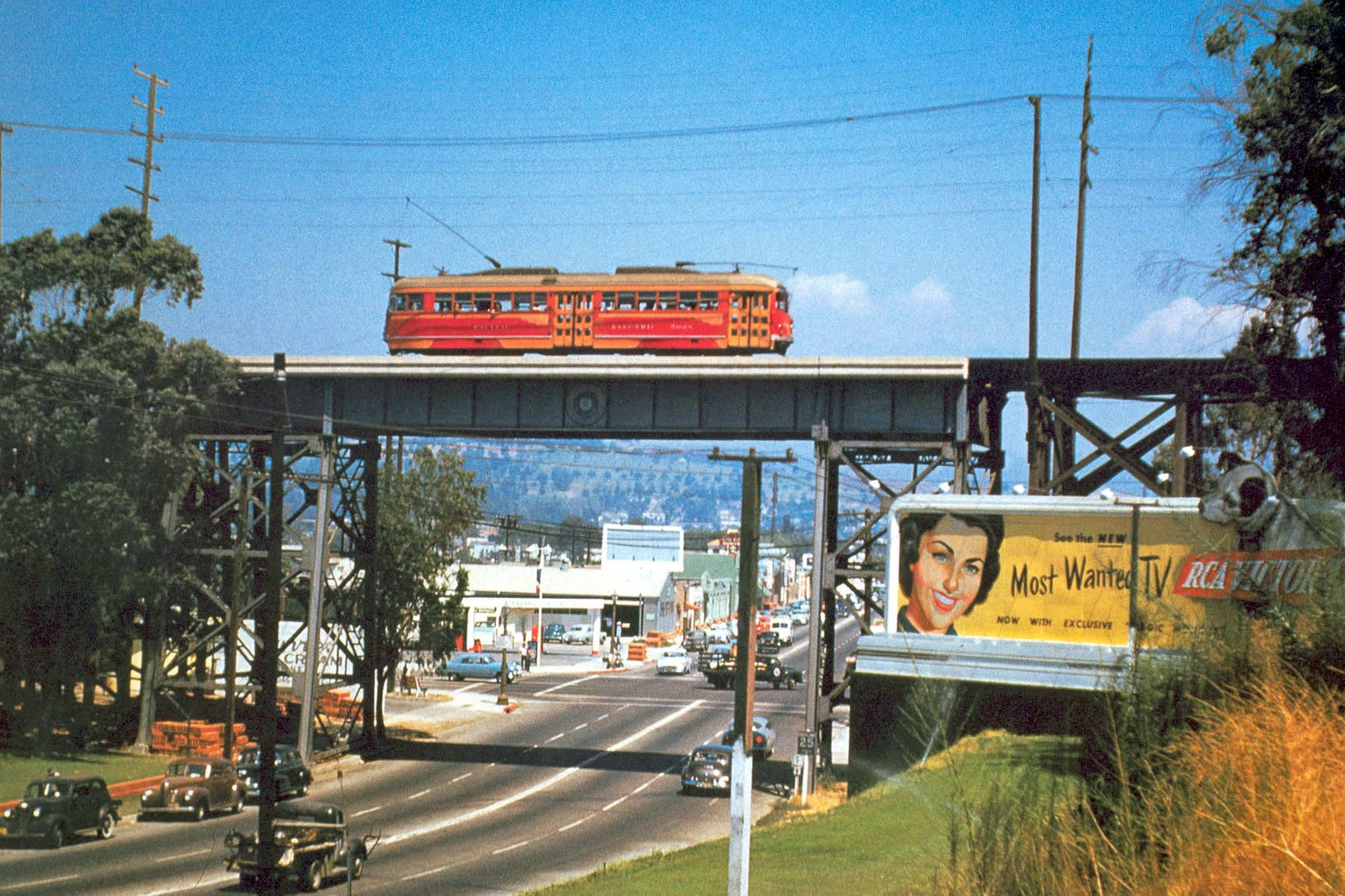
- A Downtown Los Angeles-bound Red Car near the intersection of Fletcher Drive and Riverside Drive, c. 1950s

Overview
- Locale: Southern California
- Termini: Subway Terminal; Burbank
- Stations: 21

Service
- Type: Interurban
- System: Pacific Electric
- Operators: Los Angeles Pacific Railroad (1904–1908); Pacific Electric (1908–1953); Metropolitan Coach Lines (1953–1955)
- Rolling stock: PE 5000 Class PCC cars (last used)

History
- Opened: April 10, 1904
- Closed: June 19, 1955

Technical
- Track gauge: 1,435 mm (4 ft 8 1/2 in) standard gauge
- Electrification: Overhead line, 600 V DC

Glendale–Burbank is a defunct Pacific Electric railway line that was operational from 1904 to 1955 in Southern California, running from Downtown Los Angeles to Burbank via Glendale. Short lines terminated Downtown and in North Glendale, including the popular Edendale Local.

== History ==
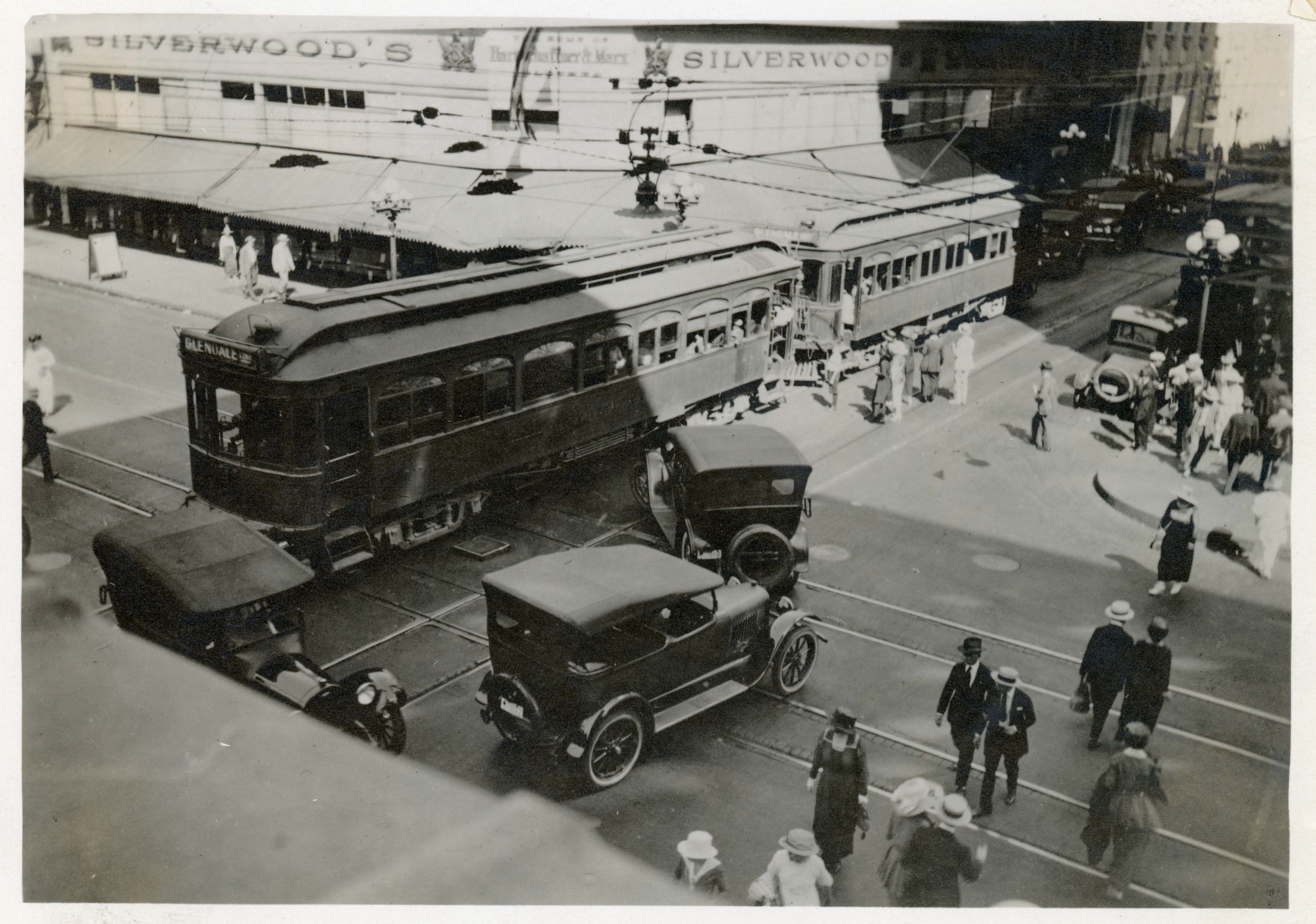
A Glendale Line train crosses Broadway on 6th Street in the 1920s. Increased congestion downtown at this time led the California Railroad Commission to force Pacific Electric to construct a subway tunnel to bypass surface streets.

Construction of the Brand Boulevard segment between Arcade Depot and Glendale was begun by the Los Angeles & Glendale Electric Railway in 1903, but the new company sold the rights to the line to the Los Angeles Inter-Urban Railway by the following year. Through service between Glendale and Downtown Los Angeles commenced on April 10, 1904. The line initially terminated at Brand and Broadway, but was quickly extended down Broadway to Glendale Avenue. LAIU acquired Casa Verdugo that year and the line was further extended up Broadway, which became the main terminal.

Los Angeles Inter-Urban went on to be leased then acquired by the Pacific Electric, with the latter assuming service in July 1908. PE suddenly tore up the tracks along Broadway one night in June 1907 and demanded a large subsidy to resume service. Eventually, the Broadway branch would be reopened under a shared trackage agreement with the Glendale and Montrose Railway, with service beginning on May 1, 1914. Service to Burbank began on September 5, 1911, initially originating at Main Street.

Pacific Electric briefly established a joint-service with the Glendale and Montrose Railway between 1916 and 1917 — cars ran from the Pacific Electric Building to Glendale Avenue on the East Glendale branch and turned north on the G&M tracks to La Crescenta. The route and partnership were discontinued in less than a year due to low ridership. The extension to Eton Drive, subsidized by local real estate developers, started carrying passengers July 20, 1925. Beginning on December 1 that same year, trains were routed through the Belmont Tunnel ("Hollywood Subway") between the Subway Terminal Building and Glendale Boulevard in Westlake. One early morning trip continued running to Sixth and Los Angeles Streets.

Many trips were replaced with buses starting in 1936, but community feedback from Burbank and Glendale was so great that the California State Railroad Commission pressured the railway to re-expand the service. A full rail schedule was restored in 1940 along with discontinuation of the Eton Drive extension.

The last car on the Broadway section ran on Christmas Eve 1946. On October 1, 1953, the route came under the purview of Metropolitan Coach Lines, who proceeded a series of service reductions. Rail service to North Glendale was discontinued on June 18, 1955, with Burbank runs also ending at the end of the service day. The route was converted to bus operation. A condition of rail abandonment was the sale of 1.8 miles (2.9 km) of the former right of way along Glendale Boulevard and Allesandro Street to the city for $1 — a property which was valued at $100,000 (Note: equivalent to $1.2 million in 2025 adjusted for inflation) at the time.

All tracks along the route had been removed by 1981. Supports for the Glendale-Hyperion Bridge over the Los Angeles River were reused for a cycling and pedestrian path in Atwater Village which opened in 2020; the Atwater Red Car Pedestrian Bridge is named in honor of the Red Cars which once used the route.

== Rolling stock ==
When PE took over service in 1908, the line was operated by 300 class cars made into trains. 800 class cars were used in 1911 until the great merger and the line was assigned 400 class cars.

To expand service after 1936, Pacific Electric purchased unique double-ended PCC streetcars to run on the line. Cars were formed into trains up to three long. These cars were retired in 1955 along with the service.

== Edendale Local ==
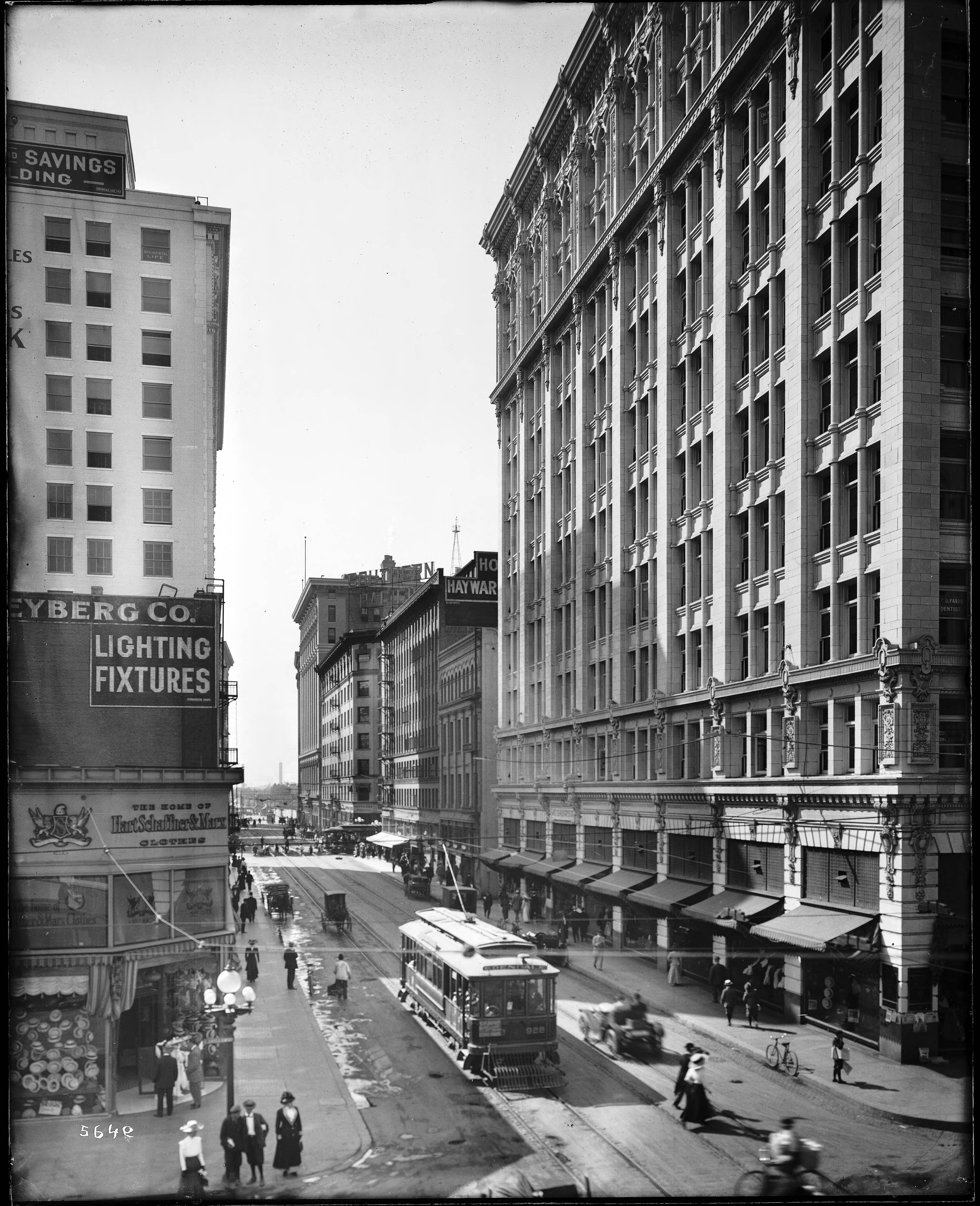
An Edendale Local on 6th Street, c. 1900–1920

Local services also operated over the line, starting at Whitmore Avenue in Edendale and running south — bypassing the Hollywood Subway on surface tracks to terminate at the Southern Pacific Railroad's Arcade Depot (later Central Station). These trips were extended north to Monte Sano in 1936. With the opening of Union Station, tracks leading to the former Southern Pacific depot were removed and Locals were rerouted into the Hollywood Subway starting in September 1940. By that November, Glendale–Burbank trains took over most local duties, with Edendale Local runs relegated to rush hours and going as far as Richardson. The Line saw a resurgence in World War II, but dedicated service was gradually withdrawn. Metropolitan Coach Lines finally dropped the last vestiges of the Edendale Local in June 1955.

== Route ==
The route started at the Subway Terminal Building. Once out of the Hollywood Subway, dual tracks traversed the Toluca yard, crossed under the Beverly Boulevard Viaduct into the center of Glendale Boulevard where they ran northerly across Temple Street, and in the 1950s under the Hollywood Freeway. Following in the pavement of Glendale Boulevard, the tracks ran directly to the west of Park Junction at intersection Park Avenue (one block south of Sunset Boulevard). There was a connection up Park Avenue to the Hollywood Line on Sunset Boulevard.

The Glendale Line crossed under the Sunset Boulevard Bridge where it entered a three-track private way which allowed passing of the Glendale and Edendale cars. The three-track private way extended north, in the center of Glendale Boulevard, past Montana Street, Alvarado Street, and Berkeley Street as far as Effie Street.

Double-track street operation was then resumed and ran to Allesandro Street. Here, the dual tracks left Glendale Boulevard to enter a private way through the Ivanhoe Hills, past Lakeview Avenue and India Street to eventually run parallel to Riverside Drive. A high wooden trestle and steel deck girder bridge carried the dual tracks over Fletcher Drive with a clearance of 40 feet (12 m). The line continued northwesterly, still along the edge of the Hills, to Monte Santo (Glendale Boulevard and Riverside Drive).

From Monte Santo, a series of three bridges carried the tracks northeasterly over Riverside Drive and Los Angeles River. The line then traversed the Atwater district in a private right of way in the center of Glendale Boulevard to the Glendale city limit where the line crossed Southern Pacific's Coast Line at-grade (where Glendale Boulevard becomes Brand Boulevard).

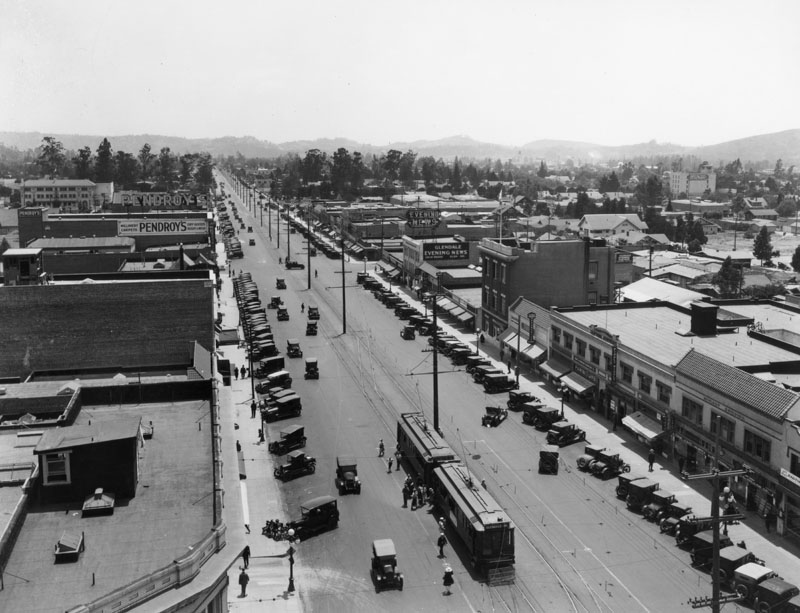
Brand Street in Glendale – a Glendale Line train stops to pick-up and drop off passengers in 1915.

The dual rails then crossed San Fernando Road where the private way ended and the line continued northerly in the pavement of Brand Boulevard, crossing Los Feliz Boulevard, Chevy Chase Boulevard, Colorado Boulevard, Broadway and Lexington Drive. The main line continued north to Verdugo Wash where the line became a single track.

At Arden Junction at Glenoaks Boulevard, the line branched. The old main line continued north in the pavement of Brand Boulevard to a terminus in North Glendale at Mountain Avenue. The Burbank Line diverged westerly as a single-track line on private way in the center of Glenoaks Boulevard, then continued westerly past Central, Pacific, Highland, western, and Alameda Avenues to a terminus in Burbank at Cypress Avenue. From 1925 to 1940 the Burbank Line continued west, following Glenoaks Boulevard, on private way to Ben Mar Hills (Eton Drive).

=== Stations ===
The following were stations or stops along the Glendale–Burbank Line:

Station / stop	Mile	Service			Major connections	Service began	Service ended	City
Station / stop	Mile	B	NG	EG	Major connections	Service began	Service ended	City
Benmar Hills	13.32	●				July 20, 1925	November 24, 1940	Burbank
Cypress Avenue		●				September 5, 1911	June 19, 1955	Burbank
Burbank	12.09	●				September 5, 1911	June 19, 1955	Burbank
Olive Avenue		●				September 5, 1911	June 19, 1955	Burbank
Tujunga Avenue		●				September 5, 1911	June 19, 1955	Burbank
Providencia Avenue		●				September 5, 1911	June 19, 1955	Burbank
Alameda Avenue		●				September 5, 1911	June 19, 1955	Burbank
Allen Avenue		●				September 5, 1911	June 19, 1955	Glendale
Western Avenue		●				September 5, 1911	June 19, 1955	Glendale
Justin Avenue		●				September 5, 1911	June 19, 1955	Glendale
Senorita–Grover		●				September 5, 1911	June 19, 1955	Glendale
Grandview Avenue		●				September 5, 1911	June 19, 1955	Glendale
Graynold Avenue		●				September 5, 1911	June 19, 1955	Glendale
Highland Avenue		●				September 5, 1911	June 19, 1955	Glendale
Concord Street		●				September 5, 1911	June 19, 1955	Glendale
Kenilworth Avenue		●				September 5, 1911	June 19, 1955	Glendale
Pacific Avenue		●				September 5, 1911	June 19, 1955	Glendale
Central Avenue		●				September 5, 1911	June 19, 1955	Glendale
North Glendale	8.92	↑	●			1904	June 19, 1955	Glendale
Stocker Street		↑	●			1904	June 19, 1955	Glendale
Dryden Street		↑	●			1904	June 19, 1955	Glendale
Burchett Street (Arden Junction)		●	●			1904	June 19, 1955	Glendale
Doran Street		●	●			1904	June 19, 1955	Glendale
Lexington Drive		●	●			1904	June 19, 1955	Glendale
California Street		●	●			1904	June 19, 1955	Glendale
Wilson Avenue		●	●			1904	June 19, 1955	Glendale
East Broadway/Chevy Chase		↑	↑	●		c. 1916 (Note: After May 1)	December 24, 1946	Glendale
Adams Street		↑	↑	●		c. 1916	December 24, 1946	Glendale
Cedar Street		↑	↑	●		c. 1916	December 24, 1946	Glendale
Glendale Avenue		↑	↑	●	Glendale and Montrose Railway	1904 (Note: No service between June 9, 1908 and May 1, 1914)	December 24, 1946	Glendale
Jackson Street		↑	↑	●		1904	December 24, 1946	Glendale
Kenwood Street		↑	↑	●		1904	December 24, 1946	Glendale
Maryland Avenue		↑	↑	●		1904	December 24, 1946	Glendale
Glendale	7.48	●	●	●		April 10, 1904	June 19, 1955	Glendale
Harvard Street		●	●	●		April 10, 1904	June 19, 1955	Glendale
Colorado Street		●	●	●		April 10, 1904	June 19, 1955	Glendale
Lomita Avenue		●	●	●		April 10, 1904	June 19, 1955	Glendale
Maple Street		●	●	●		April 10, 1904	June 19, 1955	Glendale
Garfield Avenue		●	●	●		April 10, 1904	June 19, 1955	Glendale
Chevy Chase Drive		●	●	●		April 10, 1904	June 19, 1955	Glendale
Magnolia Avenue		●	●	●		April 10, 1904	June 19, 1955	Glendale
Los Feliz Road (Tropico)		●	●	●		April 10, 1904	June 19, 1955	Glendale
San Fernando/Brand		●	●	●		April 10, 1904	June 19, 1955	Glendale
Gardena/Brand		●	●	●	Southern Pacific Railroad at Glendale station	April 10, 1904	June 19, 1955	Glendale
Richardson		●	●	●		April 10, 1904	June 19, 1955	Los Angeles
Atwater	5.46	●	●	●		April 10, 1904	June 19, 1955	Los Angeles
Glenhurst Avenue		●	●	●		April 10, 1904	June 19, 1955	Los Angeles
Monte Sano		●	●	●		April 10, 1904	June 19, 1955	Los Angeles
Fletcher Drive		●	●	●		April 10, 1904	June 19, 1955	Los Angeles
India Street		●	●	●		April 10, 1904	June 19, 1955	Los Angeles
Lakeview Avenue		●	●	●		April 10, 1904	June 19, 1955	Los Angeles
Whitmore Avenue		●	●	●		April 10, 1904	June 19, 1955	Los Angeles
Cove Avenue		●	●	●		April 10, 1904	June 19, 1955	Los Angeles
Fargo Street		●	●	●		April 10, 1904	June 19, 1955	Los Angeles
Clifford Street		●	●	●		April 10, 1904	June 19, 1955	Los Angeles
Effie Street		●	●	●		April 10, 1904	June 19, 1955	Los Angeles
Alvarado/Berkeley		●	●	●		April 10, 1904	June 19, 1955	Los Angeles
Scott Avenue		●	●	●		April 10, 1904	June 19, 1955	Los Angeles
Sunset Boulevard		●	●	●	Hollywood, Owensmouth, San Fernando, Sherman, Western and Franklin Avenue, Venice via Hollywood	April 10, 1904	June 19, 1955	Los Angeles
Park Avenue		●	●	●	Hollywood, Owensmouth, San Fernando, Sherman, Western and Franklin Avenue, Venice via Hollywood	April 10, 1904	June 19, 1955	Los Angeles
Santa Ynez Street		●	●	●	Hollywood, Owensmouth, San Fernando, Sherman, Venice via Hollywood	April 10, 1904	June 19, 1955	Los Angeles
Bellevue Avenue		●	●	●	Hollywood, Owensmouth, San Fernando, Sherman, Venice via Hollywood	April 10, 1904	June 19, 1955	Los Angeles
Temple Street		●	●	●	Hollywood, Owensmouth, San Fernando, Sherman, Venice via Hollywood, Los Angeles Railway A	April 10, 1904	June 19, 1955	Los Angeles
Court-Council-La Veta/Colton		●	●	●	Hollywood, Owensmouth, San Fernando, Sherman, Venice via Hollywood	April 10, 1904	June 19, 1955	Los Angeles
Beverly/First		●	●	●	Hollywood, Owensmouth, San Fernando, Sherman, Venice via Hollywood, Los Angeles Railway I	April 10, 1904	June 19, 1955	Los Angeles
Subway Terminal Building	0	●	●	●	Echo Park Avenue, Hollywood, Owensmouth, Redondo Beach via Playa del Rey, San Fernando, Sawtelle, Sherman, Venice Short Line, Venice via Hollywood, Western and Franklin Avenue, Westgate	December 1, 1925	June 19, 1955	Los Angeles
6th & Main Street Terminal	—	●	●	●		April 10, 1904	November 30, 1925 (Note: One franchise run continued running here after this date.)	Los Angeles

== See also ==
- Streetcar suburb
- Streetcars in North America
- List of California railroads
- History of rail transportation in California
