= Venice Boulevard Line =

Pacific Electric streetcar route (1896–1950)

Venice Boulevard

Overview
- Owner: Pacific Electric
- Locale: Los Angeles
- Termini: Hill Street Station; Vineyard

Service
- Type: Streetcar
- System: Pacific Electric
- Operator(s): Pacific Electric

History
- Opened: 1896
- Closed: December 28, 1950

Technical
- Track gauge: 4 ft 8 1/2 in (1,435 mm) standard gauge
- Old gauge: 3 ft 6 in (1,067 mm)
- Electrification: Overhead line, 600 V DC

The Venice Boulevard Line (formerly the West 16th Street Line) was a local streetcar line of the Pacific Electric. It operated between Downtown Los Angeles and Vineyard Junction, where riders could transfer to interurban cars. Nearly all Venice Short Line cars did not accept local passengers, leaving this as the primary streetcar service along its namesake boulevard.

== Route ==
From the outbound terminal at Vineyard Junction, the line ran east on Venice Boulevard (formerly known as 16th Street), turning north at Hill Street and running until the Hill Street Station. Early runs continued slightly further north to 4th Street and ending at Broadway. Later in its life, cars operated west of Vineyard as far as San Vicente and Genesee Street. Near Western Avenue, a set of sidings allowed interurban cars to bypass locals.

== History ==
Portions of the route were constructed by the Los Angeles Traction Company beginning in 1896, and it was completed between Hill Street Station and Vineyard the following year by the Pasadena and Pacific Electric Railway Company. Built to a 42-inch gauge, an additional rail was added in 1908 by Los Angeles Pacific Railroad making a dual-gauge corridor which was shared with the Los Angeles Railway. The short stub track on Fourth Street downtown was installed at this time to help turn the new standard gauge cars.

At the time of the Great Merger of 1911, local service on the line was almost entirely being operated by interurban cars. Dedicated runs began in September 1911. Running to 4th and Broadway ended in 1912 when the line was through-routed with the Echo Park Avenue Line. All interurban cars became exclusive in May 1916, thus elevating the status of the Venice Boulevard Local to be similar to the Watts Line in relation to the Southern Districts. On October 26 of the same year, the line was separated from the Echo Park Line and instead rerouted through with the Hollywood Line. Around 1932, West 16th Street was renamed to Venice Boulevard.

Additional through-routings were instated in the 1930s. Night and Sunday service was re-routed through Echo Park again in 1932. Between 1932 and 1935, rush hour cars were additionally routed to the Western and Franklin Avenue Line. Eventually in 1938, all service was rerouted to the Hollywood Line.

Starting in 1939, evening and Sunday service was being absorbed by interurban runs. With the discontinuance of the Sawtelle and Westgate Lines on July 7, 1940, the Venice Boulevard Line was extended along the old route via a private right-of-way to Genesee Street. The Venice Short Line again began doing local service starting in 1941, continuing until 1943 when it did so only during nights and Sundays.

Sunday and evening service was converted to bus operations starting September 17, 1950 — trips between Vineyard to Genesee continued to operate as a shuttle. Regular service ended two weeks later in October when the Venice Short Line franchise car to Vineyard fulfilled the obligation to operate along the route. That ended after December 28, 1950.

== See also ==
- List of California railroads
- History of rail transportation in California
