= Sawtelle Line =

Los Angeles streetcar route (1901–1940)

Sawtelle
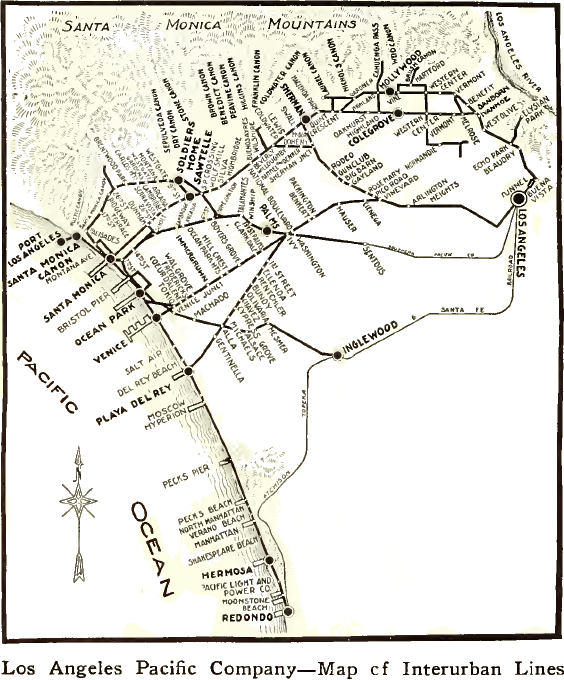

Overview
- Owner: Southern Pacific Railroad
- Locale: Los Angeles
- Termini: Pacific Electric Building; Santa Monica, California
- Stations: 17

Service
- Type: Interurban
- System: Pacific Electric
- Operator(s): Pacific Electric
- Ridership: 2,286,461 (1938)

History
- Opened: 1896
- Completed: 1901
- Closed: November 18, 1940

Technical
- Line length: 10.19 mi (16.40 km)
- Track gauge: 1,435 mm (4 ft 8 1/2 in) standard gauge
- Old gauge: narrow gauge
- Electrification: Overhead line, 600 V DC

The Sawtelle Line was an interurban railway route primarily operated by the Pacific Electric Railway that ran between Downtown Los Angeles and Santa Monica, California. The line was established by the Pasadena and Pacific Railway between 1896 and 1901, with passenger service running until 1940.

== History ==
The line was constructed in segments by the Pasadena and Pacific Railway: Beverly Hills to Santa Monica and Santa Monica to Ocean Park in 1896, 4th and Hill Streets, to Beverly Hills in 1897, and finally Ocean Park to Venice in 1901. In 1908 the entire line was converted to standard gauge, with service beginning on May 1. The line came under control of the Pacific Electric in 1911 under the terms of the Great Merger.

When Pacific Electric took over operations, the service went as far as Venice. Cars ran as far as Playa del Rey between May and August 1916. The line was briefly through routed with the Venice Short Line for three months starting in November 1926, creating a loop service. By February 1927, most trips terminated at Santa Monica, with some cars serving the Ocean Park car house. Annual ridership peaked at 2,644,512 trips in 1929.

Service was virtually discontinued after July 7, 1940, as Pacific Electric only ran a single daily car between Vineyard and Beverly Hills to maintain the franchise. Full abandonment occurred on November 18, 1940.

Rails along the line had been removed by 1981.

== Route ==
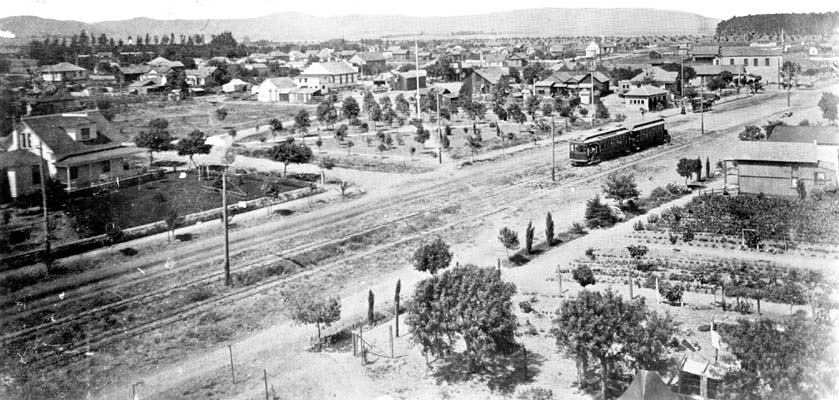
A streetcar running along Santa Monica Boulevard in Sawtelle prior to Pacific Electric taking over the line, c. 1901

The Sawtelle Line followed the Venice Short Line as far as Vineyard Junction. At Vineyard Junction, the Sawtelle Line branched northwesterly. Inside the Vineyard grounds, dual tracks ramped upon fill to join a massive grade separation structure that carried the tracks over Pico Boulevard and down on to an unimproved private way in the center of the twin roadways of San Vicente Boulevard.

Continuing northwesterly, in the center of San Vicente Boulevard the dual tracks crossed the major intersections of La Brea, Hauser, and Olympic Boulevards, Fairfax Avenue, as well as Wilshire and La Cienega Boulevards. Then they continued one block west of La Cienega to Sherman Junction (at Le Doix Road), where the Sherman cut-off branched north (in the middle of San Vicente Boulevard) to Sherman (West Hollywood). From Sherman Junction, the Sawtelle Line turned west into private way, in the center of the twin roadways of Burton Way. Running west, the dual tracks crossed Robertson Boulevard, Doheny Drive, and some of the downtown Beverly Hills Streets to reach the Beverly Hills Station (located adjacent to Santa Monica Boulevard near Beverly Drive).

At the Beverly Hills Station, the Sawtelle Line joined the Hollywood–Venice Line, and both lines were identical from that location to their common terminus at Woodward Avenue in Venice.

This line was one of four lines between Downtown and Santa Monica that did not run through Hollywood. This was the shortest route to Santa Monica.

=== List of major stops ===
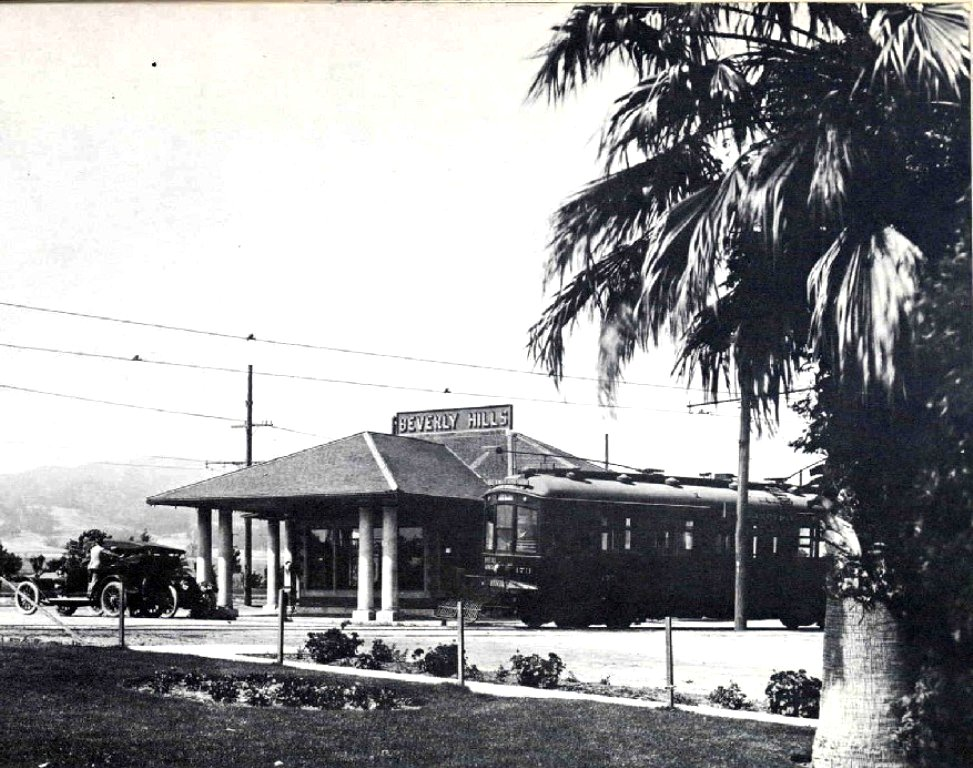
The first Beverly Hills station, c. 1915–1920

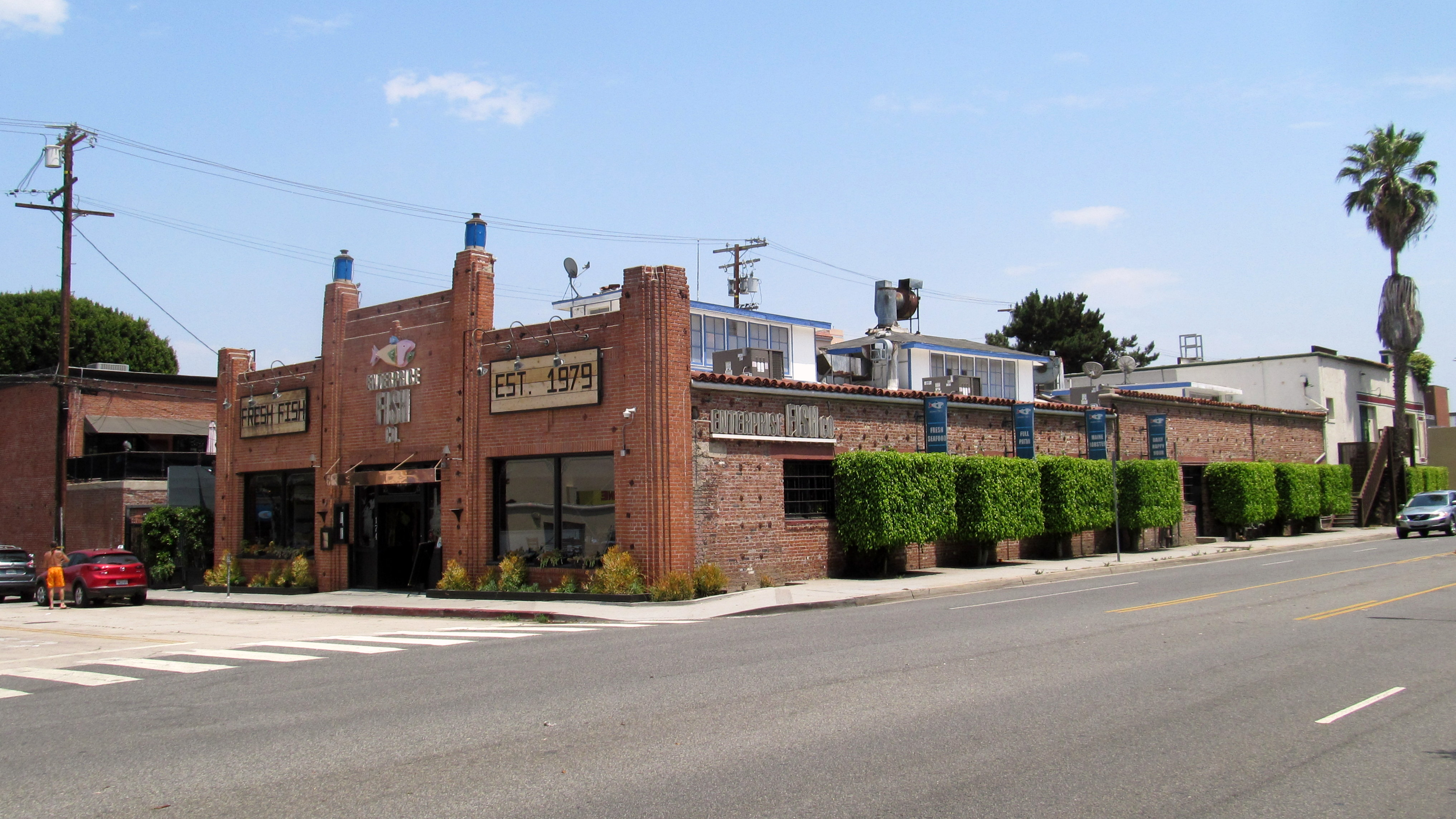
The former Ocean Park car barn

Station	Mile	Major connections	Date opened	Date closed	City
Hill Street Station	0	Echo Park Avenue, Glendale–Burbank, Hollywood, Owensmouth, Redondo Beach via Playa del Rey, San Fernando, Sherman, Venice Short Line, Venice via Hollywood, Western and Franklin Avenue, Westgate	1905	1955	Los Angeles
Vermont Avenue	2.99	Venice Short Line, Westgate; Los Angeles Railway V			Los Angeles
Western Avenue	3.99				Los Angeles
Vineyard Junction	5.56	Venice Short Line, Westgate; Los Angeles Railway P		1950	
Carthay Center	7.73				
Beverly Hills	10.18	Coldwater Canyon, Hollywood, Venice via Hollywood, Westgate	1896	1954	Beverly Hills
Sawtelle	13.36	Venice via Hollywood, Westgate			
West Los Angeles (Purdue Avenue)	13.45	Westgate			
Brentwood Country Club	15.68				
Santa Monica	17.12	Venice via Hollywood, Westgate	1896		Santa Monica
Ocean Park (Pier Avenue)	18.49	Venice via Hollywood, Westgate	1896		
Venice (Windward Avenue)	19.33	Venice via Hollywood, Venice Short Line, Westgate	1901	1927	
Playa Del Rey	21.91		1916	1916	
