= Hollywood Line =

Pacific Electric streetcar line (1909–1953)

Hollywood
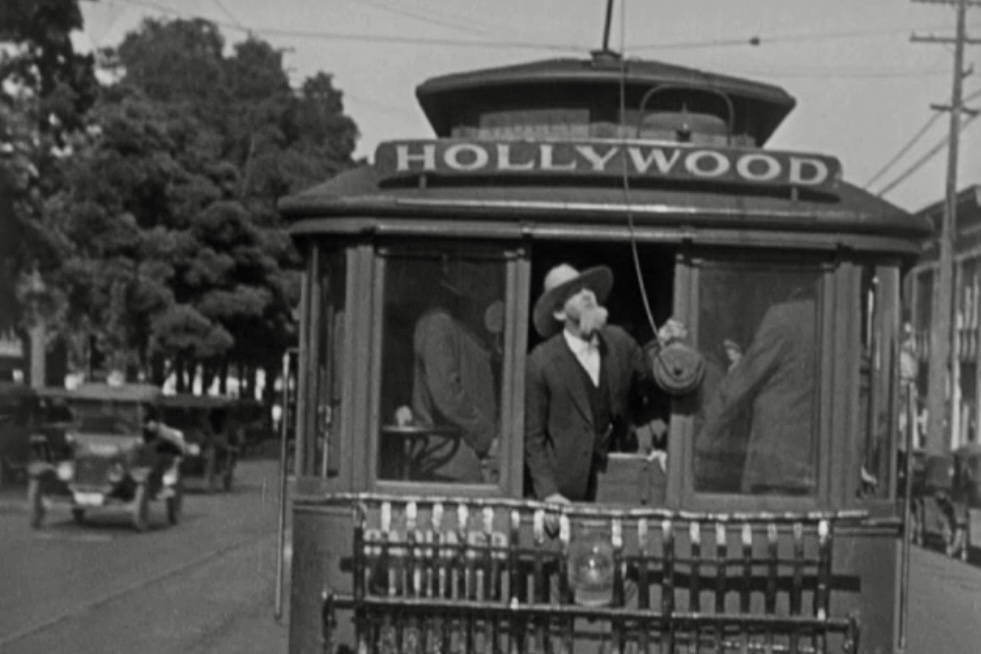
- Screencap from promotional film Hollywood Snapshots (1922)

Overview
- Owner: Southern Pacific Railroad
- Locale: Los Angeles
- Termini: Subway Terminal Building; Beverly Hills
- Stations: 10

Service
- Type: Streetcar
- System: Pacific Electric
- Operator: Pacific Electric
- Rolling stock: Steel 600 Class (last used)

History
- Opened: 1909
- Closed: September 26, 1954

Technical
- Line length: 11.7 mi (18.8 km)
- Track gauge: 4 ft 8 1/2 in (1,435 mm) standard gauge
- Old gauge: narrow gauge
- Electrification: Overhead line, 600 V DC

The Hollywood Line was a local streetcar line of the Pacific Electric Railway. It primarily operated between Downtown Los Angeles and Hollywood, with some trips as far away as Beverly Hills and West Los Angeles. It was the company's busiest route prior to the opening of the Hollywood Subway. Designated as route 32, the line operated from 1909 until 1954.

== History ==
The route was an amalgamation of different railroads. The Cahuenga Valley Railroad built tracks along Hollywood Boulevard between Western and Wilcox in 1888 as part of the company's extension from Western and Santa Monica. The extension to Laurel Canyon after 1892 was opposed by residents, and was built quickly and covertly over a weekend to obviate any action by authorities. The Sunset Boulevard segment was established in 1895 by the Pasadena and Pacific Railroad as a narrow gauge line. Los Angeles Pacific Railway constructed the Melrose Cutoff in 1900, running between Santa Monica Boulevard and Virgil to Prospect Avenue and Vermont Avenue. This was route was largely supplanted in 1905 by the Hollywood Cutoff, which ran from Sanborn Junction northeast to Hollywood and Vermont. Trips though the Hill Street Tunnel began on September 15, 1909, allowing cars a more direct route to Downtown Los Angeles. The route was converted to standard gauge that same year, with five miles (8.0 km) of track relaid to the new gauge the night before the tunnel's opening. The line was acquired by Pacific Electric in 1911 as part of the Great Merger, and the company assumed operations.

Under Pacific Electric, cars ran between the Hill Street Terminal and Gardner Junction (Sunset Boulevard and Gardner Street). Two-thirds of service along Hollywood Boulevard was routed to terminate at Laurel Canyon, except for 1913 when it was one out of three. The Melrose Cutoff was abandoned in 1915. Beginning in 1916, cars were through-routed past the Hill Street Station to serve the Venice Boulevard Local Line — the following year some rush hour trips began terminating at 11th and Hill Street. Laurel Canyon became a shuttle service by 1921 and local cars generally ran as far as Gardner Junction. On February 7, 1926 the route would begin operating with every-other trip terminating at the new Subway Terminal Building, running via the Hollywood Subway. By 1932, both subway and surface trips were operating past Gardner Junction. Between 1941 and 1943, trips on the surface line were through-routed with the Venice Short Line in addition to the Locals. Starting in October 1950, all trips on the line were made to terminate in the subway. Metropolitan Coach Lines acquired the service in 1953 and the final passenger trains ran over the line in the early hours of September 26, 1954. Several bus routes were created or rerouted to replace service in the affected areas.

== Route ==
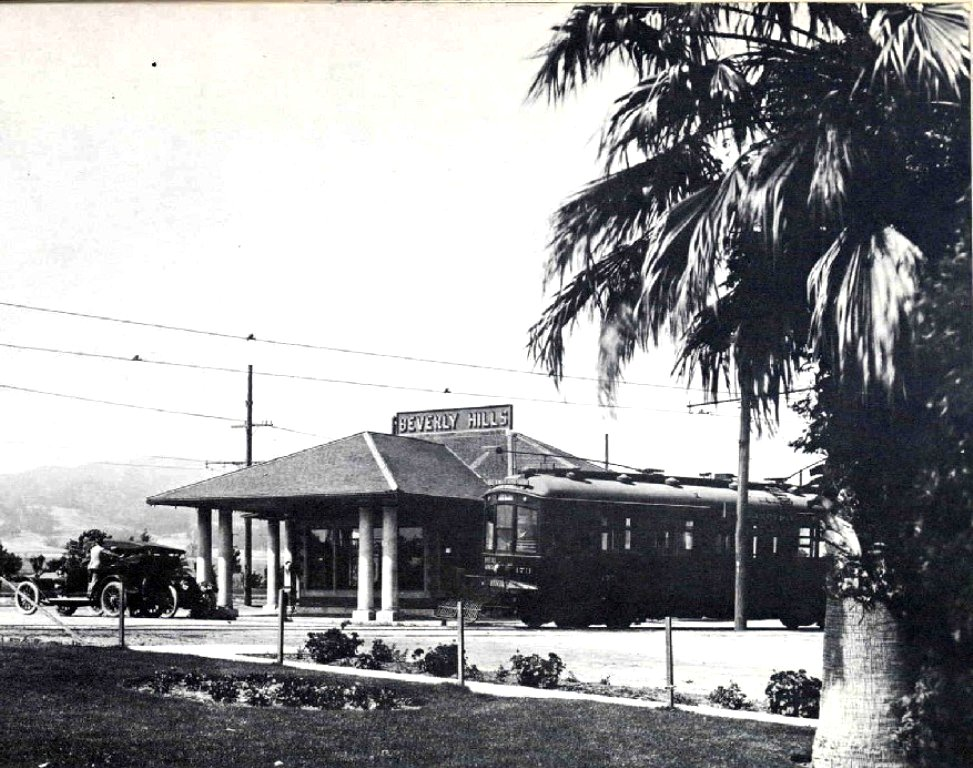
Beverly Hills station, c. 1915–1920

The route began at the Hill Street Station which was located at the site of the Subway Terminal Building, on the west side of Hill Street between 4th and 5th Street. The Red Cars exited the station (or later the Subway Terminal Building) at ground level directly into Hill Street. The dual tracks ran north in the center of the pavement of Hill Street, crossing major intersections in Downtown Los Angeles to reach 1st Street. North of 1st Street was the first of the two tunnels on the route. The dual tracks ran through the first tunnel (under Bunker Hill) to Temple Street, while the Hill Street roadway passed through its own parallel tunnel directly to the east. The rails continued north of Temple Street through the second tunnel (under Fort Moore Hill) to Sunset Boulevard, while Hill Street ran above on a separate alignment.

On Sunset Boulevard, dual tracks ran westerly in the center of the pavement, crossing Grand Avenue, Figueroa Street, and over the Pasadena Freeway. The rails continued in a general northwesterly direction, past Beaudry, Elysian Park and Echo Park Avenues to arrive at Park Avenue, where cars routed through the Subway Terminal turned west into Sunset Boulevard. The line continued northwesterly on Sunset before turning west onto Hollywood Boulevard, then zig-zagged its way southwesterly, primarily on private right-of-way, between La Brea and Fairfax avenues down to Santa Monica Boulevard, continuing down Santa Monica before terminating at PE's Beverly Hills depot located on Canon Drive between "Big" and "Little" Santa Monica boulevards.

=== List of major stations ===
Station	Major connections	Date opened	Date closed	City
Beverly Hills	Coldwater Canyon, Sawtelle, Venice via Hollywood, Westgate	1902	1954	Beverly Hills
Sherman	Sherman, Venice via Hollywood	1902	1955	West Hollywood
Crescent	Sherman, Venice via Hollywood	1902	1955	Los Angeles
Gardner Junction	Laurel Canyon	1902	1955	Los Angeles
Hollywood	Western and Franklin Avenue	1902	1955	Los Angeles
Sunset Junction	Owensmouth, San Fernando, Sherman, Venice via Hollywood, Western and Franklin Avenue	1902	1955	Los Angeles
Subway Terminal Building	Echo Park Avenue, Glendale–Burbank, Owensmouth, Redondo Beach via Playa del Rey, San Fernando, Sawtelle, Sherman, Venice Short Line, Venice via Hollywood, Western and Franklin Avenue, Westgate	1925	1955	Los Angeles

== Rolling stock ==
Class 600 cars were designed and built for the service with the first fifty units from St. Louis Car Company delivered in 1922. These cars would become so closely associated with the Hollywood Line that they quickly acquired the moniker Hollywood cars. Pacific Electric expanded this fleet with fifty more St. Louis Car Company units in 1924, fifty additional units from J.G. Brill Company in 1925, and a final order of ten from St. Louis Car Company in 1928.

== Venice via Hollywood ==
A separate service operated locally all the way through to Venice after Beverly Hills via the Sawtelle Line. Cars on the Venice via Hollywood Line began running out of the Subway in August 1928. This service lasted until August 1941.

== Shuttle routes ==
- The Coldwater Canyon Line ran from Beverly Hills station to the Beverly Hills Hotel by way of Rodeo Drive. It began service under the Los Angeles and Pacific Railway in 1907. Pacific Electric ran through cars to downtown via San Vicente Boulevard and Venice Boulevard no later than October 1912 until October 1916. The shuttle was discontinued in 1923.
- The Laurel Canyon Line ran from Gardner Junction to the foot of Laurel Canyon by way of Sunset Boulevard. The route was originally a steam line of the Cahuenga Valley Railroad. The line was regularly through-routed Downtown until about November 1921 when it became a shuttle route from Laurel Canyon to the main Hollywood line at Gardner Junction. The branch was abandoned in 1924.

== See also ==
- Streetcar suburb
- History of rail transportation in California
