= Subway Terminal Building =

Building in California, United States

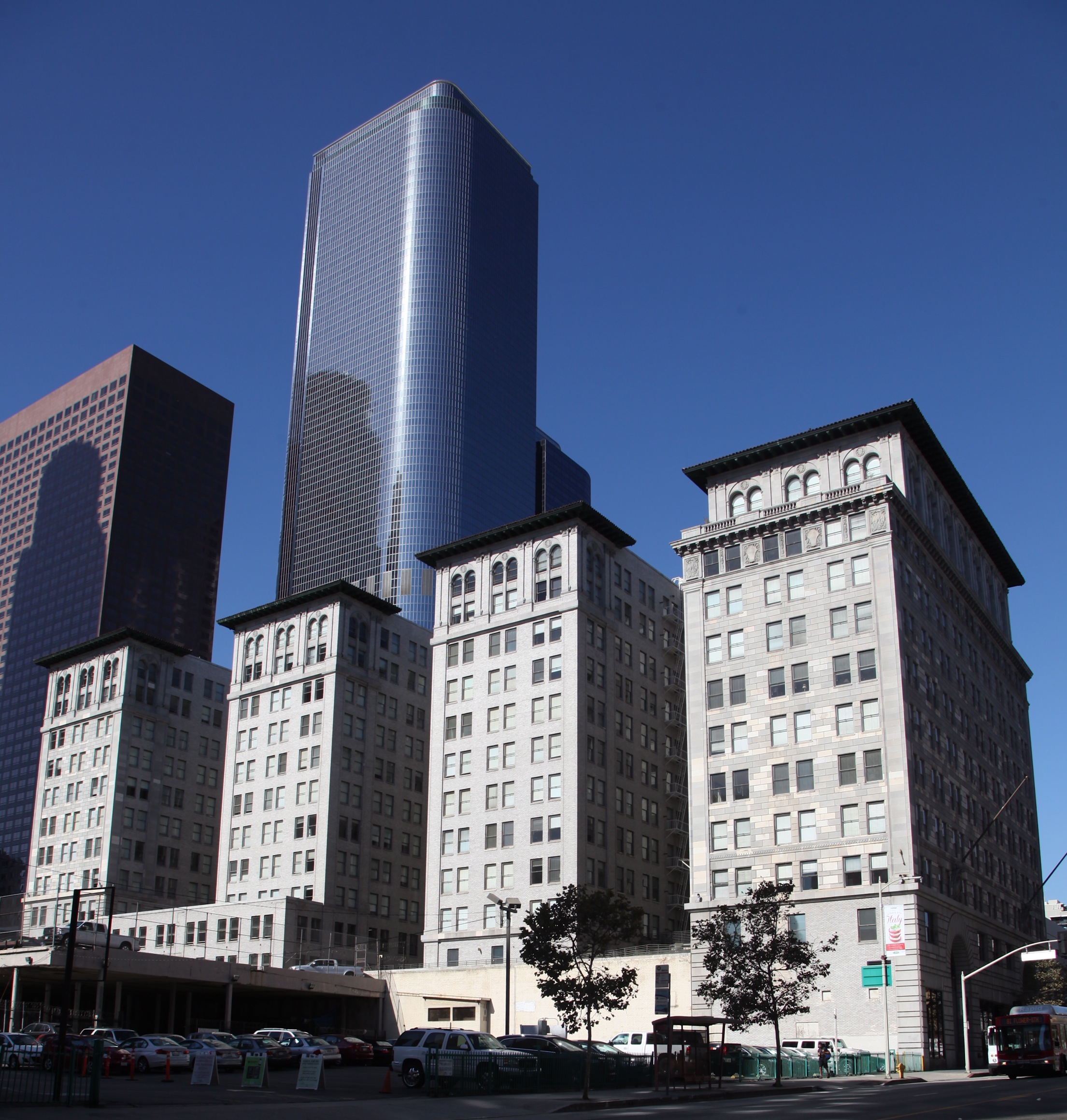
- Subway Terminal Building, 2008

General information
- Location: 417, 415, 425 S. Hill St., 416, 420 424 S. Olive St; Los Angeles, California
- Coordinates: 34.0498689°N 118.2509694°W
- Tracks: 5 (subway)

History
- Opened: March 31, 1908 (Hill Street Station); December 1, 1925 (Subway Terminal)
- Closed: June 19, 1955
Former services
Preceding station	Pacific Electric	Following station
Subway Terminal
Edendale toward Burbank or North Glendale	Glendale–Burbank	Terminus
Sunset Junction toward San Fernando	San Fernando	Terminus
Sunset Junction toward Beverly Hills or Garnder Junction	Hollywood	Terminus
Sunset Junction toward Canoga Park	Owensmouth	Terminus
Sunset Junction toward West Hollywood	Sherman	Terminus
Hill Street station
Vineyard toward Santa Monica	Westgate	Terminus
Vineyard toward Santa Monica	Sawtelle	Terminus
Vineyard toward Rustic Canyon	Venice Short Line	Terminus
Vineyard toward Clifton	Redondo Beach via Playa del Rey	Terminus
Terminus	Echo Park Avenue	Fourth Street toward Echo Park and Cerro Gordo
- Subway Terminal Building
- U.S. National Register of Historic Places
- Los Angeles Historic-Cultural Monument
- Architectural style: Italian Renaissance Revival
- NRHP reference No.: 06000657
- LAHCM No.: 177

Significant dates
- Added to NRHP: August 2, 2006
- Designated LAHCM: July 27, 1977
Track layout
Surface
Subway
- Source
Location

The historic Subway Terminal, now Metro 417, opened in 1925 at 417 South Hill Street near Pershing Square, in the core of Los Angeles as the second, main train station of the Pacific Electric Railway; it served passengers boarding trains for the west and north of Southern California through a mile-long shortcut under Bunker Hill popularly called the "Hollywood Subway," but officially known as the Belmont Tunnel. The station served alongside the Pacific Electric Building at 6th & Main, which opened in 1905 to serve lines to the south and east. The Subway Terminal was designed by Schultze and Weaver in an Italian Renaissance Revival style, and the station itself lay underground below offices of the upper floors, since repurposed into the Metro 417 luxury apartments. When the underground Red Line was built, the new Pershing Square station was cut north under Hill Street alongside the Terminal building, separated from the Subway's east end by just a retaining wall. At its peak in the 20th century, the Subway Terminal served upwards of 20 million passengers a year.

== History ==
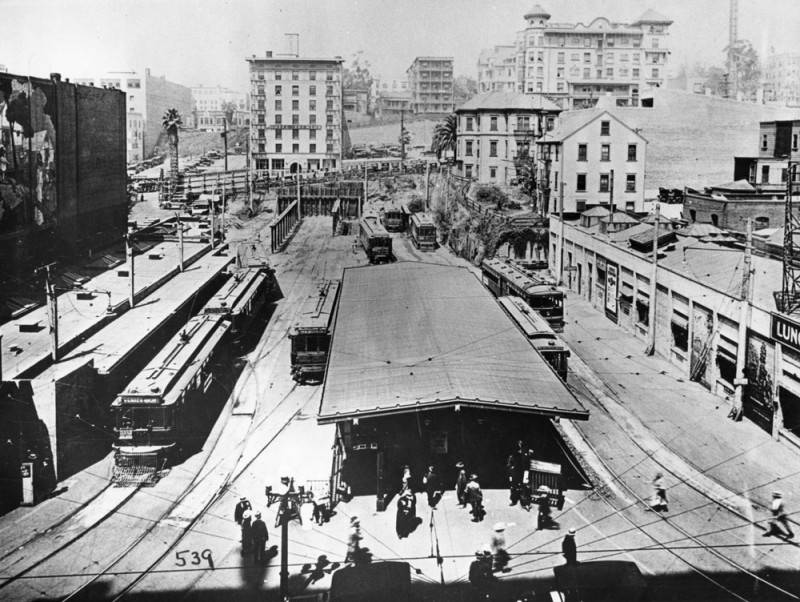
Hill Street Station, c. 1924

=== Hill Street Station ===
The site was established as Hill Street Station, the downtown terminus of the Los Angeles Pacific Railroad which was intended to be temporary until a permanent depot could be erected at the site of the old Masonic Temple. Hill Street began accepting passengers on March 31, 1908 as the streetcar lines to Venice via Hollywood were converted to standard gauge, though the station buildings were not completed for a few more days. It replaced the company's old passenger facilities on 4th Street between Hill and Broadway. Pacific Electric acquired the property along with the railroad's other assets in the Great Merger of 1911, which saw the consolidation of most of the area's local railways.

=== Success ===
As street traffic grew in downtown Los Angeles, the Pacific Electric Railway undertook its most ambitious project, a dedicated right of way into downtown through a tunnel; the first hub, Main Street Station, which served passengers boarding trains to the south and east, was reached by trains sharing the streets.

To loosen traffic congestion that clogged the streets, the California Railroad Commission in 1922 issued Order No. 9928, which called the Pacific Electric to build an electrified tunnel to bypass downtown's busy streets. Plans for the second station for electric trains to the north and west of the region—the “Hollywood Subway”—as the project came to be known, were drafted as early as February 1924, and ground was broken in May of the same year.

After eighteen months of building and $1.25 million spent ($22.9 million adjusted for inflation), the Subway Terminal opened to the public on December 1, 1925.

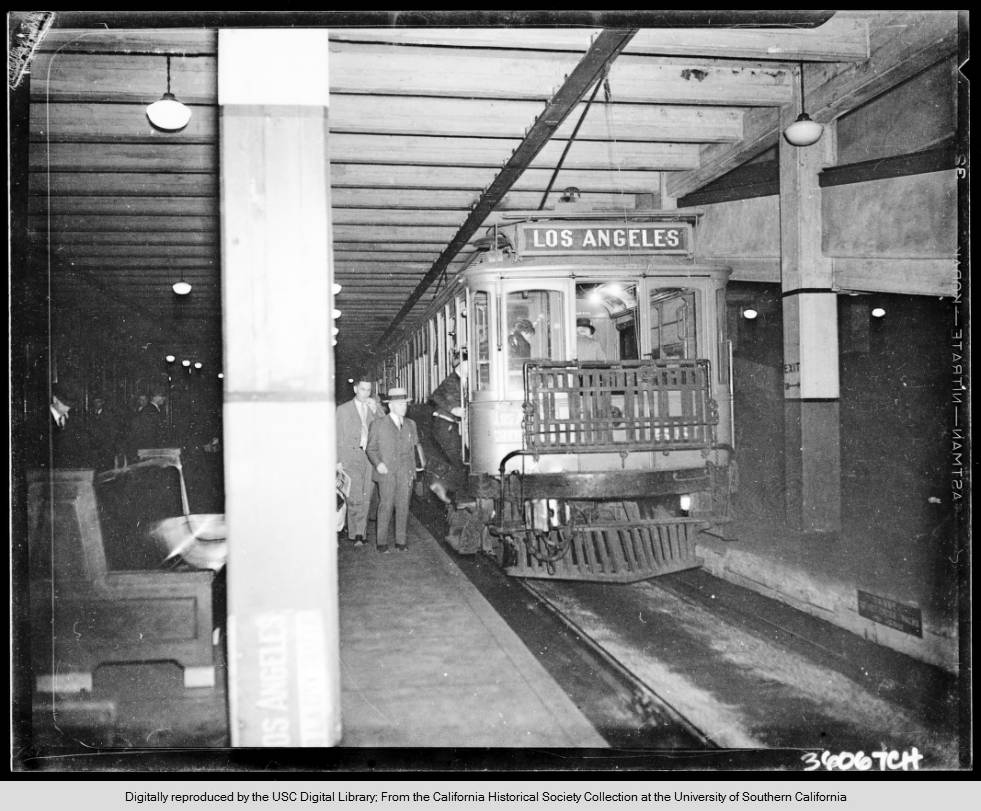
Passengers boarding a train from an underground platform, c. 1930

The Belmont Tunnel, under Bunker and Crown hills, led from the station onto the Toluca Electric Substation and Yard at the Beverley viaduct over Glendale Boulevard, near Westlake and Echo Park. It channeled trains through Westlake to all over Hollywood, Westwood, Santa Monica, North Hollywood, Glendale, Burbank, West Hills, and San Fernando. It cut off seven miles (11 km) or more off similar journeys on rails running along Alameda Street and Exposition Boulevard, which led trains to the other electric train terminal and headquarters, the Pacific Electric Building, from the south and east of Southern California.

Thirty-one feet below Hill Street, the Subway Terminal underground enclosed six platforms, the tower where engineers fetched their schedules, and overhead electric cables that powered the trains. The station lay underneath a waiting room and concessions in a mezzanine level, ticketing and retail shops on the ground floor, and business offices on the upper floors. The station was built in unfinished concrete and fitted with art deco lamps. The mezzanine's waiting room was trimmed in terra cotta tiles and hosted at least one soda fountain and a newspaper stand. On the ground floor, to the back where passages went down to the mezzanine level, columns and recessed ceilings were finished in Italianate styled terra cotta, and front lobbies boasted marble floors and columns, and skylights, in a grand style.

The Subway was widely met with success, as it rivaled Main Street Station as the busiest in Southern California, from the 1920s to the 1950s. Faster than the automobile and at a 6¢ fare ($1.10 adjusted for inflation), ridership reached an all-time high during World War II: in 1944, electric trains carried an estimated 65,000 passengers in and out of the Subway Terminal each day, which adds up to more than 20 million per year.

=== End of electric rail ===
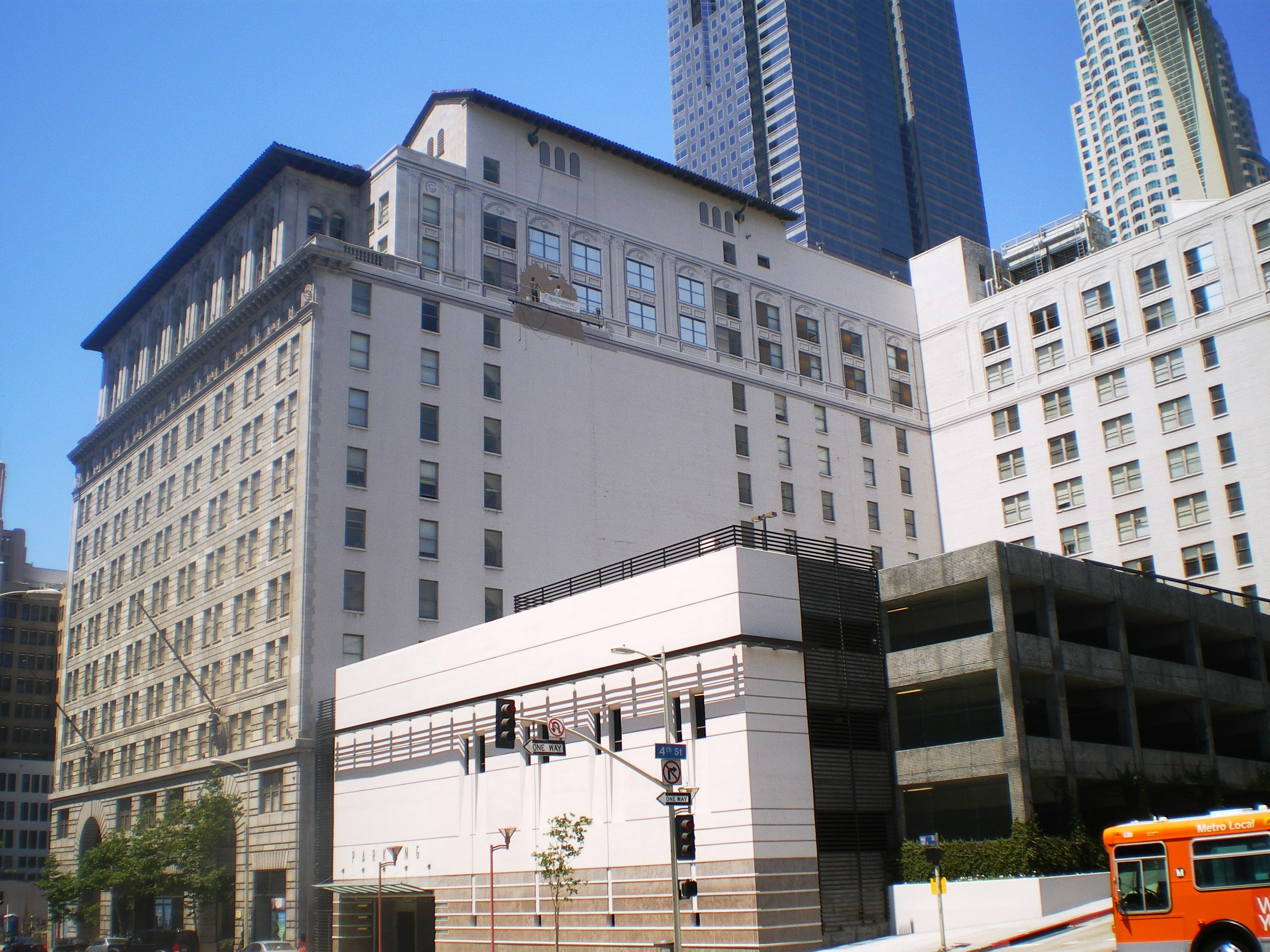
Subway Terminal Building from northeast

After the parent corporation, Southern Pacific Railroad, sold Pacific Electric Railway to Pacific City Lines (a subsidiary of General Motors), trains were replaced with motor buses; Pacific Electric service from the Subway was shut down in 1955. The last electric train to carry passengers, adorned with a banner reading To Oblivion, left the Belmont Tunnel on the morning of June 19, 1955. Shortly thereafter, Southern Pacific lifted the tracks from the yard and tunnel, sealed up the Subway Terminal, disconnected the Toluca Electric Substation, and abandoned the properties.

=== Office building ===
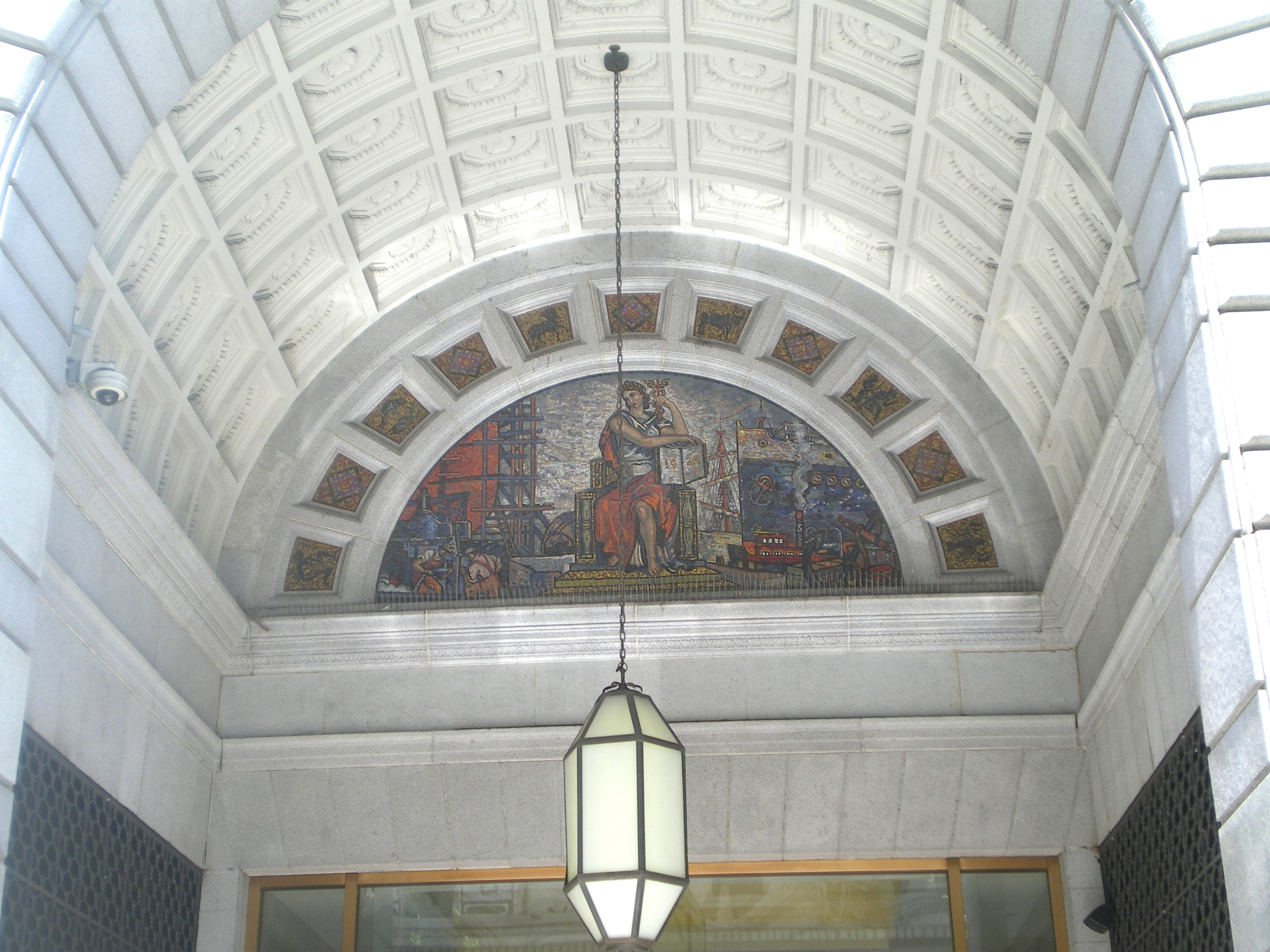
Entrance to Subway Terminal Building before the current owners stripped layers of paint covering the stone.

The upper floors of the Subway Terminal remained as an office building for many years. The tunnel below remained unbreached along its whole length until December 1967, when part of the tunnel under Flower Street was filled in. In 1974, a piling for the Bonaventure Hotel was built through the spot. The tunnel could be seen from the bottom level of the hotel's parking garage, which became an entrance into the eastern half of the tunnel for graffiti artists.

When the Metro Red Line was built underground, Pershing Square station, running north and south under Hill Street, was built at the east end of the old train station, whose tracks ran to the west. The two stations, together forming the shape of a ‘T’, are separated by the eastern wall of the old station.

=== Conversion to Metro 417 ===
In 2007, the Subway Terminal Building, Los Angeles Historic-Cultural Monument #177, was renovated into Metro 417, a luxury apartment building owned by Forest City and built by Swinerton Builders. Concerns were raised for the historic Florentine exterior when a 76-story skyscraper, Park Fifth, was initially proposed on the former site of the Philharmonic Auditorium behind the building. In 2014, the new owner, San Francisco real estate investment firm MacFarlane Partners, announced that the Park Fifth development was going ahead with 650 units in a high-rise apartment building instead. In 2020, an outdoor paseo (path) was built between the new complex and the Metro 417 apartments with tables, chairs, and lighting, preserving the historical setting of Metro 417.

The developers of Metro 417 have exposed the natural stone exterior, stripping off layers of paint. They restored the lobbies to their original showcase conditions in marble and brass and have curated the historic terra cotta trim of the intermediate spaces. The passenger ramps to the train station underground have been dismantled; the station itself has been cut off from the access tunnel and tower by a block curtain wall and is separated from the Pershing Square station by a single structural barrier.

== See also ==
- Pacific Electric Building
