= Beverly Hills station =

Beverly Hills
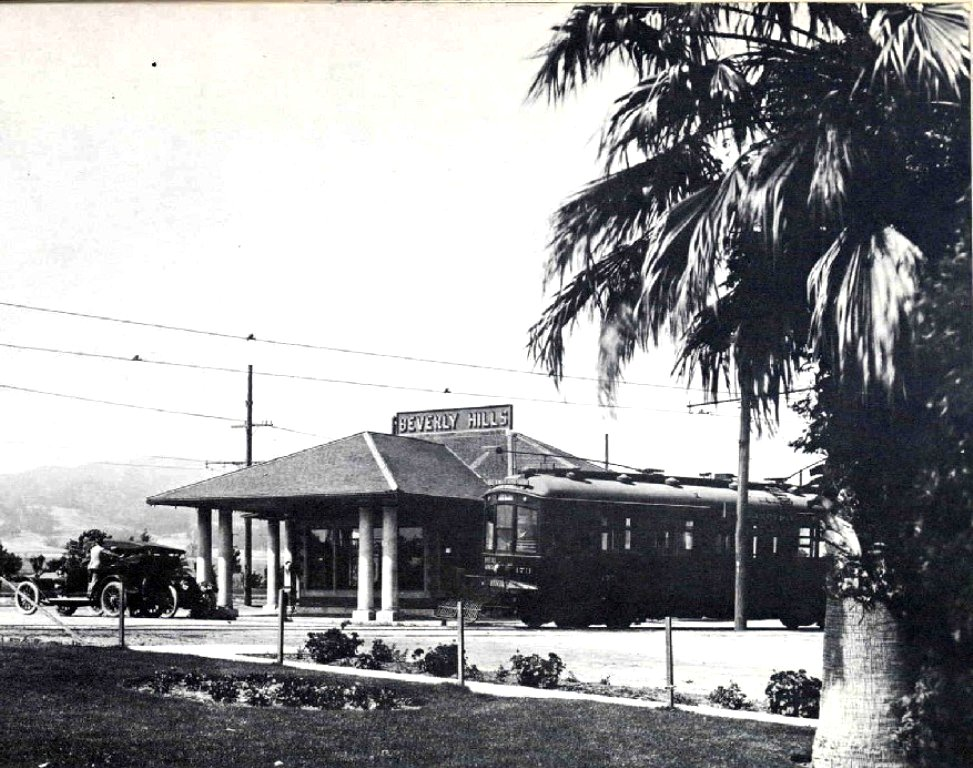
- The first Beverly Hills station, c. 1915–1920

General information
- Location: Santa Monica Boulevard; Beverly Hills, California
- Coordinates: 34.072174°N 118.402449°W
- Tracks: 4

History
- Opened: 1896
- Closed: 1954 (passenger) c. 1960 (freight)
- Rebuilt: 1930
- Former names: Morocco
- Original company: Pasadena and Pacific

Former services
Preceding station	Pacific Electric	Following station
Terminus	Hollywood	Lewis toward Subway Terminal
L.A. Speedway toward Venice	Venice via Hollywood (until 1941)	Lewis toward Hill Street
L.A. Speedway toward Santa Monica	Westgate (until 1940)	Alpers toward Hill Street
L.A. Speedway toward Santa Monica	Sawtelle (until 1940)	Alpers toward Hill Street
Coldwater Canyon Terminus	Coldwater Canyon Line	Terminus
Location

Beverly Hills refers to two railway stations in Beverly Hills, California. With the first constructed in 1896, they came to be served by the Pacific Electric and Southern Pacific railroads until the 1960s. The first station was demolished and replaced with a second across the street.

== History ==
=== First station ===
The first station was built in 1896 as a stop on the Pasadena and Pacific Railway. Initially called Morocco, it was located on the southeast corner of Santa Monica Boulevard and North Cañon Drive. Pacific Electric acquired the station as a result of the Great Merger of 1911 and began operating Red Cars here. The site was sold with the station demolished in 1930 to allow for construction of the Beverly Hills Post Office (later the Wallis Annenberg Center for the Performing Arts).

=== Second station ===
A new station was built across North Cañon Drive, on the southwest corner with Santa Monica Boulevard. The Spanish Baroque-style building was designed by Harry G. Koerner. All passenger service ended by September 1954, and the station building was removed in the 1960s. The final Southern Pacific freight train left Beverly Hills in 1986.
