= Hill Street Tunnel =

Former rail and road tunnel in Los Angeles, California

Hill Street Tunnel referred to a series of rail and road tunnels in Los Angeles, California. Initially constructed to bypass the grades of the street's namesake Bunker Hill, one bore of the dual-bore tunnel served as the roadway of Hill Street while the other facilitated streetcars and interurban trains via a double track dual-gauge railway. One tunnel ran between Temple and 1st Streets.

The rail bore was built by the Los Angeles Pacific Railroad and was opened for traffic on September 15, 1909. The company rebuilt five miles (8.0 km) of their track as standard gauge the night before the tunnel's opening. The new private route cut twelve minutes off the trip to downtown for Hollywood Line and Sherman Line cars. Pacific Electric cars continued through a second tunnel between Temple and Sunset. The roadway bore opened to traffic on September 9, 1913. The Los Angeles Railway ran streetcars through the southern tunnel starting in July 1939.

Rail service through the tunnels was discontinued with the opening of the Hollywood Subway and the Hollywood Freeway. The tunnels and hill itself were leveled by 1955 and the Los Angeles Civic Center was built on the land. The northern tunnel was partially filled with dirt and remained unused until 1967 when part of it was excavated and turned into underground storage for the rebuilt Los Angeles Unified School District offices on the surface. The tunnel served in this capacity until 2003, when the Central Los Angeles High School #9 was built and the tunnel again filled.

== See also ==
- Hollywood Subway
