= Brush Canyon Line =

Pacific Electric streetcar route (1908–1918)

Brush Canyon

Overview
- Owner: Pacific Electric
- Locale: Los Angeles
- Termini: Franklin Avenue & Bronson Avenue; Bronson Canyon
- Stations: 2

Service
- Type: Streetcar
- System: Pacific Electric
- Operator(s): Pacific Electric

History
- Opened: 1908
- Closed: August 6, 1918

Technical
- Line length: 1.56 mi (2.51 km)
- Number of tracks: 1
- Track gauge: 4 ft 8 1/2 in (1,435 mm) standard gauge
- Old gauge: 3 ft 6 in (1,067 mm)
- Electrification: Overhead line, 600 V DC

The Brush Canyon Line was a short-lived Pacific Electric streetcar branch line in Los Angeles. Brush Canyon is now generally known as Bronson Canyon.

== Route ==
The line branched from the Western & Franklin Ave. Line at Franklin & Bronson Avenue to travel north on Bronson to a rock quarry. Roughly an additional mile of track extended into the quarry site.

== History ==
The line was built by the Los Angeles Pacific Railroad in 1908 as a single-track narrow gauge branch — it was converted to standard gauge later the same year. It was primarily used to access the gravel and rock quarry at Brush Canyon. Pacific Electric took over the service in 1911 and operated the line as a shuttle. Service was abandoned on August 6, 1918.

While passenger service was provided, this branch line was primarily used for freight to carry rocks used to pave Sunset Boulevard, Highland Avenue, Adams Boulevard, West 6th Street, and Wilshire Boulevard in addition to track ballast for most Western District lines.

== See also ==
- Streetcar suburb
- History of rail transportation in California
