= Cahuenga Valley Railroad =

The Cahuenga Valley Railroad was an early railroad in Los Angeles, California. It was built to open up real estate developments in the area. The narrow gauge line opened for passenger service on August 12, 1888 between Diamond Street, at the terminal of the Second Street Cable Railway, to the foot of the Cahuenga Pass. The company built its first flat car in house and began accepting freight shipments that month. Trains ran for a while, but were ceased after September 1889 when it was found that the Los Angeles City Council did not have the authority to grant franchises for steam railroads.

After changing ownership in 1891, the track was renewed with new trestles built and an attempt was made to restart passenger services. The road was given the new moniker of the Nickel Plate Railway, with service restarting on June 5, 1891. The line was shut down early the following year after the locomotives became inoperable.

Regular service resumed in April 1893, though the company would go on to acquire several experimental locomotives. A new gas-electric locomotive was delivered in August, though this proved inadequate. Finally, the company acquired a locomotive from the Baldwin Locomotive Works and was able to resume regular trips in February 1894.

The Pasadena and Pacific Railway purchased the line in 1896. Part of the line was electrified and incorporatee into the Hollywood Line. The right of way was then absorbed into the Pacific Electric Railway in the Great Merger of 1911. It continued service as the Laurel Canyon Line.
