= Venice Short Line =

Los Angeles streetcar route (1897–1950)

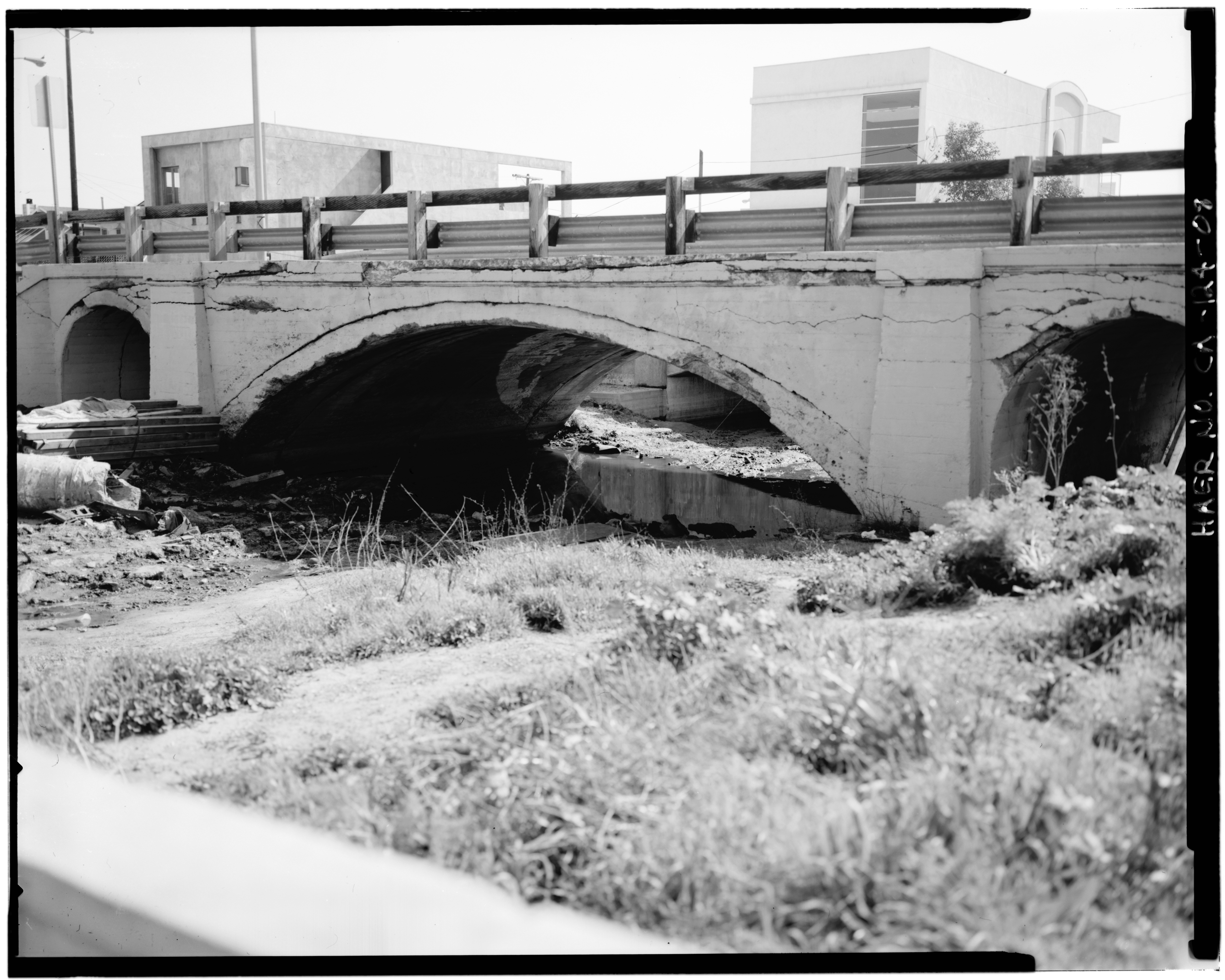

Overview
- Owner: Southern Pacific Railroad
- Locale: Los Angeles
- Termini: Subway Terminal Building; Santa Monica, California
- Stations: 19

Service
- Type: Interurban
- System: Pacific Electric
- Operator(s): Pacific Electric

History
- Opened: 1897 (to Vineyard); 1903 (to Venice)
- Closed: December 28, 1950

Technical
- Track gauge: 4 ft 8 1/2 in (1,435 mm) standard gauge
- Old gauge: 3 ft 6 in (1,067 mm)
- Electrification: Overhead line, 600 V DC

The Venice Short Line was a Pacific Electric (PE) interurban railway line in Los Angeles which traveled from downtown Los Angeles to Venice, Ocean Park, and Santa Monica via Venice Boulevard. The route was especially busy on Sundays, as Venice was PE's most popular beachfront destination.

== History ==
The part of the line from the Hill Street station to Vineyard was originally built in 1897 by the Pasadena and Pacific Electric Railway Company. The line from Vineyard to Venice was constructed in 1903 by Los Angeles-Pacific Railroad (LAP). A controlling interest in LAP was sold to Southern Pacific interests in 1906, whereupon the track gauge was converted from 42 inch to standard. In 1911, LAP was consolidated into the new Pacific Electric Railway.

When Pacific Electric took over operations, cars ran between Hill Street Depot and Ocean at Broadway in Santa Monica via Venice Boulevard and Pacific. For two months starting in December 1926, the line was through-routed with the Santa Monica via Beverly Hills Line, creating a loop service. Starting in July 1930, a single early morning outbound trip was routed beyond Venice to Redondo Beach, lasting until May 1940. Between February 1941 and April 1943, routing was instituted with the surface Hollywood Line trips. Following World War II, a series of service reductions portended the line's demise. Passenger service ended on December 28, 1950, and the route was thereupon converted to motor coach operations. All rails had been removed or paved over by 1981.

== Route ==
The line originated in Downtown Los Angeles at the Subway Terminal Building. The Red Cars exited the station at ground level directly onto Hill Street. The dual tracks ran south in the middle of Hill Street, crossing major intersections such as 6th Street, Olympic Boulevard, and Pico Boulevard, until the line turned west onto Venice Boulevard.

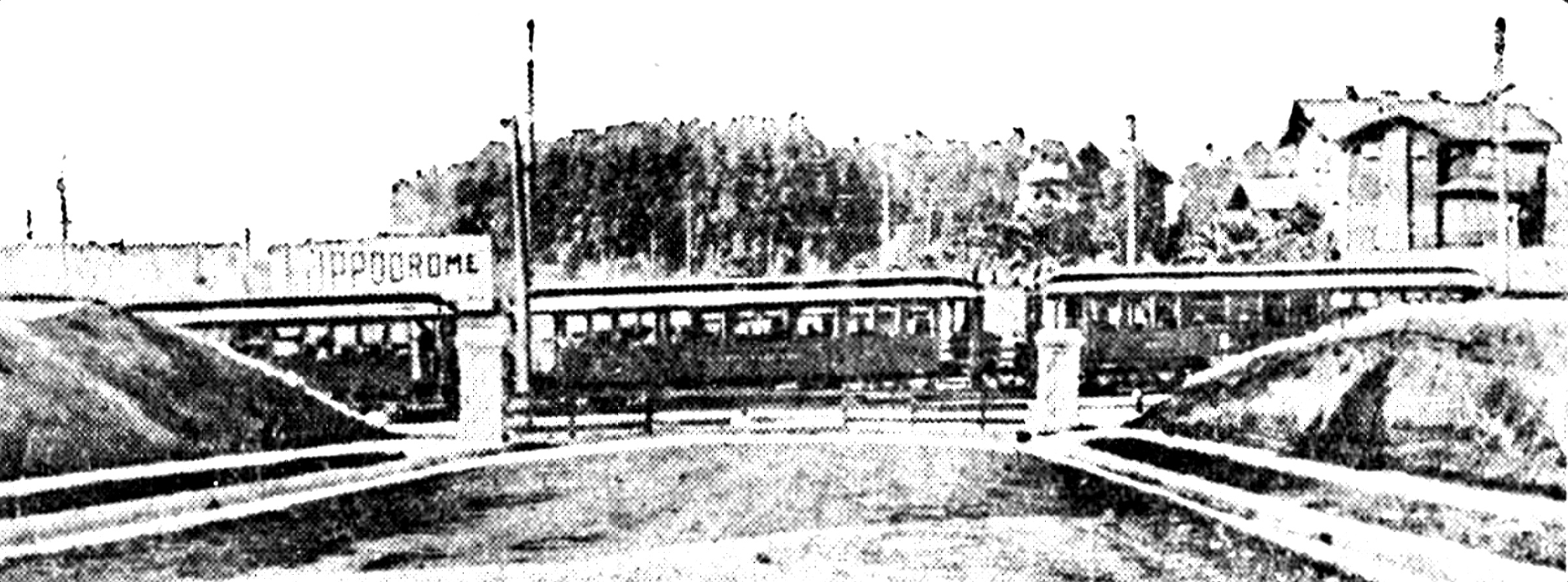
A proposed level crossing at the Pacific Electric tracks (today's Venice Boulevard) would result in "the worst death trap in Los Angeles," a traffic engineer warned in 1915, because of the impaired view of the railway from West Boulevard on both sides. A viaduct was built instead, in 1920. The line of trees to the north is probably where the Queen Anne Recreation Center is today, in Mid-Wilshire.

On Venice Boulevard, the dual tracks located in the middle of the paved street continued westward, passing major streets such as Figueroa, Hoover, and Vermont, until the Berendo Street siding track, which allowed passing of other Red Cars. Upon leaving the siding, the tracks continued on the middle of Venice Boulevard, passing Normandie and Western until the line reached Arlington Avenue. At Arlington, the tracks then entered an unpaved private right of way in the center of dual roadways, which ended at Crenshaw Boulevard. From Crenshaw Boulevard, the dual tracks entered another section of private way located on the north side of Venice Boulevard and continued to Vineyard Avenue. It was here that the Sawtelle Line branched northwesterly to Beverly Hills. West of Vineyard Avenue, Venice Boulevard became a split roadway with the dual tracks located on a private way between the roadways. The Venice Short Line continued westerly crossing over La Cienega Boulevard passing the Helms Bakery on its way to Culver Junction which is westerly of Exposition Boulevard. It is at the Junction that the Redondo Beach via Playa del Rey Line branched southwesterly and the Santa Monica Air Line crossed.

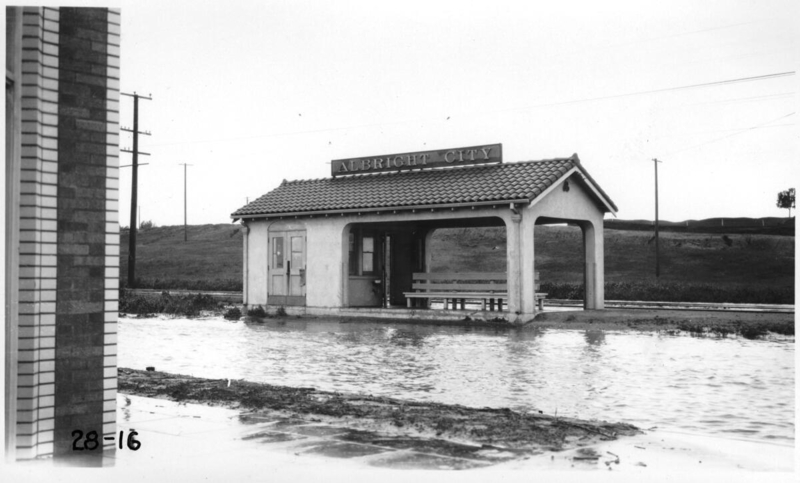
Albright City stop at flooded intersection of Venice & Sawtelle, 1928

The dual tracks continued westerly from the Junction on unpaved private way in the center of Venice Boulevard, passing intersections such as Overland Avenue, Sepulveda Boulevard, Centinela Avenue, Lincoln Boulevard, and Washington Boulevards. The line then crossed the Grand Canal in Venice on a concrete arch bridge and turned north onto Pacific Avenue. After the line's closure, the right-of-way in the center of Venice Boulevard sat vacant and was used as an unpaved parking lot. In the 1970s, Venice Boulevard was reconfigured, straightening the roadway and converting the derelict right of way into vehicle travel lanes and a median. Traces of the former alignment remain just east of Overland, where sidewalks and buildings along the north side of Venice Boulevard align to the old width of the road, with the space between the old and new roadway filled in with parking lots.

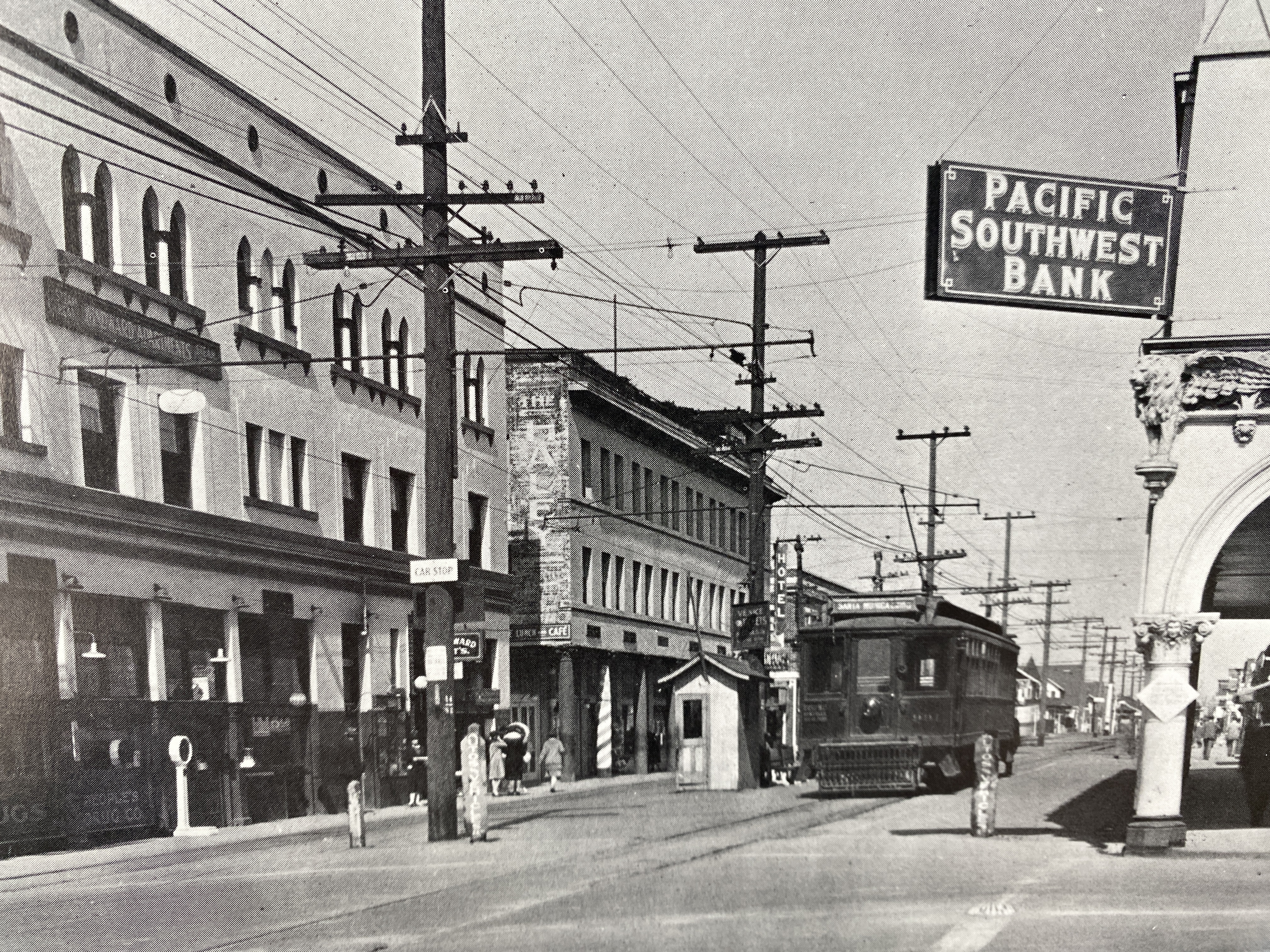
A Santa Monica-bound Pacific Electric car on Trolleyway, date unknown

The double tracks then ran on the pavement of Pacific Avenue for five blocks before entering a wide private way known then as the "Trolleyway". From Windward Avenue in Venice, the line followed the "Trolleyway" north, past the Ocean Park Carhouse and yard, through Ocean Park to Pico Boulevard, where the "Trolleyway" ended and street running resumed directly into Ocean Avenue. The tracks then followed Ocean Avenue north to the terminus of the Venice Short Line at Broadway in Santa Monica. Following the abandonment of the line, "Trolleyway" was paved and converted into a street, today called Pacific Avenue in Venice and Neilson Way in Santa Monica.

== Infrastructure ==
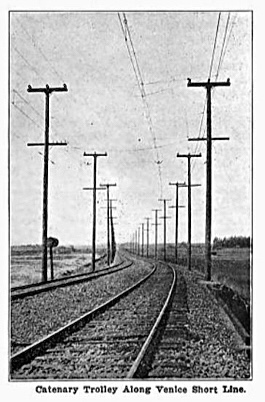
Catenary trolley on Venice Short Line (1912)

Power was provided via the Ivy Substation at 600 volts direct current.

== Rolling stock ==
When Pacific Electric took over the line in 1911, they assigned 800 and 550 Class cars to the service.

The Venice Short Line was one of the few Pacific Electric services to utilize PCC streetcars, which ran over the line between February 1941 and April 1943.

== See also ==
- Streetcar suburb
- List of California railroads
- History of rail transportation in California
