= Western and Franklin Avenue Line =

Former streetcar route in Los Angeles, California

Western & Franklin Ave.
- Dash sign used on Hollywood bound trains

Overview
- Owner: Pacific Electric
- Locale: Los Angeles
- Termini: 11th & Hill Streets; Hollywood & Vine Blvds
- Stations: 19

Service
- Type: Streetcar
- System: Pacific Electric
- Operator(s): Pacific Electric
- Ridership: 1,935,583 (1926)

History
- Opened: 1908
- Closed: March 17, 1940

Technical
- Line length: 9.08 mi (14.61 km)
- Number of tracks: 2
- Track gauge: 4 ft 8 1/2 in (1,435 mm) standard gauge
- Old gauge: 3 ft 6 in (1,067 mm)
- Electrification: Overhead line, 600 V DC

The Western and Franklin Avenue Line was a Pacific Electric streetcar line which traveled from Los Angeles to Hollywood. It operated from 11th and Hill Streets via Hill, Sunset, Santa Monica Boulevard, Western Avenue, Franklin Avenue, Argyle Avenue, Yucca Street, and Vine Street to end at Hollywood and Vine Boulevards. It operated from 1908 to 1940. The Brush Canyon Line branched from this line at Bronson.

== History ==
The line up Western Avenue was established by the Cahuenga Valley Railroad, a steam line, in 1888. The Los Angeles Pacific Railroad requested a franchise to run streetcars on Western and Franklin Avenues in 1907, with service beginning the following spring. Just a month after cars began running, the track gauge was widened to standard. Double tracking on Western Avenue was completed in 1910 and the line was acquired by Pacific Electric in 1911 as part of the Great Merger.

Some outbound trips continued west on Hollywood Boulevard to terminate at the West Hollywood station following PE's acquisition, though this ended by 1912. Between February 1922 and July 1924 the route operated as a shuttle service between Santa Monica/Western and Hollywood/Vine. Service was suspended from July 1924 to the following January owing to power issues throughout the system. Through-routing to the downtown terminal was reestablished upon resumption of service, though it had been reduced to rush hours only by October 1932 and the line was through-routed with the Venice Boulevard Local. Cars were terminating at Hill and 11th by 1935, and shuttle service on the outer segment of the line returned in 1938.

Service was discontinued on March 17, 1940.

== See also ==
- Streetcar suburb
- Streetcars in North America
- List of California railroads
- History of rail transportation in California
