= Redondo Beach via Playa del Rey Line =

Historic streetcar line in California

Redondo Beach via Playa del Rey
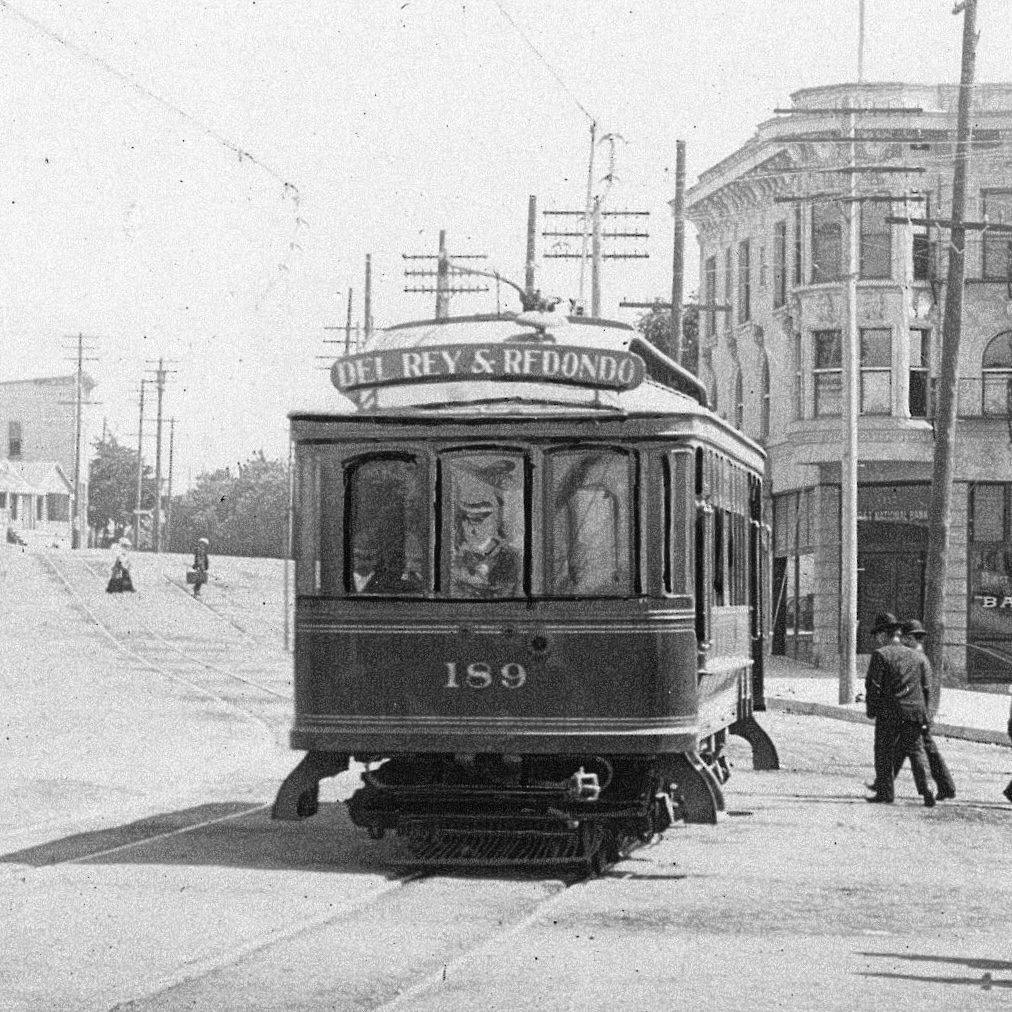
- Del Rey & Redondo (1915)

Overview
- Locale: Greater Los Angeles
- Termini: Downtown Los Angeles; Redondo Beach

Service
- Type: Interurban
- System: Pacific Electric
- Operator(s): Pacific Electric

History
- Opened: November 9, 1902
- Closed: May 12, 1940

Technical
- Line length: 25.01 mi (40.25 km)
- Number of tracks: 2
- Track gauge: 1,435 mm (4 ft 8 1/2 in) standard gauge
- Electrification: Overhead line, 600 V DC

The Redondo Beach via Playa del Rey was an interurban railway route of the Pacific Electric. It operated between the Hill Street Terminal and Cliffton, south of Redondo Beach, through the company's Western Division.

The route ran along the coastline of the Santa Monica Bay uninterrupted from Playa Del Rey to the northern edge of the Palos Verdes Peninsula. Despite the obvious desirability of the route, which connected all of the beachfront communities to one another and to the urban core, it was mostly never replaced with alternative types of transit. Portions of local bus routes run by various local agencies, including Culver CityBus and Beach Cities Transit serve some parts of the former route, but no regular, continuous service exists down the length of the South Bay coastline. The former route is, however, mostly traversable by bike since some of the portion along Culver Boulevard has been converted into a bike trail, and the Marvin Braude Bike Trail roughly parallels the former route and in many places runs on the former right of way.

== History ==
The route began as the Los Angeles-Hermosa Beach & Redondo Railway Company, which was succeeded quickly by the Los Angeles Pacific Railroad. The first train ran from Culver City to Playa del Rey on Sunday, November 9, 1902. The Manhattan Beach to Redondo Beach segment was constructed in 1903, and the gap between the two was also completed later that year. Culver Boulevard, originally called Speedway, was laid out in parallel to the rail line beginning in 1904.

Circa 1903, "First car leaves 6:40 a.m., last car 11:40 p.m." The Los Angeles Pacific depot was located at 316 W. 4th Street.

The tracks were converted from their original narrow gauge to standard gauge in 1908. Los Angeles Pacific built a rail spur for the Los Angeles Motordrome around 1910.

Pacific Electric acquired the line in 1911.

Local Manhattan–Redondo service was established for the summer and fall of 1916 and made year round runs from February 1922 to June 1924, extending to Clifton in 1923. A spur existed from approximately 1920 to 1927 that allowed Barnes Circus trains access to their winter quarters at Barnes City.

The Palos Verdes Transportation Company began a bus service between Malaga Cove and the Redondo Beach station in 1925.

On May 5, 1930 service was reduced to a single reverse commute round trip car run to maintain the franchise. The route was discontinued after November 18.

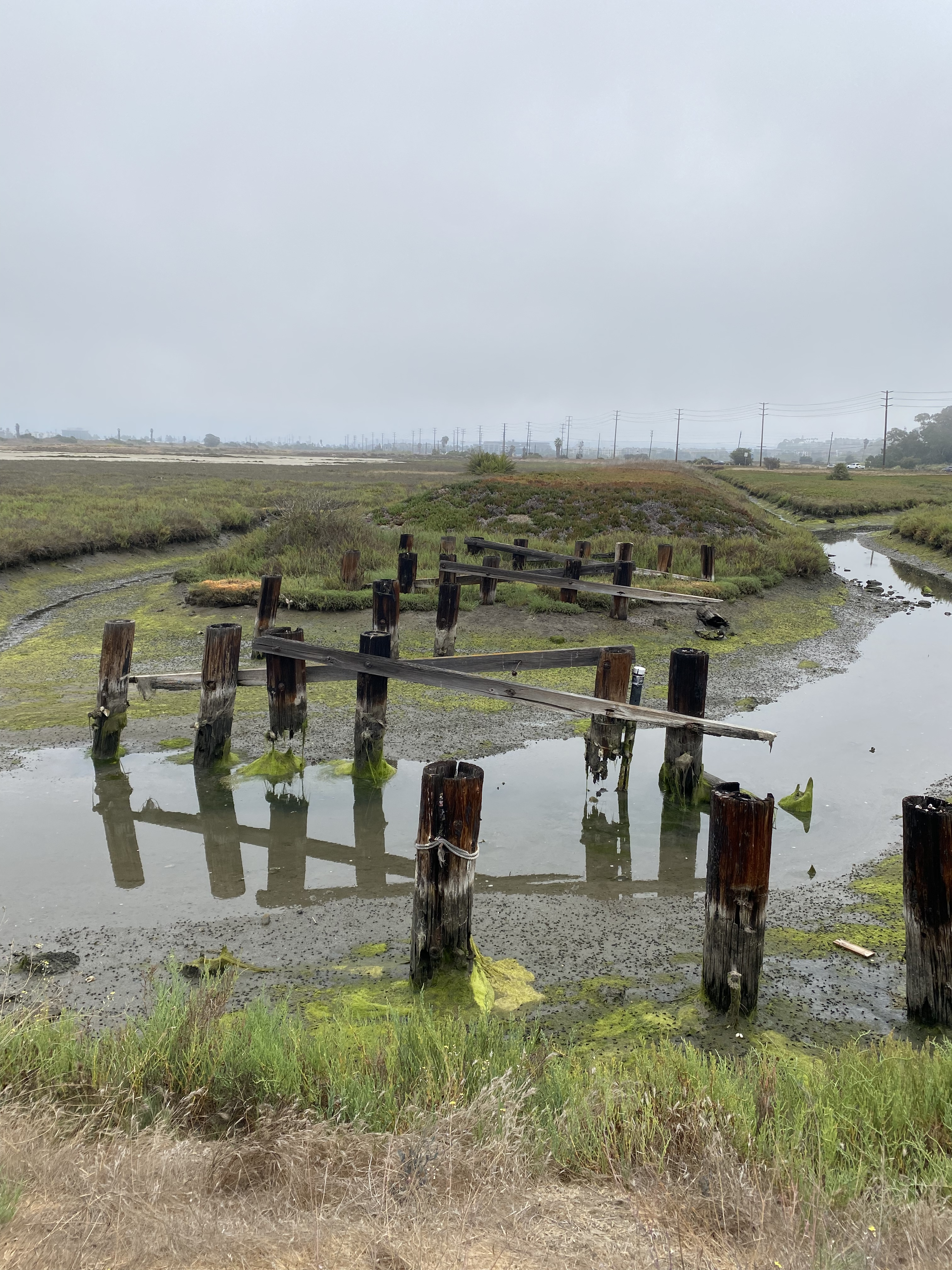
Ruins of the route through Ballona Wetlands (2022)

By 1981, no rails remained on the entire route. Much of the route in Culver City and West Los Angeles on Culver Boulevard was converted into the Culver Boulevard Median Bike Path.

== Route ==
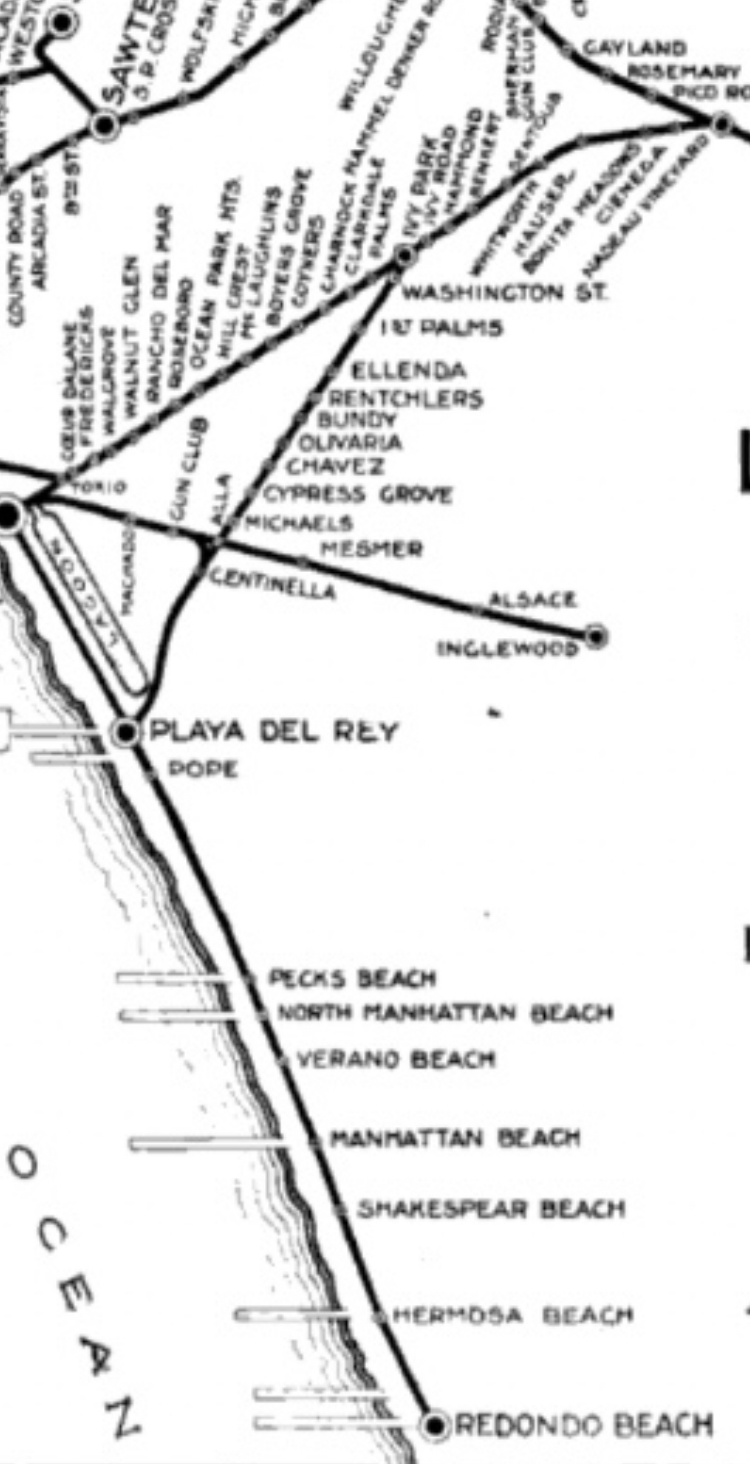
Redondo Beach via Playa Del Rey route map and stops c. 1906

From the Hill Street Station to Culver Junction, the Redondo Beach via Playa del Rey Line followed the route of the Venice Short Line. From Culver Junction, dual tracks branched southwesterly from the Venice Short Line in the center of the pavement of Culver Boulevard, past Washington Boulevard to Madison Avenue.

Here, the dual tracks entered an unimproved private way on the northerly side of Culver Boulevard, and ran past the MGM Studios, Overland Avenue, Sepulveda Boulevard and Centinela Boulevard, to the Culver City boundary.

The dual tracks in private way continued southeasterly alongside of Culver Boulevard approximately one-half mile (0.80 km) before ramping up on fill to cross over Lincoln Boulevard on a bridge immediately north of the bridge for Culver Boulevard roadway. West of Lincoln Boulevard, the dual tracks converged to a single track before crossing over Ballona Creek on a long steel bridge.

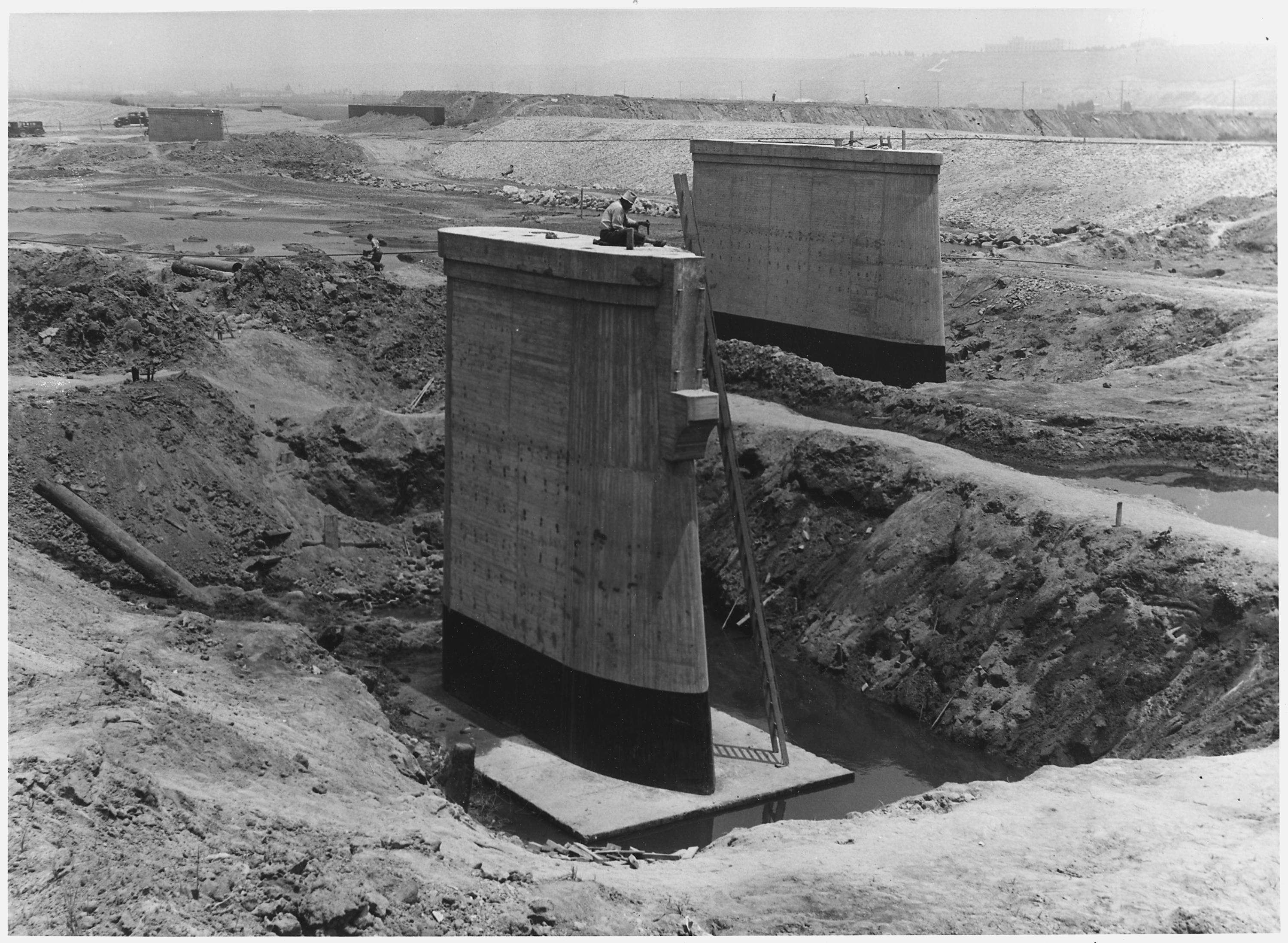
Reconstruction of Ballona Creek rail crossing (1937), Culver Boulevard automobile bridge is to the left; camera is facing north toward Westchester, note "L" for Loyola Marymount University is visible on bluffs

The single track then expanded again to two tracks in private way and continued the run across open country roughly paralleling Culver Boulevard, into Playa Del Rey. The rails had a short stretch of street running in Playa Del Rey in crossing Culver Boulevard and a small section on Vista Del Mar Lane.

From Playa del Rey, the dual rails ran southerly on unimproved private way along the edge of the bluffs bordering the Pacific Ocean, past the Hyperion Sewage Treatment Plant and Imperial Highway into the City of El Segundo. Still on unimproved private way bordering the ocean, the dual tracks continued southerly running by the Standard Oil Company Refinery, the City of Manhattan Beach, and into the city of Hermosa Beach.

In Hermosa Beach, the dual rails entered another section of unimproved private way in the center of Hermosa Avenue. The rails followed this private way southerly through the business district of Hermosa Beach into the City of Redondo Beach to the center of the city at Diamond and Pacific Avenues. Here, the Redondo Beach via Gardena Line terminated its run from the east.

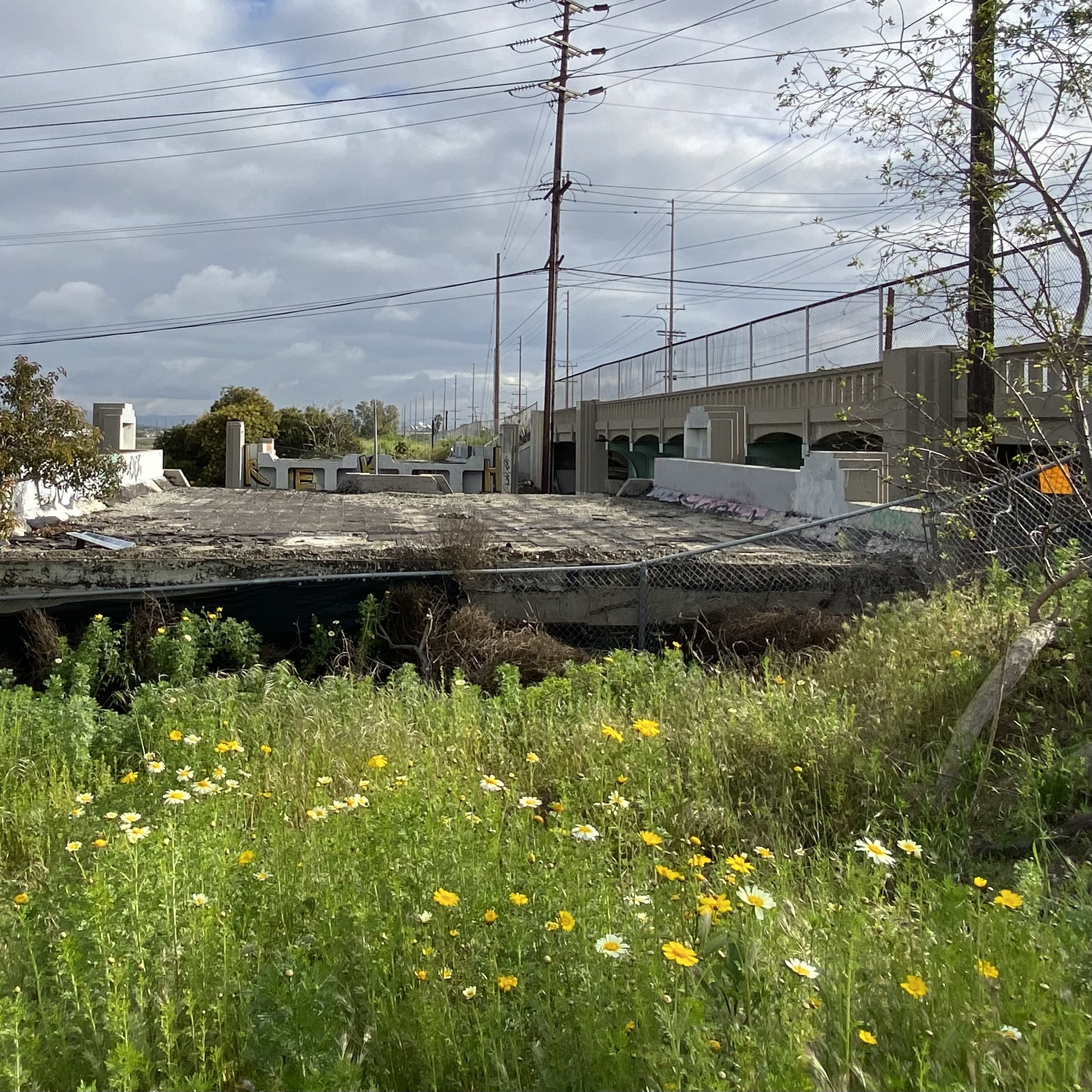
Railway bridge remnant over Lincoln Blvd.

From Downtown Redondo Beach, the dual tracks ran southerly, in the pavement of Pacific Avenue as far as Torrance Boulevard, then they ran in another unimproved private way in the center of Catalina Street south to Avenue I in the Clifton Beach Area. The dual tracks then converged to a single track for the short cross country run on private way to the terminus of the Line at Clifton-by-the-Sea, located on the bluff overlooking the Ocean just north of Malaga Cove.
