= South Hollywood–Sherman Line =

Pacific Electric street car line (1896–1953)

South Hollywood–Sherman

Overview
- Owner: Southern Pacific Railroad
- Locale: Los Angeles
- Termini: Hill Street Station; West Hollywood
- Stations: 8

Service
- Type: Light rail
- System: Pacific Electric
- Operator(s): Pacific Electric
- Rolling stock: Steel 600 Class (last used)
- Ridership: 5,314,149 (last counting)

History
- Opened: 1896
- Closed: May 31, 1953

Technical
- Line length: 9.84 mi (15.84 km)
- Track gauge: 1,435 mm (4 ft 8 1/2 in) standard gauge
- Electrification: Overhead line, 600 V DC

The South Hollywood–Sherman Line was a suburban route of the Pacific Electric Railway. The line ran between Downtown Los Angeles and the suburb of Sherman (present-day West Hollywood). The line was named after Moses Sherman, who built the line and the Sherman street car yard on the line in West LA. The large 5.56-acre (2.25 ha) rail facility was on Santa Monica Boulevard just west of La Cienega Boulevard. The yard had a steam power house, a car barn and a shop building. (Pacific Electric would go on to move the yard works to 7th and Central in Los Angeles.)

== History ==
Construction of the narrow-gauge Pasadena and Pacific Electric Railroad to Santa Monica via Colegrove began on June 11, 1895, with Eli P. Clark serving as contractor, using the roadbed of the old Elysian Park Street Railway and the Los Angeles and Pacific Railway. They negotiated an agreement with Los Angeles Railway to use that company’s track to enter the downtown area. Car shops and a rail yard were built midway between Los Angeles and Santa Monica, in an area they named Sherman. Santa Monica promoters Robert S. Baker and Senator John P. Jones provided 225 acres (91 ha) near the Soldier’s Home, and Sherman and Clark sold it to raise funds for construction. The property became part of Sawtelle. On April 1, 1896, the first car entered into Santa Monica, where its arrival was celebrated.

Pasadena and Pacific became part of the Los Angeles Pacific Railroad. Cars began service through the Hill Street Tunnel on September 15, 1909, providing for a faster trip into downtown.

Los Angeles Pacific was folded into the new Pacific Electric Railway in the Great Merger of 1911. A single daily round trip on the line began running through to Venice in 1914, which was extended to Ocean Park in 1922. Starting on February 7, 1926, the service began running through the Hollywood Subway. In the 1930s buses started to run from the West Hollywood depot also.

The trip to Venice was discontinued shortly before May 1938. Some trips west of Highland Parkway was converted to a shuttle service starting in May 1948. Passenger service totally ended on May 31, 1953. In 1974 all the rail buildings were demolished for development.

== Route ==
The South Hollywood–Sherman Line followed the Glendale–Burbank Line as far as Park Junction, located on Glendale Boulevard one block south of Sunset Boulevard. Here at the present location of Park Avenue opposite Angeles Temple, the South Hollywood–Sherman branched left to climb up a slight grade in a private right of way (later paved as Park Avenue, with tracks in the center) to turn left (west) into Sunset Boulevard.

The dual tracks ran westerly and then northwesterly, running in the middle of Sunset Boulevard, crossing such major intersections as Alvarado Street and Silverlake Boulevard, to reach Sanborn Junction, where the line branched left (west) into Santa Monica Boulevard.

On Santa Monica Boulevard, the dual tracks in the center of the pavement headed west, passing such major streets as, Vermont Avenue, Western Avenue, and Vine Street in Hollywood. Leaving Vine Street, the tracks continued west past Highland Avenue (where the San Fernando Valley Line branched north), and La Brea Avenue, to Crescent Junction. Crescent Junction, located near Fairfax Avenue, is where the Hollywood Line joined the South Hollywood–Sherman.

Leaving Crescent Junction, the dual tracks continued west in the pavement of Santa Monica Boulevard, passing Crescent Heights Boulevard to Hacienda Park (two blocks east of La Cienega Boulevard) here, the tracks entered an unimproved private way between the dual roadways of Santa Monica Boulevard, ran southwesterly across La Cienega Boulevard, and then four blocks farther to the terminus of the route at Sherman (West Hollywood). The dual rails turned southerly out of the private way into the West Hollywood Carhouse and shops (located on the south side of Santa Monica Boulevard between Huntley Drive and San Vicente Boulevard).

== See also ==
- Streetcar suburb
- List of California railroads
- History of rail transportation in California
