= Echo Park Avenue Line =

Pacific Electric streetcar line (1899–1950)

Echo Park Avenue

Overview
- Owner: Pacific Electric
- Locale: Los Angeles
- Termini: 11th & Hill Streets; Cerro Gordo Street

Service
- Type: Streetcar
- System: Pacific Electric
- Operator(s): Pacific Electric

History
- Opened: 1889
- Closed: December 28, 1950

Technical
- Line length: 4.56 mi (7.34 km)
- Number of tracks: 1
- Track gauge: 4 ft 8 1/2 in (1,435 mm) standard gauge
- Old gauge: 3 ft 6 in (1,067 mm) until 1909
- Electrification: Overhead line, 600 V DC

The Echo Park Avenue Line was a Pacific Electric streetcar line in Los Angeles. The railway traveled from 11th and Hill Streets in downtown Los Angeles along the Hollywood Line to Sunset Boulevard where it turned right and proceeded north along Echo Park Avenue to terminate at Cerro Gordo Street in the Echo Park neighborhood.

== History ==
The route was opened as a horsecar line in 1889 under the Elysian Park Street Railway Company. When Moses Sherman and Eli P. Clark projected their line to Santa Monica, the builders of the horsecar line donated them the road with the provision that the new builders should electrify the Echo Park section as well as maintain the line. After a delay of several years, electric service began on November 15, 1902. The line was relaid with standard gauge rails in 1909.

Pacific Electric designated the service with the number 32. At the time of the Great Merger of 1911, the line operated only as a shuttle on Echo Park Avenue between Sunset and Cerrito Gordo. Early the following year, the cars were continuing downtown to be through-routed with the Venice Boulevard Line. The inbound terminus was truncated to 9th and Hill in 1916. Between July and September 1926, the terminal was extended to 11th and Hill. Power issues in 1924 forced the route to again operate as a shuttle service on Echo Park between July and November. Through-routing to Venice continued starting in 1932 and persisted until 1950. Evening and Sunday service was converted to bus operations starting in 1939, but was reestablished in 1942 as a wartime measure. Service was reduced to a single franchise car on October 1, 1950, with full abandonment following on December 28.

== See also ==
- Streetcars in Los Angeles
- Streetcar suburb
- List of California railroads
- History of rail transportation in California
