= Westgate Line =

Pacific Electric streetcar line (1906–1940)

Westgate
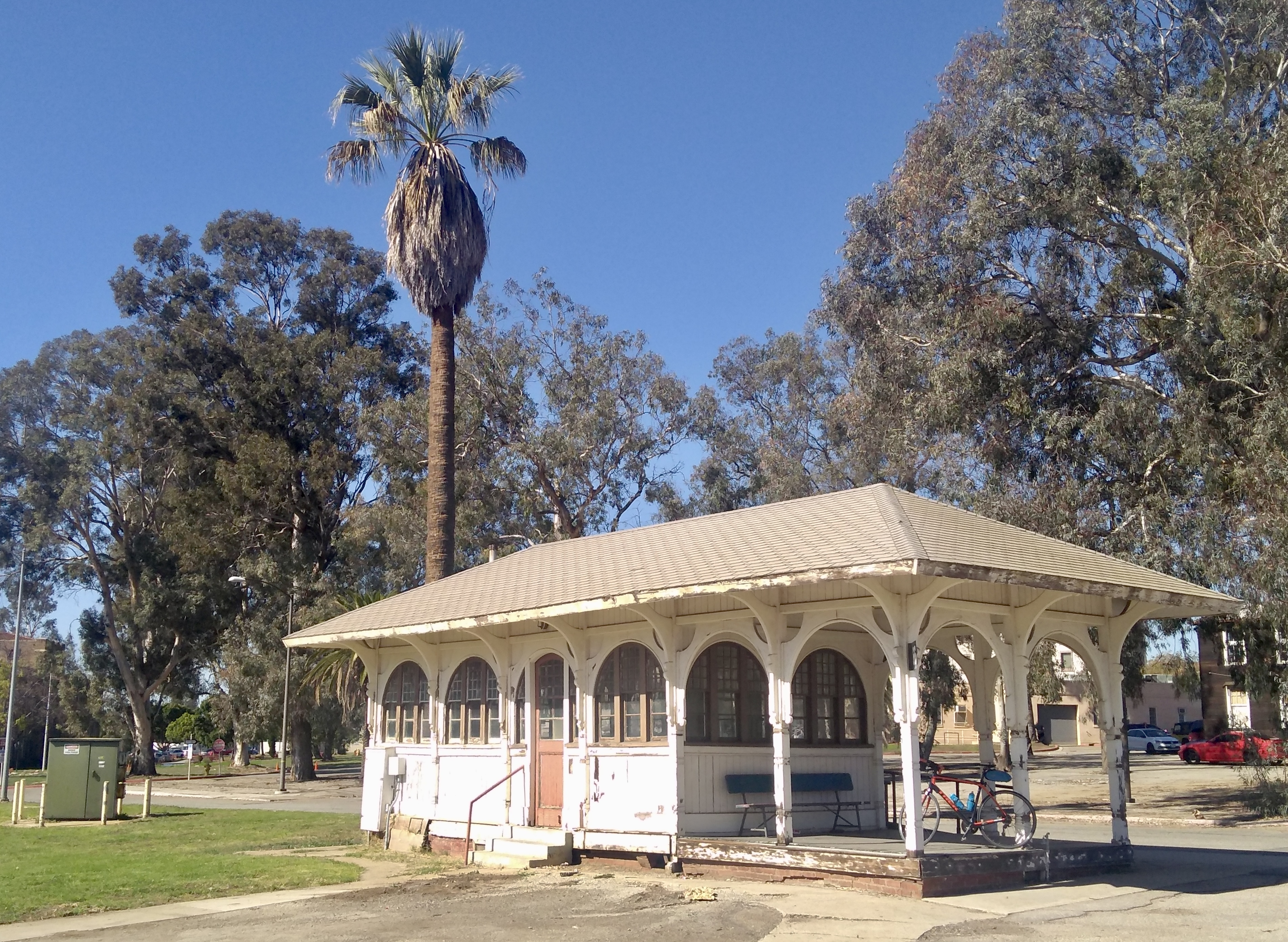

Overview
- Owner: Southern Pacific Railroad
- Locale: Los Angeles
- Termini: Pacific Electric Building; Santa Monica, California
- Stations: 18

Service
- Type: Interurban
- System: Pacific Electric
- Operator(s): Pacific Electric
- Ridership: 263,017 (1926)

History
- Opened: 1906
- Closed: November 18, 1940

Technical
- Track gauge: 1,435 mm (4 ft 8 1/2 in) standard gauge
- Old gauge: narrow gauge
- Electrification: Overhead line, 600 V DC

The Westgate Line was a suburban route operated by the Pacific Electric Railway from 1911 to 1940. This line was one of four lines connecting Downtown Los Angeles and Santa Monica that did not run through Hollywood. The line is notable for taking a circuitous route towards its end, along San Vicente Boulevard, mainly because it was built to encourage construction of new homes near Pacific Palisades.

Many riders were veterans and employees of the Soldiers' Home, Sawtelle, stopping at the Streetcar Depot, West Los Angeles.

== History ==
The electrified line was built and operated by the Los Angeles Pacific Railroad, opened in 1906 with narrow gauge rails. On March 19, 1906, an agreement was reached to sell all the Los Angeles Pacific Railroad lines to Henry Huntington’s Pacific Electric Railway for $6 million (equivalent to $210 million in 2024). The line was converted to standard gauge in early 1908.

Service was reduced to a single franchise car by July 1, 1940, with full abandonment following on November 18.

== Route ==
The Westgate Line followed the Sawtelle Line as far as Sawtelle. From Sawtelle (Santa Monica Boulevard between Purdue and Butler Avenues) the Westgate Line branched northwesterly into an unimproved private way. Dual tracks ran in the center of the private way, across Ohio Avenue, and then along the westerly edge of the U.S. Government Soldier's Home property to a location near Rochester and Butler Avenues.

Here the dual rails entered the grounds of the Soldier's Home and continued north-westerly on private way, across Wilshire Boulevard to enter another section of unimproved private way in the center of San Vicente Boulevard.

The dual tracks followed San Vicente Boulevard, between twin roadways, in a sweeping curve to the west, crossing out of the Soldier's Home property at Bringham Avenue. Continuing in the center of San Vicente Boulevard, the rails ran west crossing Barrington and Montana Avenues, and Bundy Drive to reach the Santa Monica city limit at 26th Street. Once into Santa Monica the dual tracks, still on private way between twin roadways, ran approximately 2 miles (3.2 km) southwesterly, across the various numbered streets of Santa Monica, to Ocean Avenue. The dual tracks then ran southeasterly in the pavement of Ocean Avenue, crossing the major intersections of Montana Avenue, Wilshire Boulevard and Santa Monica Boulevard to reach the terminus of the line, one block farther south at Broadway.

== Traffic ==
Passengers (Fare and Transfer)
Year	Passengers	Car miles	Revenue
1913	394,283	246,195	$30,541
1916	337,709	201,669	19,984
1918	319,991	202,110	20,130
1920	340,953	178,608	22,424
1922	305,325	178,120	23,390
1924	350,688	183,000	27,133
1926	263,017	193,756	31,410

== See also ==
- Streetcar suburb
- Streetcars in North America
- List of California railroads
- History of rail transportation in California
