= Pacific Electric Sub-Station No. 14 =

- U.S. National Register of Historic Places
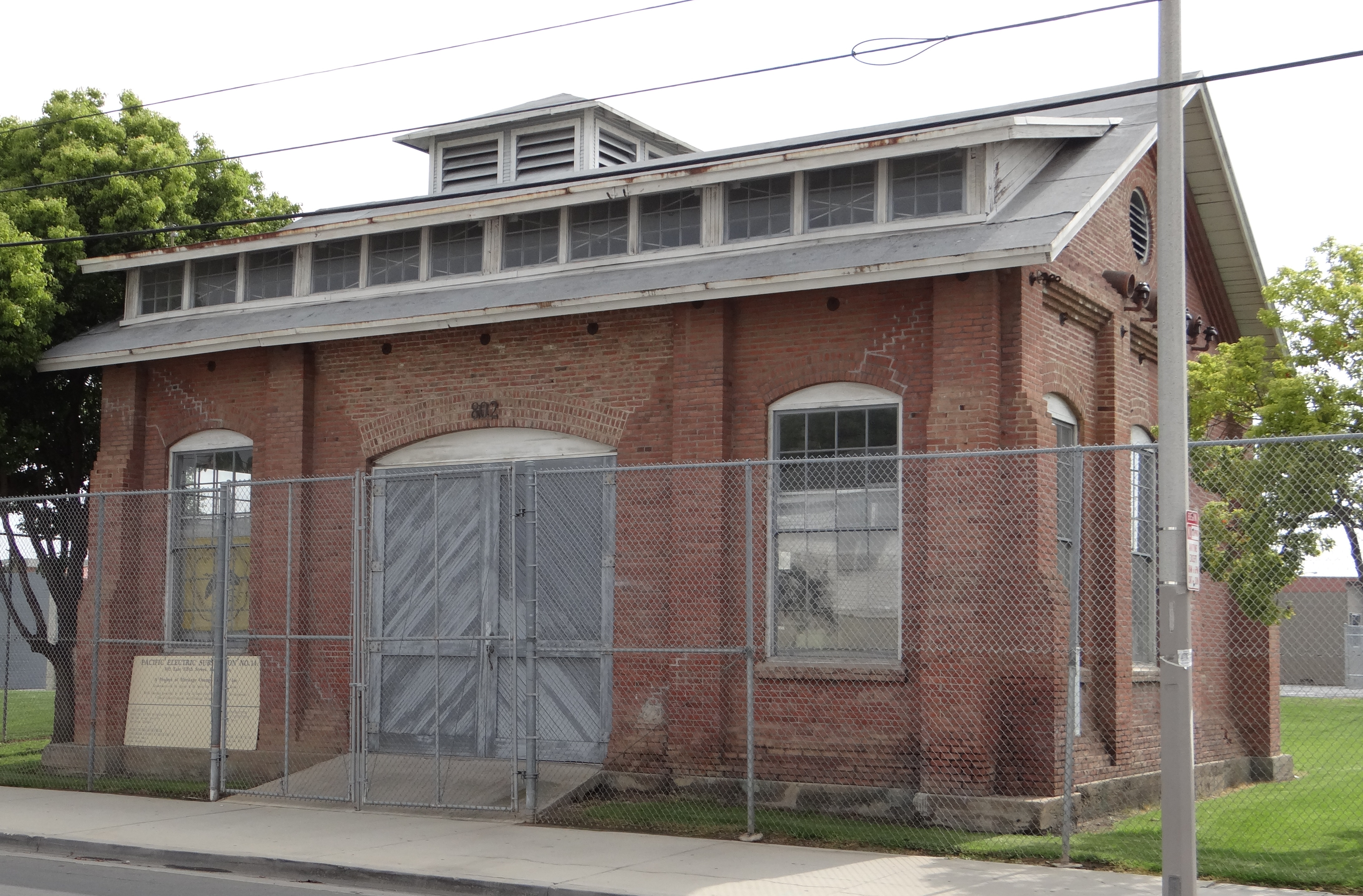
- Pacific Electric Substation No. 14

- Location within California Location within the United States
- Location: 802 E. 5th St. Santa Ana, California
- Coordinates: 33°44′55″N 117°51′37″W
- Area: 0.1 acres (0.040 ha)
- Built: 1907
- Built by: Pacific Electric Railway Construction Dept.
- NRHP reference No.: 83001219
- Added to NRHP: September 22, 1983

The Pacific Electric Sub-Station No. 14 is a former traction substation in Santa Ana, California. It was built by the Pacific Electric Railway to provide electricity to run the railway's streetcars in central Orange County, California. The building was added to the National Register of Historic Places in 1983.

== Substation function ==
Electric trolley and interurban cars required 600 volts direct current (DC) to operate a car's DC traction motors. The function of a "substation" was to convert very high voltage alternating current (AC) from a power station, often miles away, for the necessary conversion to a lower voltage DC. High voltage AC entered the substation, was dropped to a lower voltage by a transformer, and then fed to a device called a Rotary Converter for the conversion to 600 volts DC. Substations were required on every trolley and interurban line in the United States and often still are for today's subway and light rail lines. Later the very large and cumbersome rotary converters, as much as eight feet (2.4 m) in diameter rotating and vibrating and requiring a human round-the-clock operator, were replaced by small package solid state converters with no operator.

== History ==
Pacific Electric Railway's Santa Ana substation #14 was built in 1907 and still stands. It is a single-story, rectangular building made of brick with minimal classical ornamentation in its design. There are hollow pipes at each end for electric wires to enter and exit. Very high voltage alternating current (AC) from the Watts Steam Generating Station (30 miles [48 km] away) entered at one end of the building and was converted (by rectification by a six foot high massive rotating machine called a rotary converter) to 600 volts direct current (DC) necessary to power the interurban trains, and the DC wires then exited the building at the opposite end. A transformer was located inside the building to drop the high voltage (delivered from Watts) to a lower voltage AC for the rotary converter. This substation powered the Watts–Santa Ana Line, the Santa Ana–Orange Line, and the Santa Ana–Huntington Beach Line and was in service from 1907 until the cessation of passenger service in 1950. It is the last former Pacific Electric substation building remaining in Orange County.

Substation #14 was listed in the National Register of Historic Places in 1983 due to its association with the Pacific Electric Railways extensive operation in Orange County as well as for its architecture. The building was partially restored in 2020, replacing the roof and converting interior spaces.

== See also ==
- Pacific Electric Railway Company Substation No. 8
- Ivy Substation
- National Register of Historic Places listings in Orange County, California
