= Waterfront Red Car =

California heritage railway (2003–2015)

Port of LA Waterfront Red Car
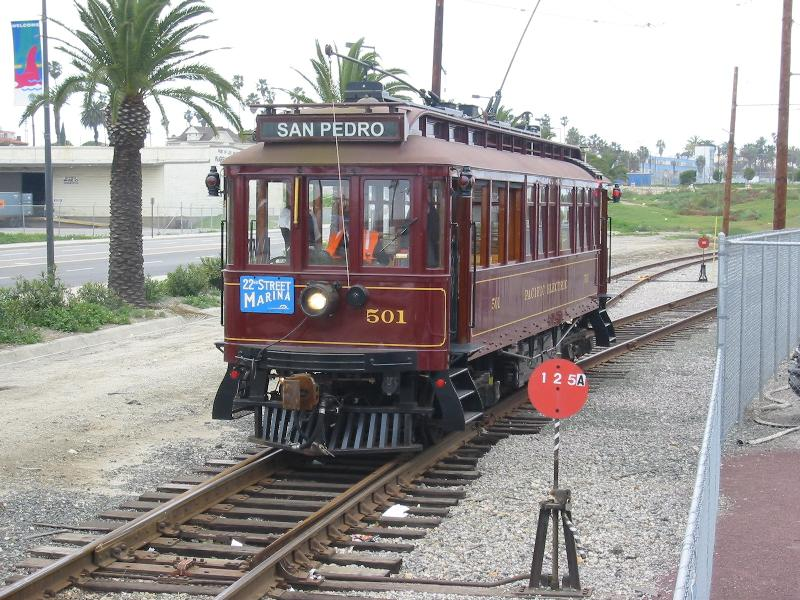
- Pacific Electric Replica 501 in San Pedro
- Locale: San Pedro, Los Angeles
- Terminus: Between World Cruise Center and 22nd Street at Miner Street

Commercial operations
- Built by: Pacific Electric Railway
- Original gauge: 4 ft 8 1/2 in (1,435 mm) standard gauge
- Original electrification: 600 V DC overhead line

Preserved operations
- Owned by: Port of Los Angeles
- Operated by: Port of Los Angeles
- Stations: 4
- Length: 1.5 mi (2.4 km)
- Preserved gauge: 4 ft 8 1/2 in (1,435 mm) standard gauge
- Preserved electrification: 600 V DC overhead line

Preservation history
- July 19, 2003: Opened
- September 27, 2015: Closed

The Port of Los Angeles Waterfront Red Car Line was a 1.5-mile (2.4 km) heritage streetcar line for public transit along the waterfront in San Pedro, at the Port of Los Angeles in Los Angeles, California. The line operated between July 2003 and September 2015, when service was discontinued due to major construction projects that resulted in the demolition of a portion of the route.

== Route ==
The route ran south over a former Pacific Electric Railway right-of-way from the World Cruise Centre cruise ship terminal under the Vincent Thomas Bridge to the intersection of 22nd Street and Miner Street, with intermediate stops at Downtown San Pedro, the Maritime Museum, and the Ports O' Call Village. The service operated three days a week (Friday to Sunday) with occasional service on other weekdays depending on passenger ship landings.

== History ==
The Pacific Electric Railway Red Car system operated for over 60 years (the final line closed in 1961), with more than 990 miles (1,600 km) of tramway routes throughout Greater Los Angeles and the surrounding cities and counties.

The heritage streetcar line opened for service on July 19, 2003, with a construction cost of $10 million ($17.5 million in 2025 adjusted for inflation).

The Waterfront Red Cars were supplemented by two shuttle bus lines. The Blue line serves downtown San Pedro and Ports O' Call village, whereas the Green line serves the harbor and marina.

=== Shutdown ===
Future extensions to Cabrillo Beach, Harbour Park, the new cruise ship terminal at Berth 46, Pacific Avenue, and Warehouse 1 were initially under consideration. In April 2010, a new feasibility report was released, with the first priority to switch much of the existing line to street-running tramway track on Sampson Way.

In 2015 it was announced the Waterfront Red Car Line would be closed for 18 months, with service ceasing in late September 2015, to make way for the realignment of Sampson Way leading into Ports O’ Call Village. Because the street realignment cuts through the southern part of the line, it would require a new track and modified, street-level cars running parallel to the new Sampson Way, estimated to cost $40 million. Port officials eventually concluded that such reconstruction would be cost prohibitive. Waterfront Red Car Line service ended on September 27, 2015. Development plans for San Pedro's Ports O' Call previously announced in March 2016 included the resumption of Waterfront Red Car service; no date for the restoration of the Red Cars was included in the announcement. By 2021, tracks south of 6th Street had been removed and the Harbor Department had no plans to reinstate service.

== Rolling stock ==
The Waterfront Red Cars comprised three tram cars in the style of the originals. Two of the three Red Cars — the replica cars, numbers 500 and 501 — were built from scratch by employees of the port of Los Angeles; the interiors were cooled using the same clerestory-style windows as the original 500-class Red Cars (“The Fives”).

The third car, No. #1058, was a vintage Pacific Electric 950-class car, having been assembled from two wrecked 950-class cars by Richard J. Fellows. It was restored for parades, movies, and the like, and then cleverly converted to be steered with the original throttle as a tiller and braked by the original brake handle; the original dead man pedal operated the gasoline engine throttle, which powered the rubber tires. The Port of Los Angeles bought the car and converted it back for rail operation as a charter service.

The replica cars were planned to be reused again when the line reopened, but they would have been modified to run on light rail tracks. In October 2026, a plan was approved to loan all three trolley cars to different museums.

== See also ==
- List of heritage railroads in California
- Heritage streetcar systems
- Public transportation in Los Angeles County, California
