= Ivy Substation =

Theatre in Culver City, California, United States

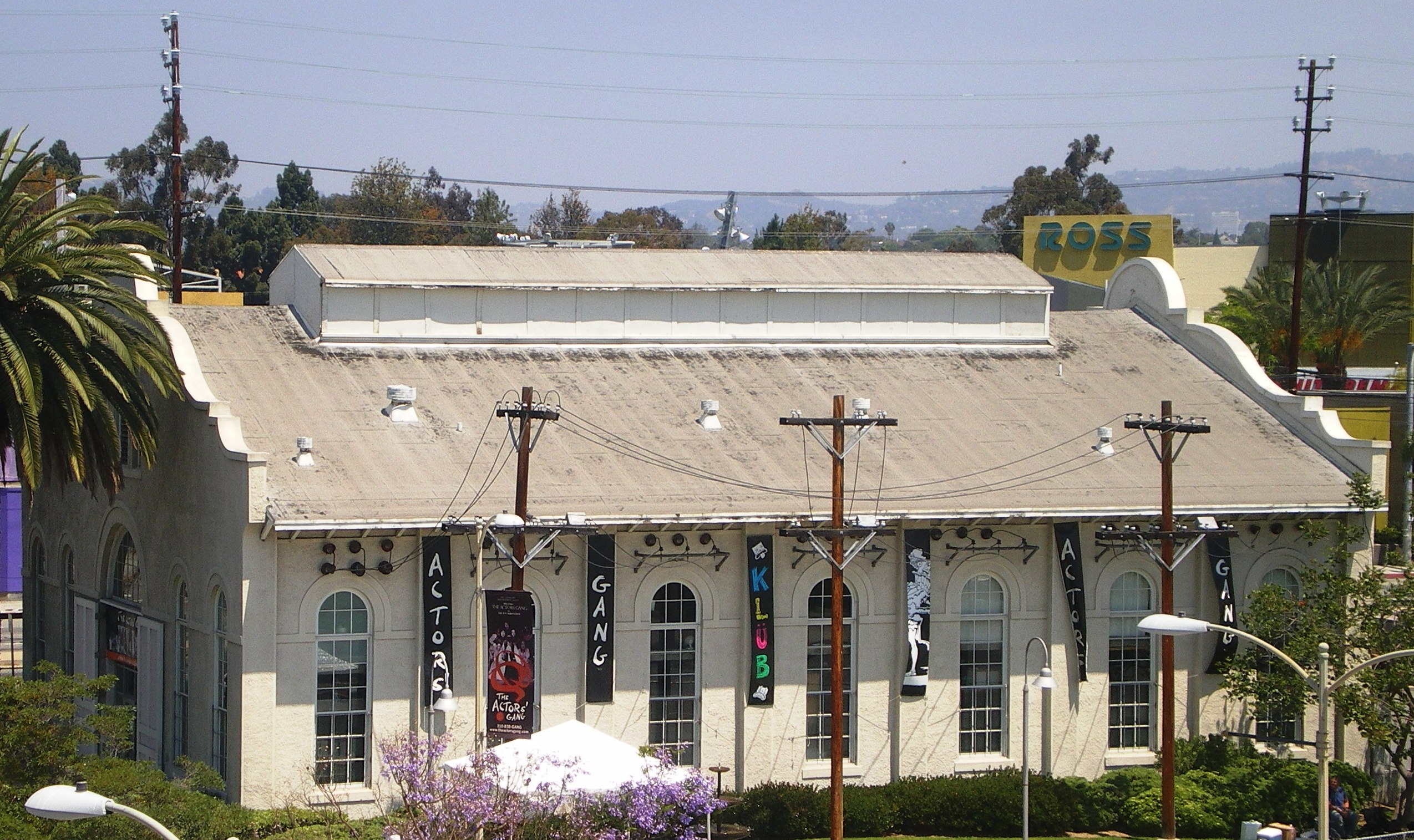
- Interactive map of Ivy Substation
- Address: 9070 Venice Boulevard; Los Angeles, California
- Owner: City of Los Angeles
- Operator: City of Culver City
- Capacity: 99

Construction
- Opened: 1992

Tenant
- The Actors' Gang

Website
- www.theactorsgang.com
- Los Angeles Pacific Company Ivy Park Substation
- U.S. National Register of Historic Places
- Los Angeles Historic-Cultural Monument
- Coordinates: 34°1′35″N 118°23′35″W
- Area: 1.1 acres (0.45 ha)
- Built: 1907
- Architectural style: Mission/Spanish Revival
- NRHP reference No.: 81000155
- LAHCM No.: 182

Significant dates
- Added to NRHP: March 25, 1981
- Designated LAHCM: February 1, 1978

Ivy Substation (also known as the Ivy Park Substation or Culver Substation) is a 99-seat theatre in Palms, Los Angeles, adjacent to the city of Culver City, California. The building was formerly a traction power substation for nearby interurban rail lines, and was converted to a theatre in the 1990s. The building was designated as a Los Angeles Historic-Cultural Monument in 1978, and was listed on the National Register of Historic Places in 1981.

The former substation is owned by the city of Los Angeles and managed by Culver City. Since 2005, it has been the home of experimental theatre company The Actors' Gang.

== History ==
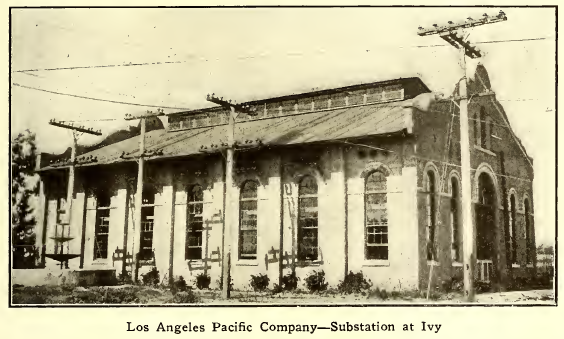
Ivy Substation, photographed in 1909

The Ivy Substation is a single-story, rectangular-shaped building in the Mission Revival style. It was built in 1907 as a traction substation by the Los Angeles Pacific Railway (LAP), which subsequently became part of the Pacific Electric (PE) railway in 1911. The substation was constructed near the intersection of three streetcar and interurban lines: the Venice Short Line, the Redondo Beach via Playa del Rey Line, and the Santa Monica Air Line. The Ivy Substation opened during an era of expansion for the LAP and later the PE, and replaced a smaller substation building.

During its service with the PE, the Ivy Substation contained two 1300-kilowatt rotary converters. The substation converted high-voltage alternating current to 600 volts direct current for use by trains, which drew power from overhead lines above the tracks.

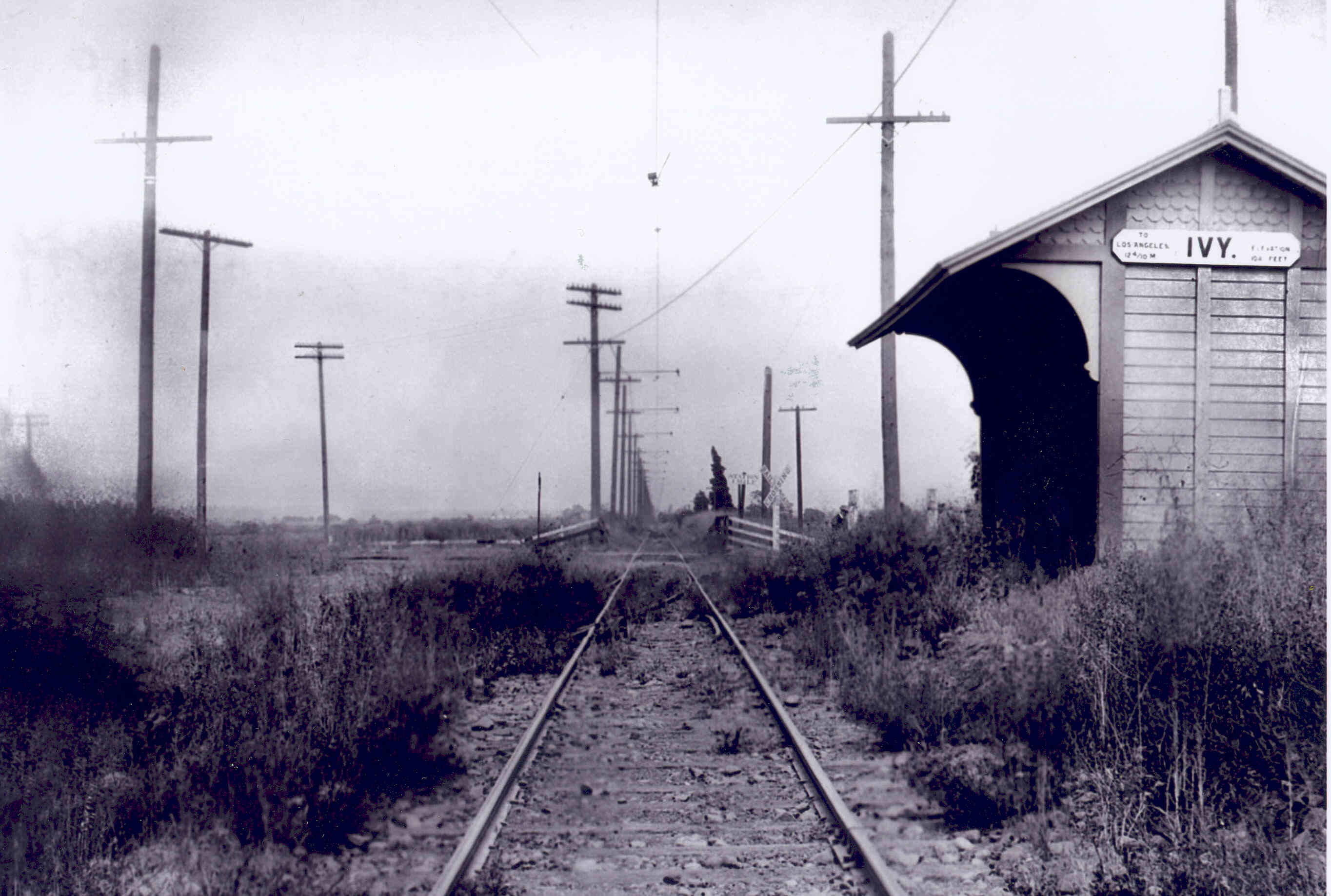
Power from the substation served Ivy station (now Culver City station) and surrounding tracks until 1953

The three rail lines that drew power from the substation were converted to buses in the 1940s and 1950s. Passenger services on the Santa Monica Air Line, the final line adjacent to the substation, ended in 1953. The few remaining freight trains over the Santa Monica Air Line were hauled by diesel locomotives.

After the end of interurban service, the electrical equipment was removed. The building was purchased by the city of Los Angeles in 1977, using funds from gas tax revenue. It was designated as a Los Angeles Historic-Cultural Monument in 1978, and was listed on the National Register of Historic Places in 1981.

The substation and the adjacent public park are located on the Los Angeles–Culver City boundary, near Culver City's central business district. In the 1960s, Culver City made multiple proposals to either annex the property into its jurisdiction or purchase it, but none of those efforts were successful. By the 1980s, Culver City leaders were advocating for the city of Los Angeles to improve the property, which includes the adjacent Media Park.

The Culver City Redevelopment Agency reached an agreement to lease the property from the city of Los Angeles in 1986. Renovations to convert the former substation building to a theatre and community arts center began in 1991, and the building was rededicated in the spring of 1993. The renovations installed an elevator for compliance with the Americans with Disabilities Act, and also included asbestos abatement and seismic retrofitting.

In 2000, the theatre hosted the first United States revival of Arthur Miller's first play, The Man Who Had All the Luck. The play was Miller's Broadway debut, but closed after four performances with negative reviews. The U.S. revival was produced and directed by Dan Fields for the Antaeus Theatre Company, and ran from April to May 2000.

The Ivy Substation was leased by the Westside wing of Center Theatre Group from 2002 to 2004, which moved to the nearby Kirk Douglas Theatre. The Ivy Substation has been occupied since 2005 by experimental theatre company The Actors' Gang. 14 theatre companies applied to lease the theatre in 2005, with the winner receiving 8 months of use per year.

== See also ==
- Culver City station, formerly Ivy station.
- Pacific Electric Railway Company Substation No. 8
- Pacific Electric Sub-Station No. 14
- List of Pacific Electric Railway lines
