= Pacific Electric Railway Company Substation No. 8 =

- U.S. National Register of Historic Places
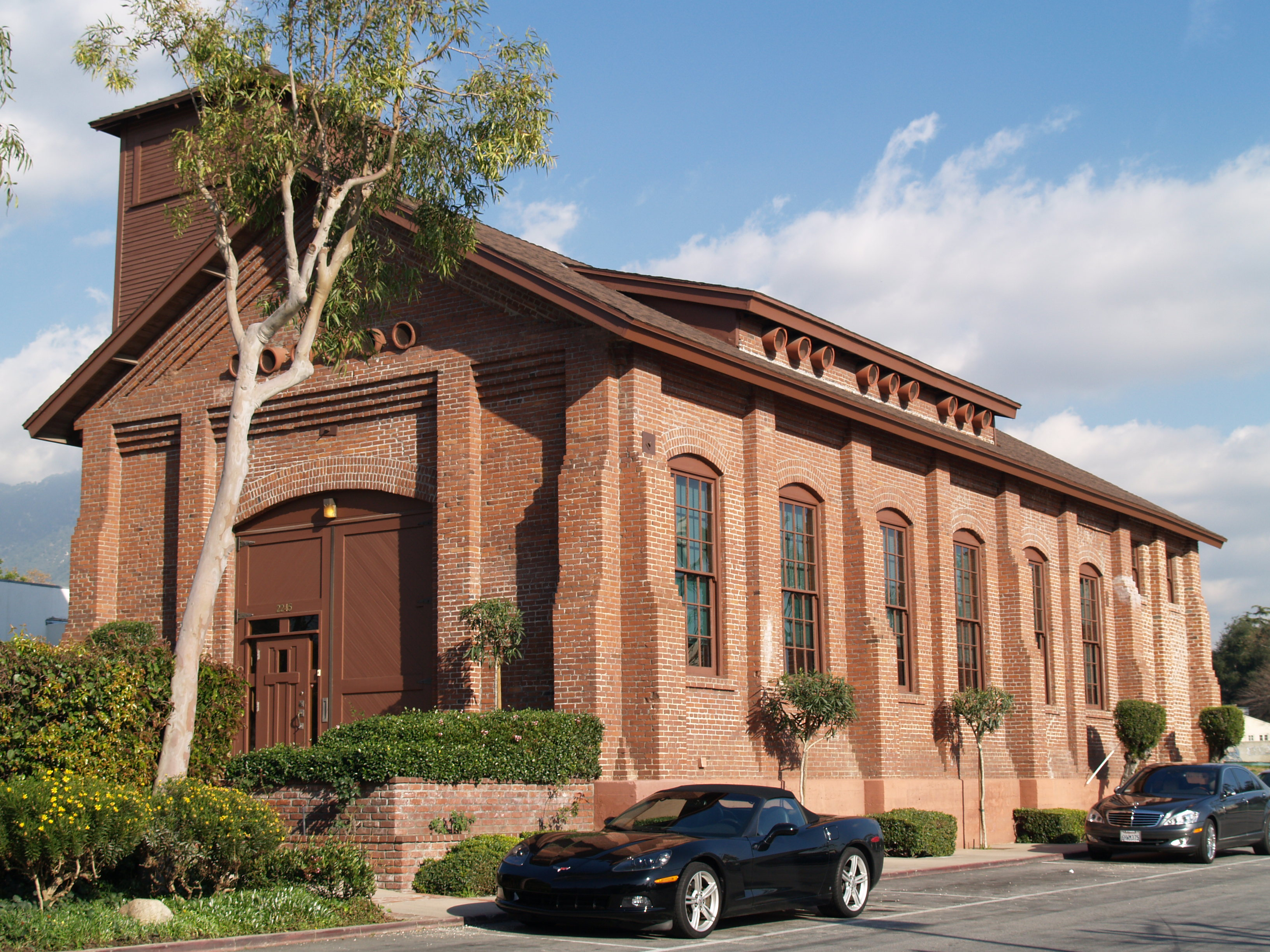
- Pacific Electric Railway Company Substation No. 8

- Location within the Los Angeles metropolitan area Location within California Location within the United States
- Location: 2245 N. Lake Ave; Altadena, California
- Coordinates: 34°11′04″N 118°07′55″W
- Architect: Pacific Electric Railway
- NRHP reference No.: 77000295
- Added to NRHP: November 9, 1977

Pacific Electric Railway Company Substation No. 8, also known as the Altadena Substation, is a former traction substation in Altadena, California. It operated under the Pacific Electric Railway and served as the substation for Pasadena area lines.

== History ==
The Pacific Electric traction substation was built in 1905. In addition to providing power to the PE lines, it also powered the Mount Lowe Railway. In 1941, when PE sold its Pasadena area lines to Pasadena City Lines, a subsidiary of National City Lines, the substation was included in the sale.

The Substation was placed on the National Register of Historic Places in 1977 for its significance as a part of the Pacific Electric Railway. By 1999 it was being used as an office building. In 2016, the Pacific Southwest Mennonite Conference opened a thrift store in the building.

== Substation ==
Electric interurban and trolley cars required 600 volts direct current to operate a car's Direct Current (DC) traction motors. The function of a "substation" was to convert very high voltage alternating current (AC) from a power generating plant (often miles away) for an AC to lower voltage DC conversion. The high voltage AC entered the substation, was dropped in level by a transformer, and the resulting lower voltage AC was then fed to a device called a rotary converter for the conversion to 600 volts DC. Substations existed on every trolley and interurban line in the United States and often still do for today's subway and light rail lines, although the very large and cumbersome rotary converter, as much as 8 feet (2.4 m) in diameter and rotating, has been replaced by solid state converters.

== See also ==
- Pacific Electric Sub-Station No. 14
- Ivy Substation
