= Pacific Electric =

Transit company in Southern California

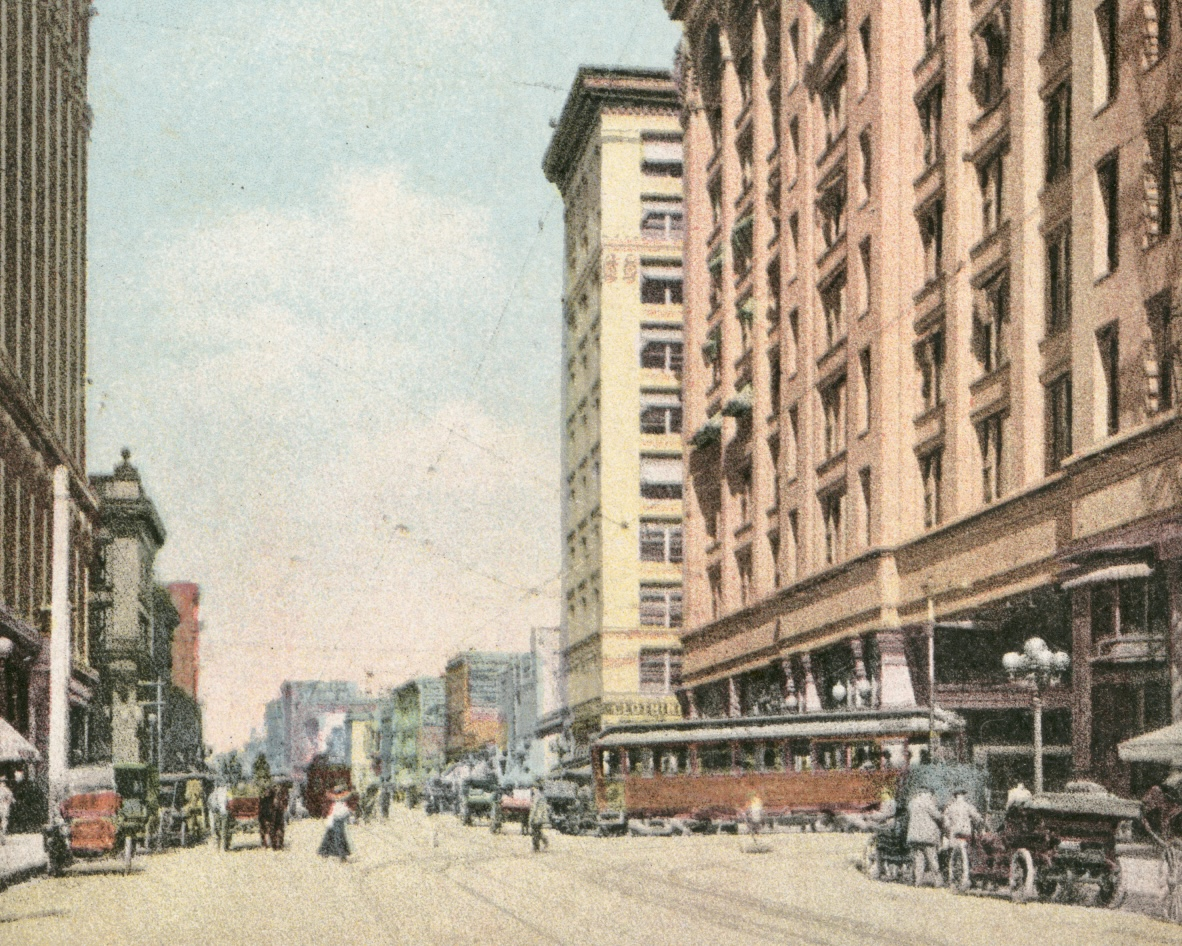
- Pacific Electric Building and Main Street

Overview
- Headquarters: Los Angeles, California
- Reporting mark: PE
- Locale: Greater Los Angeles Area
- Dates of operation: 1901; 125 years ago– 1961; 65 years ago (passenger) – 1965; 61 years ago (freight)
- Successor: Southern Pacific (freight); Los Angeles Metropolitan Transit Authority, Los Angeles Metro Rail (passenger)

Technical
- Track gauge: 4 ft 8 1/2 in (1,435 mm) standard gauge
- Electrification: Overhead line, 600 V DC, 1,200 V DC (San Bernardino Line only)

The Pacific Electric Railway Company, nicknamed the Red Cars, was a privately owned mass transit system in Southern California consisting of electrically powered streetcars, interurban railway cars, and buses. It was the largest electric railway system in the world in the 1920s. Organized around the city centers of Los Angeles and San Bernardino, it connected cities in Los Angeles County, Orange County, San Bernardino County and Riverside County.

The system shared dual gauge track with the 3 ft 6 in (1,067 mm) narrow-gauge Los Angeles Railway's "Yellow Cars" on Main Street in downtown Los Angeles (directly in front of the 6th and Main terminal), on 4th Street, and along Hawthorne Boulevard south of downtown Los Angeles towards Hawthorne, Gardena, and Torrance.

== Districts ==
Los Angeles Pacific Electric (Red Cars) network

The system had four districts:

- Northern District: San Gabriel Valley, including Pasadena, Mount Lowe, South Pasadena, Alhambra, El Monte, Covina, Duarte, Glendora, Azusa, Sierra Madre, and Monrovia.
- Eastern District: Pomona, San Bernardino, Arrowhead Springs, Riverside, Rialto and Redlands in the Inland Empire. (Note: Usually included in the Northern District)
- Southern District: Long Beach, Newport Beach, Huntington Beach, San Pedro via Dominguez, Santa Ana, El Segundo, Redondo Beach via Gardena, and San Pedro Via Torrance.
- Western District: Hollywood, Glendale/Burbank, San Fernando Valley, Beverly Hills, Santa Monica, Manhattan/Redondo/Hermosa Beaches, Venice, Playa Del Rey.

== History ==
=== Origins ===
Electric streetcars first appeared in Los Angeles in 1887. In 1895 the Pasadena & Pacific Railway was created from a merger of the Pasadena and Los Angeles Railway and the Los Angeles Pacific Railway (to Santa Monica). The Pasadena & Pacific Railway boosted Southern California tourism, living up to its motto "from the mountains to the sea."

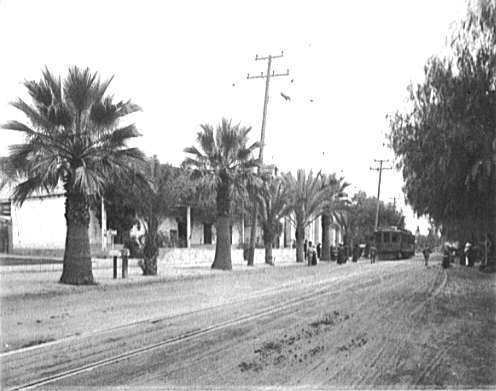
Old Mission Trolley streetcar of the Pacific Electric makes a stop at Mission San Gabriel Arcángel, 1905.

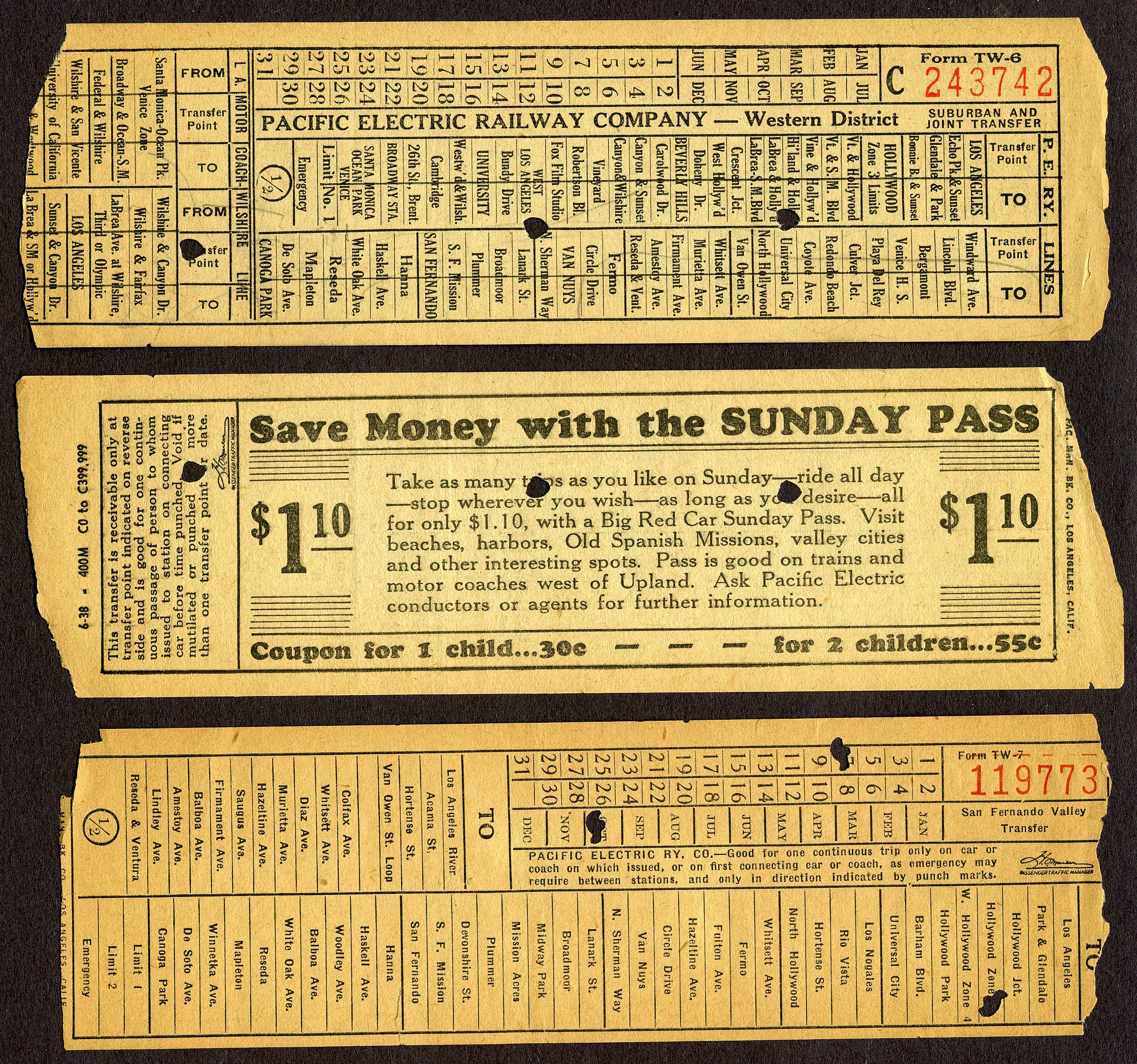
Three PE tickets. The top two (front and back views) between downtown LA and Santa Monica, the bottom for a transfer from Hollywood to the San Fernando Valley.

The Pacific Electric Railway was created in 1901 by railroad executive Henry E. Huntington and banker Isaias W. Hellman. As a Vice President of the Southern Pacific Railroad (SP), operated by his uncle Collis Potter Huntington, Henry E. Huntington had a background in electric streetcar lines in San Francisco, where he oversaw SP's effort to consolidate many smaller street railroads into one organized network. Hellman, the President of the Nevada Bank, San Francisco's largest, became one of the largest bond holders for these lines and he and the younger Huntington developed a close business relationship. The success of their San Francisco trolley adventure and Hellman's experience in financing some early Los Angeles trolley lines led them to invest in the purchase of some existing downtown Los Angeles lines which they began to standardize and organize into one network called the Los Angeles Railway. When his uncle Collis died, Henry lost a boardroom battle for control of the Southern Pacific to Union Pacific President E. H. Harriman. Huntington then decided to focus his energies on Southern California.

In May 1901, Hellman, who had been Southern California's leading banker for almost three decades, wrote Huntington that "the time is at hand when we should commence building suburban railroads out of the city." Hellman added that he had already tasked engineer Epes Randolph to survey and lay out the company's first line which would be to Long Beach. In that same year, Huntington and Hellman incorporated a new entity, the Pacific Electric Railway of California, formed to construct new electric rail lines to connect Los Angeles with surrounding cities. Hellman and his group of investors owned the controlling majority of stock (double that of Huntington's) and the newspapers of the time referred to it as the Huntington-Hellman syndicate. Using surrogates, the syndicate began purchasing property and rights-of-way. The company's first main project, the Long Beach Line, opened on July 4, 1902.

Huntington experienced periods of opposition from organized labor with the construction of the new railways. Tensions between union leaders and like-minded Los Angeles businessmen were high from the early 1900s up through the 1920s. Strikes and boycotts troubled the Pacific Electric throughout those years, simmering with the onset of World War I, reaching a height of violence in the Los Angeles streetcar strike of 1919.

Railroads were one part of the enterprise. Revenue from passenger traffic rarely generated a profit, unlike freight. The real money for the investors was in supplying electric power to new communities and in developing and selling real estate. To get the railways and electricity to their towns, local groups offered the Huntington interest opportunities in local land. Soon Huntington and his partners had significant holdings in the land companies developing Naples, Bay City (Seal Beach), Huntington Beach, Newport Beach and Redondo Beach.

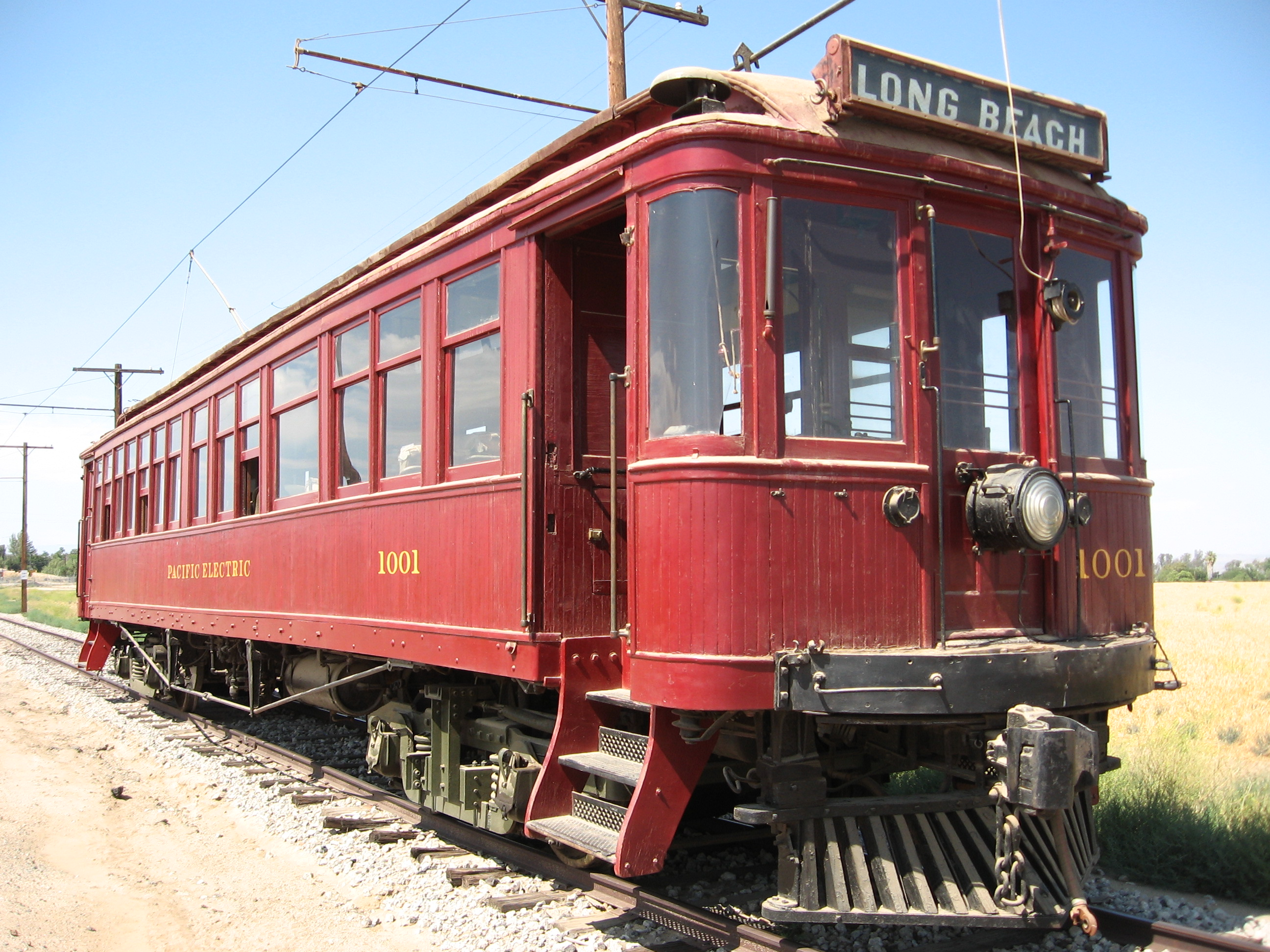
Pacific Electric #1001 at the Southern California Railway Museum in Perris, California.

Harriman, who controlled the powerful Southern Pacific Railroad, was concerned with the competition that these new electric lines gave his steam railroad traffic, and had been prodding Huntington for joint ownership of the lines but Huntington refused to negotiate. In early 1903, Harriman proposed a franchise plan with three-cent fare plan to the Los Angeles City Council, a plan which, if accepted, would have handicapped the other railways severely. Huntington countered with a ticket book which gave the rider 500 miles (800 km) of travel for $6.25 (Note: equivalent to $224 in 2025), which undercut the Harriman strategy. The Council vetoed the franchise idea, unable to believe adequate service could be provided for such a low fare. Then, on April 14, 1903, Harriman bought Hook's Los Angeles Traction Company, which ran lines within the downtown area and, through its California Pacific subsidiary, was constructing a line from Los Angeles to San Pedro.

The final confrontation came over a bidding war for the 6th Street franchise, in which the franchise (thought to be worth maybe $10,000), finally went to the top bidder for $110,000, (Note: equivalent to $3.94 million in 2025) with Harriman the secret winner. In May 1903, Huntington made an overnight trip to San Francisco and worked out an arrangement with Harriman. The Pacific Electric would get the Los Angeles Traction Lines, SP's San Gabriel Valley Rapid Transit Railway line, the 6th Street franchise, and some downtown trackage. In return, Harriman got 40.3% of PE stock, an amount equal to Huntington's, with Hellman, Borel and De Guigne owning the remaining 20%. Huntington could expand the PE as he saw fit, but he was not to compete with existing SP lines. A byproduct of this sale was that Harriman sold the banking unit of his Wells Fargo Company to Hellman who merged it with his Nevada Bank operations and established the Pacific Coast's largest, most powerful bank.

=== Construction ===
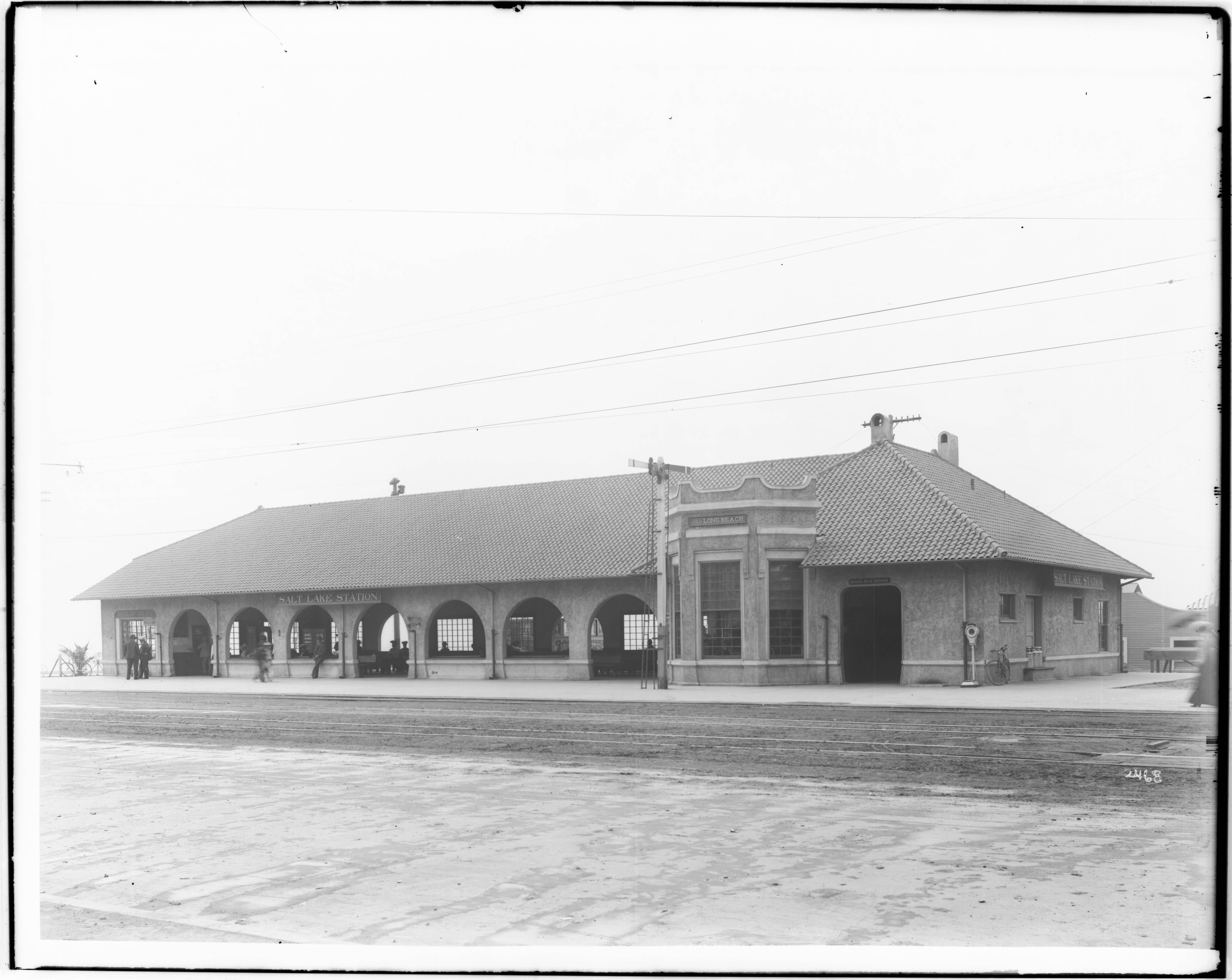
Pacific Electric & Salt Lake Railroad station in Long Beach, 1905

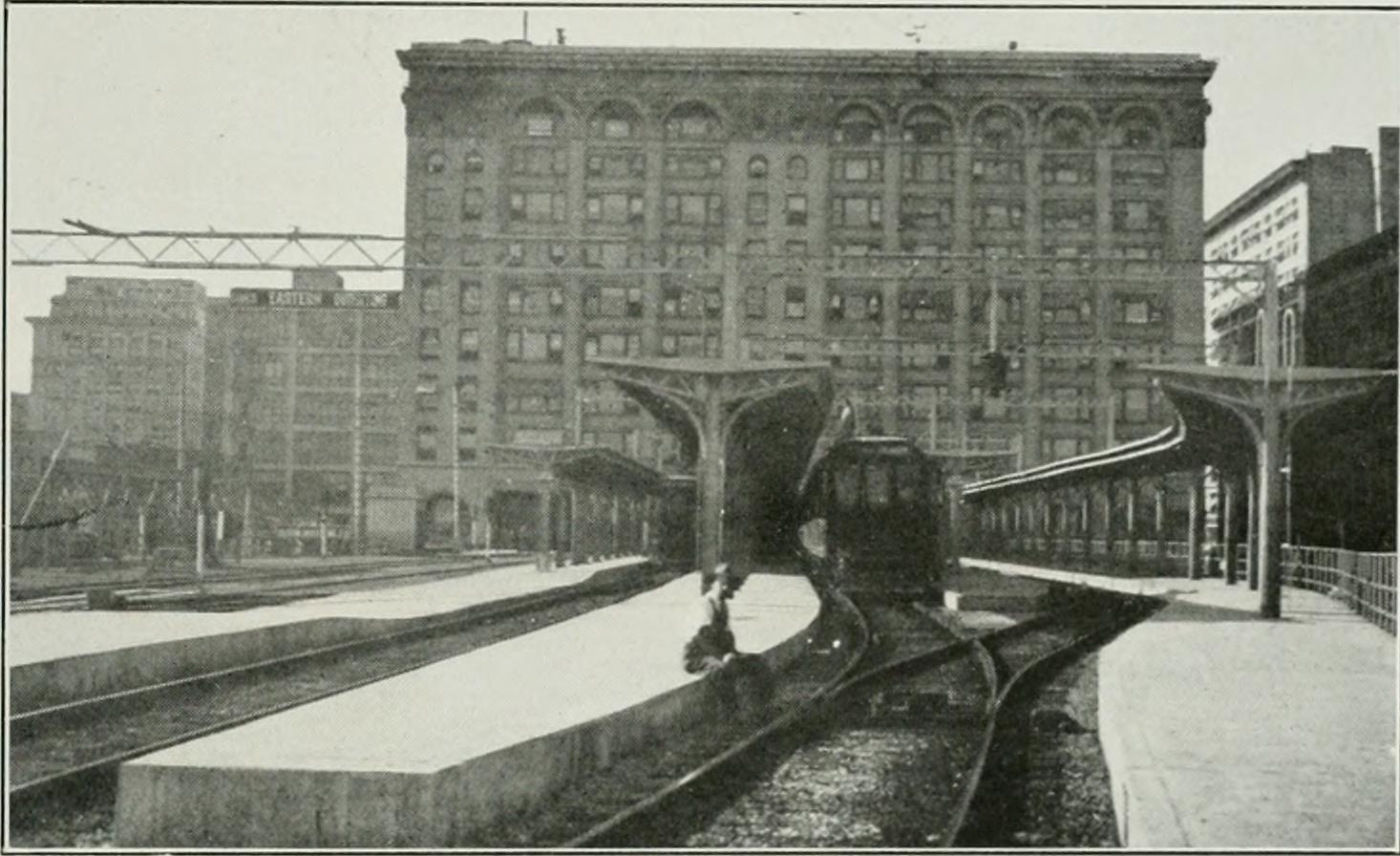
Pacific Electric Building, Located at Sixth and Main Streets was the Pacific Electric's principal station. The view shows platforms and umbrella sheds east of Los Angeles Street, the tracks at this point being elevated some 16 feet (4.9 m) above the level of the street. This improvement was made in 1916.

On June 6, 1903, Huntington created the Los Angeles Inter-Urban Railway, capitalized at $10 million, (Note: equivalent to $358 million in 2025) with plans to extend lines to Santa Ana, Newport Beach, the San Fernando Valley, La Habra, Redlands and Riverside, with branches to Colton and San Bernardino. He simultaneously created the Los Angeles Land Company. Huntington owned almost all the stock in the companies, with token amounts allotted to company directors. Although the company allowed Huntington to proceed with construction plans unencumbered by outside interference, the poor state of the bond market meant that he had to turn to stockholders to finance expansion. In 1904 he acquired and finished the Los Angeles and Glendale Railway. In June, LAIU assumed control of the Riverside and Arlington Railway and the Santa Ana and Orange Motor Railway, and soon after, PE and LAIU finished their extension to Huntington Beach and began building a line to Covina.

Huntington continued to expand and not declare profits. On December 7, 1904, the Hellman group sold the rest of their shares and bonds in PE and LAIU to Huntington and Harriman for $1.2 million. (Note: equivalent to $43 million in 2025) Huntington and Harriman were now equal partners in ownership of the Pacific Electric. The Hellman syndicate retained their 45% interest in the Los Angeles Railway, which they thought would eventually declare dividends.

By 1905, the Newport and Santa Ana lines were completed. In 1906, the Newport line was extended to Balboa, and in late 1906, lines to Sierra Madre and Oak Knoll in Pasadena were finished. The two firms controlled 449 miles (723 km) of track, with the Pacific Electric at 197 miles (317 km) and the LAIU, 252 miles (406 km). Huntington purchased the Los Angeles and Redondo Railway in July 1905, along with the Redondo Land Company, which owned 90% of the land in the beach community. This announcement precipitated a land boom in the area which resulted in a quick return of Huntington's entire investment in the area and in the railway.

On March 19, 1906, an agreement was reached to sell control of the Los Angeles Pacific Railroad lines, owned by Moses Sherman and Eli P. Clark, for a reported $6 million (Note: equivalent to $215 million in 2025) to Harriman; this turned over all the lines in downtown Los Angeles to Santa Monica and down the coast to Redondo Beach to the Southern Pacific. In January 1907, the Hellman syndicate, after seeing that Huntington ran the Los Angeles Railway similarly to PE, continually expanding and not declaring dividends, sold their 45% stake in the Los Angeles Railway to Harriman and the Southern Pacific.

The Covina line was completed in 1907, as well as a line from Monrovia to Glendora. The system reached La Habra in 1908. By 1910 PE operated nearly 900 miles (1,400 km) of track. Routes had been built into or passed through areas just beginning to grow.

1905 was the Pacific Electric's most profitable year, when the road made $90,711. (Note: equivalent to $3.25 million in 2025) Profits from the Huntington Land and Improvement Company made up for the poor earnings of the interurban system, with profits of $151,000 in 1905 rising to $402,000 in 1907. (Note: equivalent to $5.41 million and $13.9 million in 2025) However, in 1909, earnings were only $75,000. (Note: equivalent to $2.69 million in 2025)

Huntington had begun long negotiations with Harriman about consolidating the Los Angeles electric railways beginning in 1907. There had always been a difference between the two men as to the purpose of the railway, with Huntington seeing the PE as a means to facilitate his real estate efforts, and Harriman seeing it as part of the Southern Pacific's overall transportation system in Southern California. Harriman left Huntington alone until 1910, when the former refused to allow the latter to run a line to San Diego that would have interfered with a competitive arrangement Harriman had worked out with the Santa Fe Railway.

In July 1908, Huntington leased all the lines of the Los Angeles Inter-Urban Railway to Harriman. In 1909 he sold the systems in Fresno and Santa Clara County to the Southern Pacific. Talks paused after the death of Harriman on September 9, 1909, but resumed in early 1910. On September 27, 1910, Huntington and Southern Pacific management came to a final agreement. In a complicated stock and bond transaction, Huntington conveyed his 50% of Pacific Electric to the Southern Pacific, while he acquired SP's 45% interest in the Los Angeles Railway. In addition, Huntington conveyed the Los Angeles and Redondo Railway to the Southern Pacific. Huntington retained control of the Los Angeles Railway, the narrow-gauge street car system known locally as the "Yellow Cars," until a controlling interest in this company was sold off by Huntington's estate in 1944.

=== The Great Merger and the "New" Pacific Electric ===
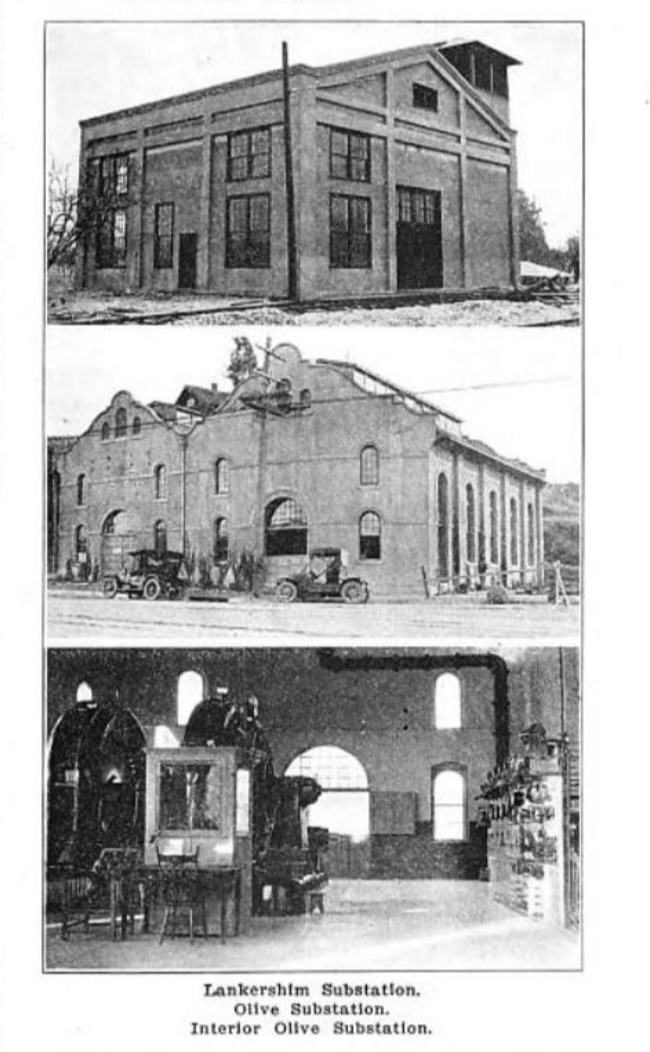
Pacific Electric Railway substations Lankershim and Olive (1912)

In what was called the "Great Merger" of September 1, 1911, the Southern Pacific created a new Pacific Electric Railway Company, with all electrical operations now under the Pacific Electric name. The constituent railroads were:

- Original "old" PE owned by Huntington
- Los Angeles Inter-Urban Railway
- Los Angeles Pacific Railway
- Los Angeles and Redondo Railway
- San Bernardino Valley Traction Company
- San Bernardino Interurban Railway
- Redlands Central Railway Company
- Riverside and Arlington Railway Company

Following these acquisitions, PE was the largest operator of interurban electric railway passenger service in the world, with 2,160 daily trains over 1,000 miles (1,600 km) of track. It operated to many destinations in Southern California, particularly to the south and east.

The Southern Pacific now began to emphasize freight operations. From 1911, when revenue from freight was $519,226, (Note: $17.9 million adjusted for inflation) freight revenue climbed to $1,203,956 in 1915, (Note: equivalent to $38.3 million in 2025) 13% of total revenue.

During the 1920s profits were good and the lines were extended to the Pasadena area, to the beaches at Santa Monica, Del Rey, Manhattan/Redondo/Hermosa Beach and Long Beach in Los Angeles County, and to Newport Beach and Huntington Beach in Orange County. Extra service beyond the normal schedules was provided on weekends, particularly in the late afternoon when passengers wanted to return simultaneously. Comedian Harold Lloyd highlighted the popularity and utility of the system in an extended sequence in his 1924 film Girl Shy, where, after finding one Red Car too crowded, he commandeered another and drove at high speed through the streets of Culver City and Los Angeles.

In response to a proposal to establish the first bus company in Los Angeles by William Gibbs McAdoo, Pacific Electric and the Los Angeles Railway proposed their own system, the Los Angeles Motor Bus Company. A public referendum chose the latter in May 1923. The first service began in August 1923, and by 1925 had 53 miles of bus routes, the second-most in the nation after Chicago.

PE operated frequent freight trains under electric power throughout its service area (as far as 65 miles [105 km]) to Redlands, including operating electrically powered Railway Post Office routes, one of the few U.S. interurbans to do so. This provided important revenue. The PE was responsible for an innovation in grade crossing safety: the automatic electromechanical grade crossing signal, nicknamed the wigwag. This device was quickly adopted by other railroads. A few wigwags continue in operation as of 2006.

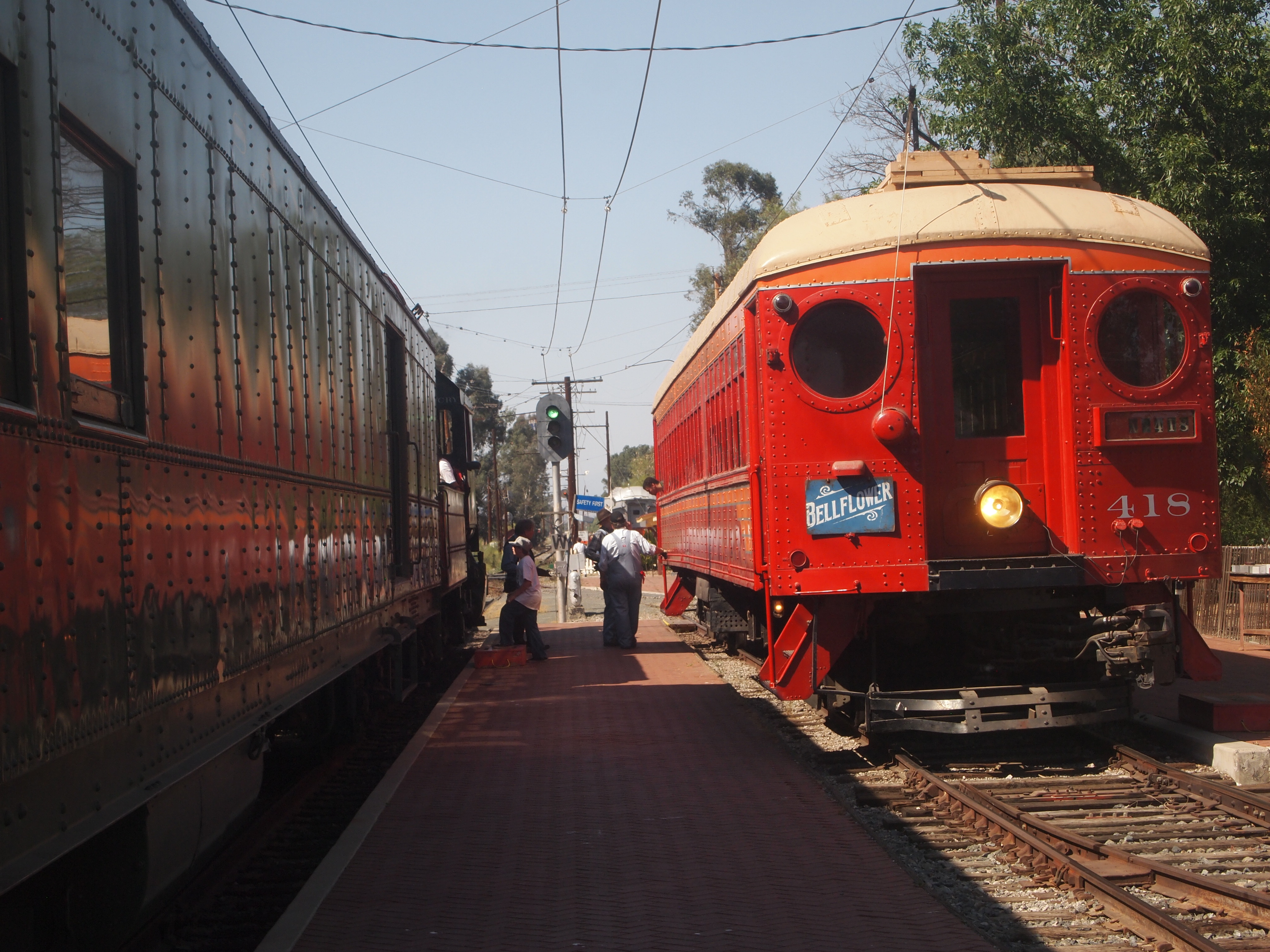
Pacific Electric #418 at the Southern California Railway Museum. Many of the museum's streetcars are serviceable and operated for the public.

During this period, the Los Angeles Railway provided local streetcar service in central Los Angeles and to nearby communities. These trolleys were known as the "Yellow Cars" and carried more passengers than the PE's "Red Cars" since they ran in the most densely populated portions of Los Angeles, including south to Hawthorne and along Pico Boulevard to near West Los Angeles to terminate at the huge Sears Roebuck store and distribution center (the L.A. Railway's most popular line, the "P" line). The Yellow Cars' unusual narrow-gauge PCC streetcars, by now painted MTA two-tone green, continued to operate until the end of rail service in 1963.

Large profits from land development were generated along the routes of the new lines. Huntington Beach was incorporated in 1909 and developed by the Huntington Beach Company, a real-estate development firm owned by Henry Huntington, which still owns both land in the city and most of the mineral rights.

There are other local streetcar suburbs. Angelino Heights was built around the Temple Street horsecar, which was later upgraded to electric streetcar as part of the Yellow Car system. Highland Park was developed along the Figueroa Street trolley lines and railroads linking downtown Los Angeles and Pasadena. Huntington owned nearly all the stock in the Pacific Electric Land Company. West Hollywood was established by Moses Sherman and his partners of the Los Angeles and Pacific Railway. Moses Sherman, Harry Chandler, Hobart Johnstone Whitley, and others bought the entire southern San Fernando Valley in 1910. The electric railway and a $500,000 boulevard called Sherman Way connected the three townsites they were selling. These included Van Nuys, Marion (now Reseda), and Owensmouth (now Canoga Park). Parts of Sherman Way are now called Chandler Boulevard and Van Nuys Boulevard.

The railway company "connected all the dots on the map and was a leading player itself in developing all the real estate that lay in between the dots".

=== Decline ===
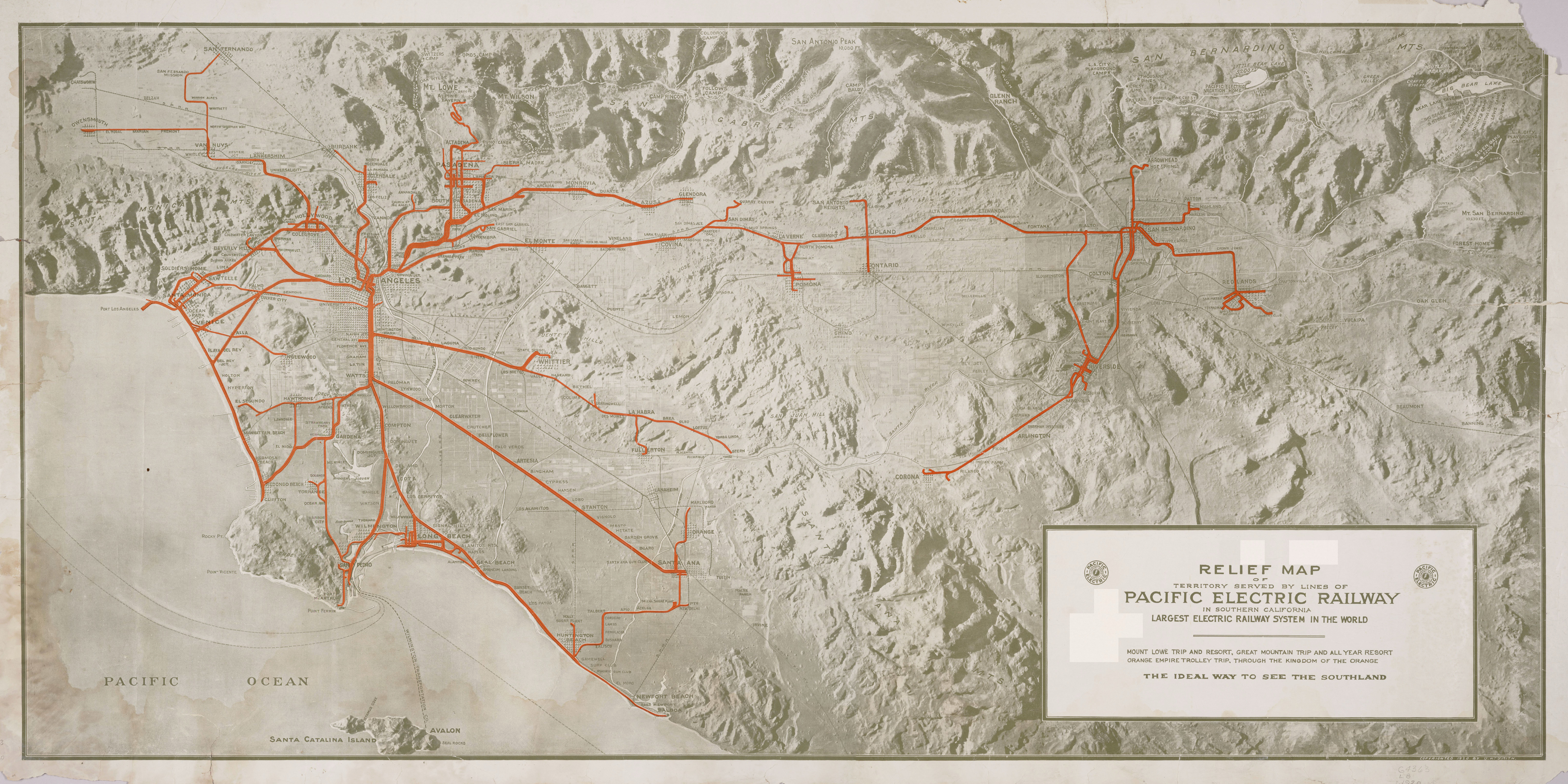
Map of Pacific Electric rail routes, 1920.

Huntington's involvement with urban rail was intimately tied to his real estate development operations. Real estate development was so lucrative for Huntington and SP that they could use the Red Car as a loss leader. However, by 1920, when most of the company's holdings had been developed, their major income source began to deplete. Many rural passenger lines were unprofitable, with losses offset by revenue generated from passenger lines in populated corridors and from freight operations. The least-used Red Car lines were converted to cheaper bus routes as early as 1925. In 1936, Pacific Electric acquired the Motor Transit Company, which operated intercity bus service within Southern California.

In the pre-automobile era, electric interurban rail was the most economical way to connect outlying suburban and exurban parcels to central cities.

Although the railway owned extensive private roadbeds, usually between urban areas, much PE trackage in urban areas such as downtown Los Angeles west of the Los Angeles River was in streets shared with automobiles and trucks. Virtually all street crossings were at-grade, and increasing automobile traffic led to decreasing Red Car speeds on much of its trackage. At its nadir, the busy Santa Monica Boulevard line, which connected Los Angeles to Hollywood and on to Beverly Hills and Santa Monica, had an average speed of 13 miles per hour (21 km/h).

Traffic congestion was of such great concern by the late 1930s that the influential Automobile Club of Southern California engineered an elaborate plan to create an elevated freeway-type Motorway System, a key aspect of which was the dismantling of the streetcar lines, replacing them with buses that could run on both local streets and on the new express roads.

When the freeway system was planned in the 1930s the city planners planned to include interurban tracks in the center margin of each freeway but the plan was never implemented. There was one exception that was within the Hollywood Freeway through Cahuenga Pass. The San Fernando Valley line from Hollywood took to the center of the Freeway over the pass and exited at Lankershim Boulevard. When that service was terminated, the freeway was expanded onto the former PE roadbed.

The Whittier & Fullerton line was cut in 1938, Redondo Beach, Newport Beach, Sawtelle via San Vicente, and Riverside in 1940. When the San Bernardino Freeway opened in 1941 but was not yet connected to the Hollywood Freeway, while the "Four Way" overpass was being constructed, westbound car traffic from the SB freeway poured onto downtown streets near the present Union Station. PE's multiple car trains coming and going from Pasadena, Sierra Madre, and Monrovia/Glendora used those same streets the final few miles from private right-of-way to reach the 6th and Main PE terminal and were bogged down within this jammed traffic. Schedules could not be met, plus former patrons were now driving. The San Bernardino line, Pomona branch, Temple City branch via Alhambra's Main Street, San Bernardino's Mountain View local to 34th Street, Santa Monica Boulevard via Beverly Hills, and all remaining Pasadena local services were all cut in 1941. Permission was received in September 1942 to abandon the shuttle line to General Hospital which company officials said had been operating at a loss for several months.

The Glendale line survived to the early 1950s due to the convenience of a subway into downtown Los Angeles and used the company's only modern equipment, a group of streamlined PCC cars. In 1940, Pacific Electric sold its Glendale, Burbank, and Pasadena operations to Pacific City Lines. San Bernardino operations were sold to San Bernardino Valley Transit.

PE carried increased passenger loads during World War II, when Los Angeles County's population nearly doubled as war industries concentrated in the region attracting millions of workers. There were several years when the company's income statement showed a profit when gasoline and rubber were rationed and much of the populace depended on mass transit. At peak operation toward the end of the war, the PE dispatched over 10,000 trains daily and was a major employer in Southern California. However, the equipment in use was old and suffered from deferred maintenance.

The nation's last interurban railway post office (RPO) service was operated by PE on its San Bernardino Line. This was inaugurated comparatively late, on September 2, 1947. It left LA's new Union Station interurban yard on the west side of the terminal, turned north onto Alameda Street at 12:45 pm and reached San Bernardino at 4:40 pm, taking three hours for the trip while making postal stops en route as required. It did not operate on Sundays or holidays. This last RPO was pulled off May 6, 1950.

Aware that most new arrivals planned to stay in the region after the war, local municipal governments, Los Angeles County and the state agreed that a massive infrastructure improvement program was necessary. At that time politicians agreed to construct a web of freeways across the region. This was seen as a better solution than a new mass transit system or an upgrade of the PE.

=== Freeway construction ===
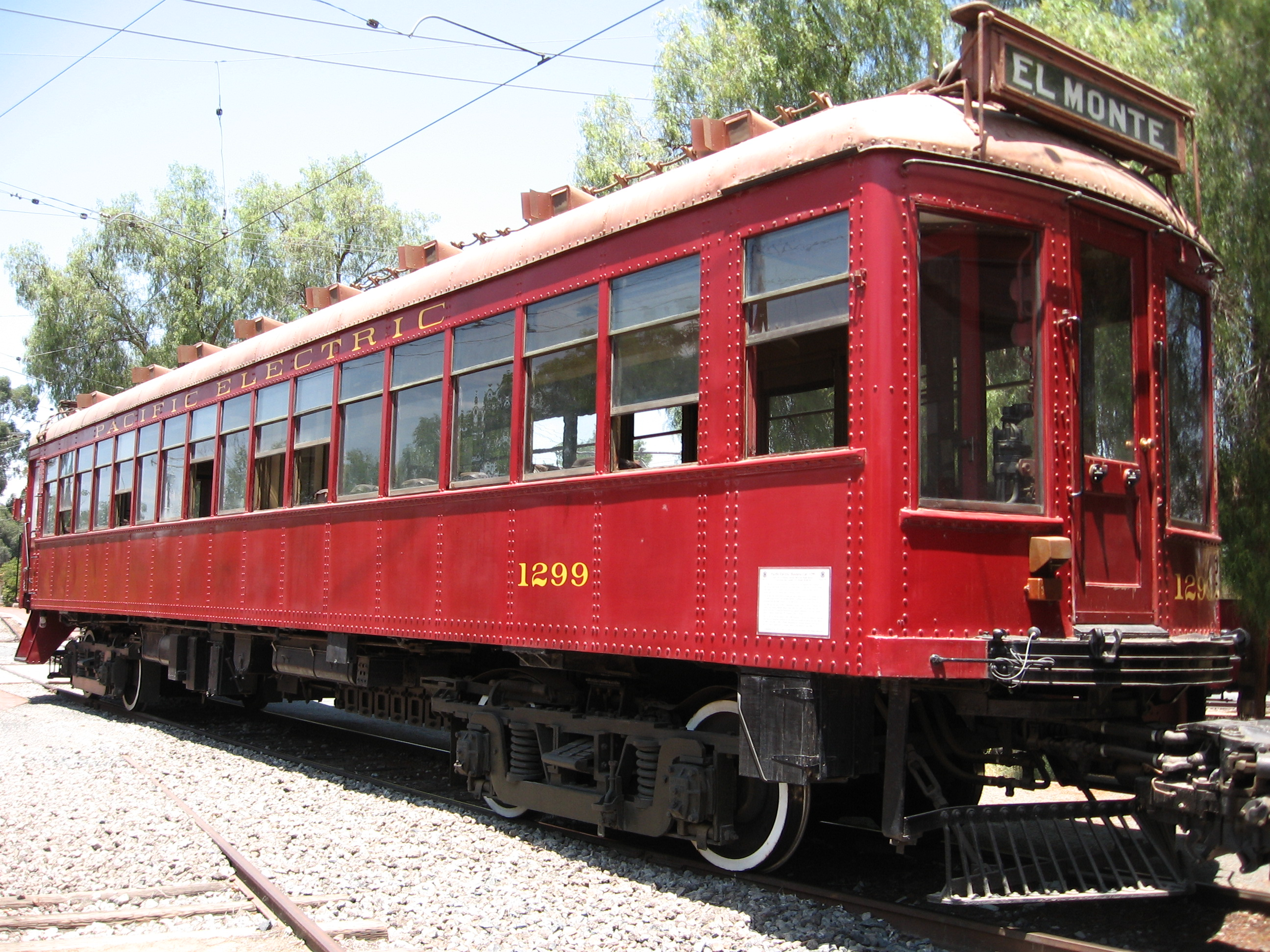
Pacific Electric #1299 Business Car.

Large-scale land acquisition for new freeway construction began in earnest in 1951. The original four freeways of the area, the Hollywood, Arroyo Seco (formerly Pasadena), Harbor, and San Bernardino, were in use or being completed. Partial completion of the San Bernardino Freeway to Aliso Street near downtown Los Angeles led to traffic chaos when inbound automobiles left the freeway and entered city streets.

The Southern District's passenger service to Santa Ana and Baldwin Park ended in 1950 as did the Northern District's Pasadena's Oak Knoll line, and the Sierra Madre line. The Western District's last line to Venice and Santa Monica also ended. The Pasadena and Monrovia/Glendora lines ended in 1951.

The various public agencies—city, county, and state—agreed with PE that further abandoning service was necessary and PE happily complied. PE management had earlier compared costs of refurbishing the Northern District interurban lines to Pasadena, Monrovia/Glendora, and Baldwin Park versus the alternative of converting to buses, and found in favor of the latter.

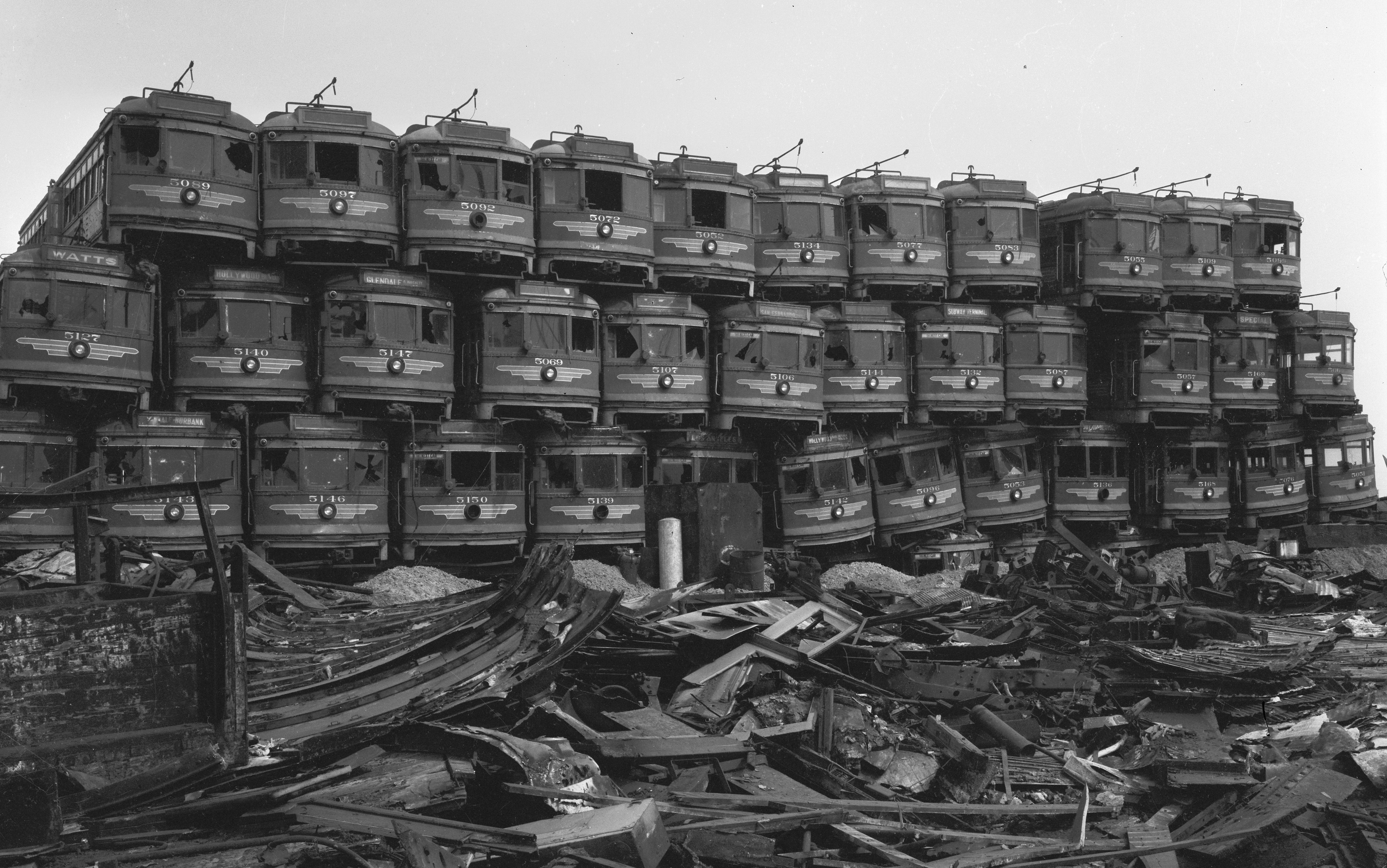
Pacific Electric cars are piled up awaiting destruction at Terminal Island, 1956

Remaining PE passenger service was sold off in 1953 to Metropolitan Coach Lines, which was given two years of rent-free usage of rail facilities. Jesse Haugh, of Metropolitan Coach Lines, was a former executive of Pacific City Lines which together with National City Lines acquired local streetcar systems across the country with the intention of shutting them down and converting them to bus operation in what became known as the Great American Streetcar Scandal.

Several lines operating to the north and the west which used the Belmont Tunnel from the Subway Terminal Building downtown ceased operation – the Hollywood Boulevard and Beverly Hills lines were shut down in 1954 and service to the San Fernando Valley, Burbank and Glendale using newly acquired PCC streetcars lasted only to 1955. The Bellflower line to the south closed in 1958 as the Golden State/Santa Ana (Interstate 5) neared completion.

=== Public ownership ===
The Los Angeles Metropolitan Transit Authority was established in 1951 to study the possibility of establishing a publicly owned monorail line running north from Long Beach to downtown Los Angeles and then west to Panorama City in the San Fernando Valley. In 1954, the agency's powers were expanded to allow it to propose a more extensive regional mass-transit system. In 1957, it was given the authority to operate transit lines.

In 1958, the California state government through its Public Utility Commission took over the remaining and most popular lines from Metropolitan Coach Lines. The MTA also purchased the remaining streetcar "Yellow Car" lines of the successor of the Los Angeles Railway, then called Los Angeles Transit Lines. LARy/LATL had been purchased from the Huntington estate by National City Lines in 1945. The MTA started operating all lines as a single system on March 3, 1958.

The Los Angeles-to-Long Beach passenger rail line served the longest, from July 4, 1902, until April 9, 1961. It was both the first and last interurban passenger line of the former Pacific Electric system. It was replaced by the Motor Coach 36f ("F" representing Freeway Flyer) route. The line, which used long stretches of open country running on private right-of-way, was later utilized when the Southern California RTD was designing and building the Metro Blue Line light rail line. The Blue Line, the first modern mass transit line in Los Angeles since the discontinuation of the Red Car service, was first opened in 1990.

The few remaining trolley-coach routes and narrow-gauge streetcar routes of the former Los Angeles Railway "Yellow Cars" were removed in early 1963. The public transportation system continued to be operated by the Los Angeles MTA until the agency was reorganized and relaunched as the Southern California Rapid Transit District in September 1964.

The Interstate Commerce Commission approved the merger of Pacific Electric into the Southern Pacific Railroad on August 12, 1965. Prior to the merger, PE's lucrative freight service had been by Southern Pacific diesel-electric locomotives on the heavy-duty PE rail-bed and rails and tripping the "wigwag" crossing signals.

A Christmas tree lot was operated in the small stub yard at the northwest corner of Willow Street and Long Beach Boulevard – the stock arrived in and was stored in a steel sided box car until the Christmas trees were prepared for sale – the busy intersection was where dual trackage departed Long Beach Boulevard and joined the private right-of-way from Huntington Beach and Seal Beach towards Los Angeles. The crossing signal there was the first installation of the final design of the Magnetic Watchman wigwag crossing signal and crossbucks. Oil tank cars were still shuttled to Signal Hill even as the surface street tracks were torn up from the center of Long Beach Boulevard long after the copper overhead catenary supply wires had been removed. Southern Pacific (now part of Union Pacific) continues to operate freight service utilizing former PE right-of-way.

== Post-closure ==
=== Successors ===
During the 1970s, there was serious discussion about the need for additional mass transit systems based on environmental concerns, increasing population and the 1973 oil crisis. A 1974 inquiry in the Senate heard allegations about the role that General Motors and other companies, including Pacific City Lines, played in the dismantlement of streetcar systems across the United States and in particular in Los Angeles, in what became known as the Great American Streetcar Scandal. The plot of the 1988 movie Who Framed Roger Rabbit is loosely modeled on the alleged conspiracy to dismantle the streetcar lines in Los Angeles.

In 1976, the California State Legislature formed the Los Angeles County Transportation Commission to coordinate the Southern California Rapid Transit District's (SCRTD, advertised and known locally by Angelenos as the RTD) efforts with those of various municipal transit systems in the area and to take over planning of countywide transportation systems. The SCRTD continued planning of the Metro subway (the Red Line), while the LACTC developed plans for the light rail system. Caltrans surveyed the condition of former Pacific Electric lines in 1982. Construction began in 1985. In 1988, the two agencies formed a third entity under which all rail construction would be consolidated, and in 1993, the SCRTD and the LACTC were merged into the Los Angeles County Metropolitan Transportation Authority (LACMTA).

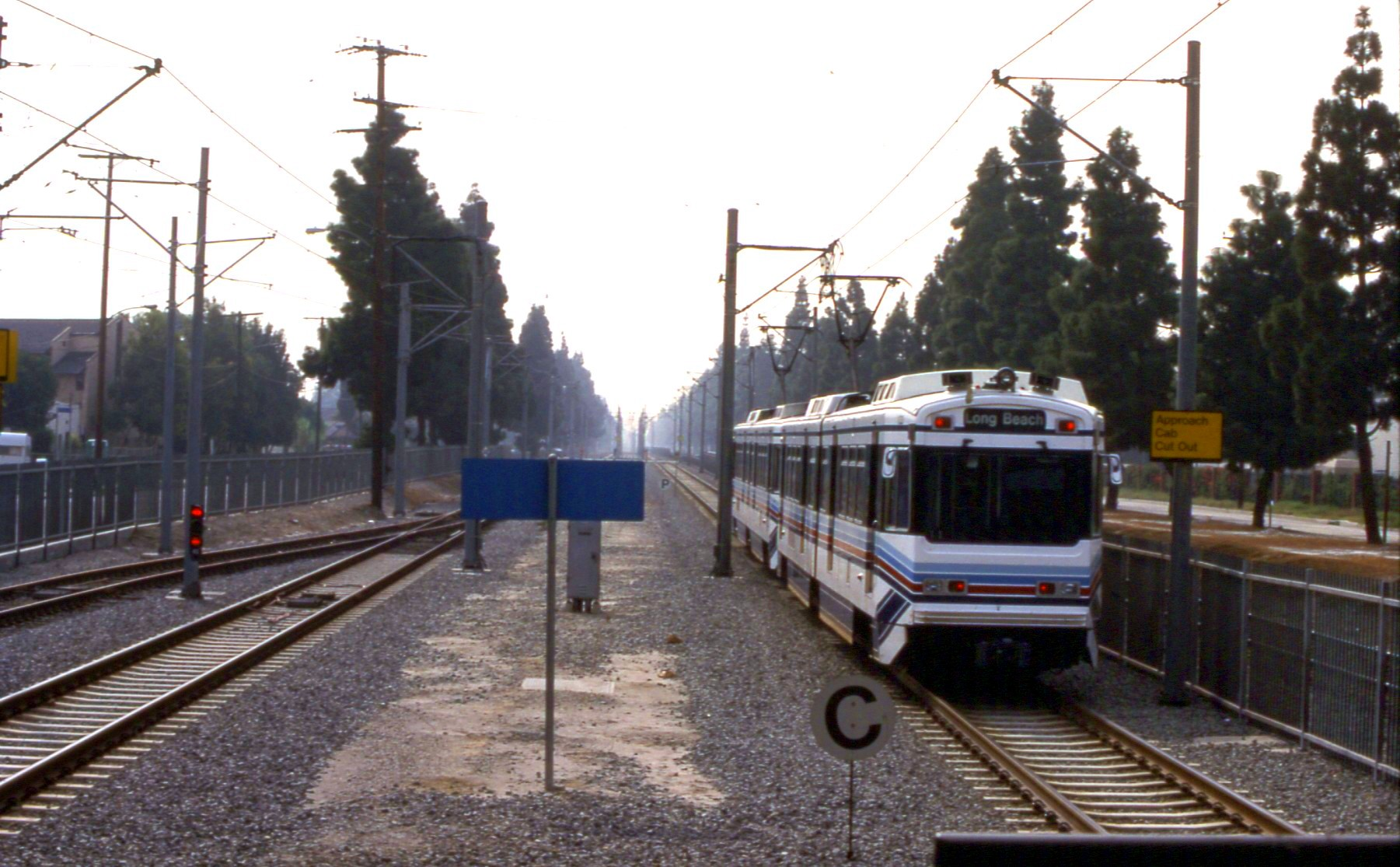
A Blue Line (now A Line) light rail train heads south out of Willowbrook/Rosa Parks station along the former right of way of the Long Beach Line, October 1995

When the Metro Blue Line commenced commuter service in 1990 from downtown Los Angeles to Long Beach, electric rail passenger train service returned to Los Angeles, using much of the PE roadbed that ceased in 1965. Since then, the LACMTA has opened additional lines.

The Metro Red Line subway opened next in three parts between 1993 and 2000, first from Union Station in central Los Angeles connecting with short subway which forms the northern terminus of Metro Blue Line at 7th/Figueroa Metro Center station, and then west under Wilshire Boulevard onward to Western Avenue. Construction was halted in 1985 due to an unrelated explosion of methane fumes in an underground portion of a Ross Dress for Less store along the proposed route turning north at Fairfax Avenue to Hollywood, which was to service the Los Angeles County Museum of Art, Museum Row and the La Brea Tar Pits. Afterwards, the United States Congress prohibited federal funding for subway construction underneath Wilshire Boulevard past Western Avenue at the request of then-Congressman Henry Waxman, which resulted in the subway being re-routed. The second portion was the result of this: the subway now traveled north under Vermont Avenue to Hollywood Boulevard turning west to Highland Avenue. When the Hollywood Freeway was built, two PE tracks remained in the center, entering the canyon to Cahuenga Pass under the freeway at what is now the northbound Highland Avenue onramp. PE trackage continued to provide mass transit efficiently until the line was abandoned; the former roadbed was eventually converted for highway use. RTD bus service replaced rail service and remained the highest daily passenger volume corridor. When the third expansion of the Red Line subway opened, most long-distance commuter bus routes from Downtown Los Angeles to the San Fernando Valley were trimmed to connect with the new subway stations, reducing diesel fumes and motor vehicle congestion. At the northernmost Metro Red Line terminus, North Hollywood, connections can be made to several MTA bus routes of the San Fernando Valley, including several routes along the private right-of-way Metro Rapidway Metro Orange Line (route 901) dedicated exclusively for MTA vehicles that replicates many PE thru lines by transferring buses.

The Metro Green Line opened in 1995. Its right-of-way was planned from inception to be entirely isolated and protected, running in the median of Interstate 105, the Century Freeway west from Norwalk, connecting at Rosa Parks Station with Metro Blue Line, then further west to Los Angeles International Airport, and then south on elevated tracks to Redondo Beach. The Century Freeway, named for Century Boulevard the equivalent of 100th Street, was the world's first freeway built to bypass and relieve traffic congestion from another freeway – the 91, Artesia Freeway. It reutilized a segment of the West Santa Ana Branch for its part of its route.

The Metro Gold Line opened in 2003, connecting downtown Los Angeles to Pasadena. Mostly at-grade, the line runs along the former Atchison, Topeka & Santa Fe Railroad (AT&SF) historic Super Chief right-of-way, which was converted to dual track overhead electric light rail. California's oldest surviving iron railroad bridge, built across the Arroyo Seco (1895), was also included in the conversion. The Gold Line Eastside Extension now connects Union Station, Downtown Los Angeles to East Los Angeles. A second extension extended east from Pasadena, again utilizing the former AT&SF right-of-way in the median of Interstate 210.

Metrolink provides weekday interurban commuters with high speed reversible trains – consisting of Diesel Locomotives hauling double-deck high capacity passenger cars servicing much of Los Angeles County and operating to connections in Ventura County, San Bernardino County, Riverside County, Orange County, and San Diego County as well.

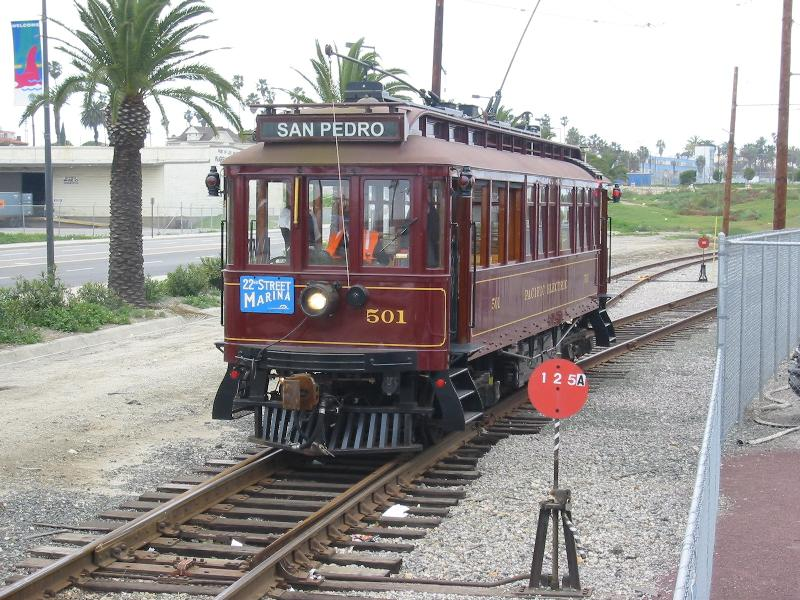
Waterfront Red Car in San Pedro, California. No. #501 PE "Huntington" type wooden streetcar is a replica operated on heritage tracks

Waterfront Red Car 1.5-mile (2 km) was a streetcar line connecting the World Cruise Center south to Ports O' Call and the 22nd Street terminal, where a shuttle bus connected other attractions along the San Pedro waterfront. Two newly constructed Red Car replicas, #500 & #501, provided service along the line on cruise ship arrival/departure days as well as weekends – Friday, Saturday and Sunday. In addition, a restored 1907-vintage Pacific Electric car, No. #1508 originally rebuilt from two wrecks as a unique motor coach, was available for special rail excursions. It began operation as a tourist attraction on July 19, 2003. The last day of service was on September 27, 2015. The Port of Los Angeles financed, constructed and operated the replica equipment on heritage PE track, one of many of its waterfront revival projects. A new pedestrian esplanade featuring public art and fountains, sculpture and fountains was built alongside the track from the World Cruise Center to the Maritime Museum and Fire Boat Station. It connected to the Cabrillo Marine Aquarium and other San Pedro attractions when using the Waterfront Red Car trolley/shuttle. There were plans to extend the Waterfront Red Car line approximately two more miles south to the Cabrillo Marine Aquarium and the tidepools of Cabrillo Beach, which never came to pass. Plans for an extension of the line north into Wilmington to Avalon Boulevard along existing trackage were discussed as a part of the waterfront improvement plan. These same plans led to this line being discontinued in favor of redevelopment. Some transit advocates proposed linking this line to the Metro Blue Line Long Beach terminus, a very intensive and expensive expansion.

The E Line (formerly the Expo Line from 2012–2019) is a 22-mile (35 km) light rail line in Los Angeles County, California, running between Santa Monica to East Los Angeles. It is one of the six lines in the Los Angeles Metro Rail system and is operated by the Los Angeles County Metropolitan Transportation Authority (Metro).

The western portion of the E line was originally named the Expo Line after Exposition Boulevard, along which it runs for most of its route, the line was renamed the E Line in late 2019, while retaining the aqua-colored line and icons used to designate it on maps. After the Regional Connector opened on June 16, 2023, the original E Line was joined with the Eastside portion of the L Line to create the current extended E Line, which is colored gold on maps.

The K Line is a light rail line running north-south between the Jefferson Park and Westchester neighborhoods of Los Angeles, California, passing through various South Los Angeles neighborhoods and the city of Inglewood. It is one of six lines in the Los Angeles Metro Rail system operated by the Los Angeles County Metropolitan Transportation Authority (LACMTA). It was opened on October 7, 2022, making it the system's newest line.

The current K Line represents the initial operating segment of the Crenshaw/LAX Line project, which began construction in 2014. A segment connecting to the C Line via a wye opened in November 2024; the C and K Lines were integrated and services realigned at that time. The C Line's western terminus was also redirected to the LAX/Metro Transit Center and the K Line extended to Redondo Beach station in June 2025. A connection to the new SkyLink is planned for 2026.

The Regional Connector Transit Project constructed a 1.9-mile (3.1 km) light rail tunnel for the Los Angeles Metro Rail system in Downtown Los Angeles. It connected the A and E lines with the former L Line. The A and E lines previously both terminated at 7th Street/Metro Center station, while the L Line ran through Little Tokyo/Arts District to either Azusa or East Los Angeles. The project provides a one-seat ride into the core of Downtown for passengers on those lines who previously needed to transfer, thus reducing or altogether eliminating many transfers of passengers traveling across the region via Downtown Los Angeles.

Hybrid rail (known as the Arrow) was designed to connect the city center of San Bernardino with the University of Redlands via the Redlands Subdivision and opened in October 2022. It also is the first line in the country with a zero-emission, hydrogen-operated passenger train, starting in 2025.

The "Foothill Extension" of the Gold Line has continued with Phase 2 to extend the service to Montclair. As of March 2020, there was some support for extending the Gold Line to Ontario International Airport, though there are neither plans nor funding for this segment as of 2022. The line opened to Azusa on March 5, 2016. Phase 2B of the Foothill Extension began construction on July 10, 2020. The extension opened on September 19, 2025.

=== Proposed developments ===
In 2005, with growing congestion along Wilshire Boulevard to the Westside, then Congressman Henry Waxman introduced legislation to repeal the ban on federal dollars being used for subway tunneling underneath Wilshire Boulevard he had caused to be enacted 20 years earlier. The ban resulted in the Red Line subway ending at Wilshire and Western Avenue before being re-routed up Vermont Avenue towards the Valley. In 2006, the MTA renamed the line from Union Station to Wilshire/Western the Purple Line to differentiate it from the Red Line, which splits at Wilshire/Vermont. As a result, in May 2012, the MTA approved plans to extend the Purple Line to the west as far as the VA Hospital in Westwood, on an alignment mostly following Wilshire Boulevard, the city's most densely populated corridor, as was originally planned in mass transit plans designed as early as the 1920s. In 2005, Mayor Antonio Villaraigosa made as one of his most publicized campaign promises a pledge to set the wheels in motion for eventual construction of the "Subway to the Sea" as he called it. Construction finally began in 2014 on the Purple Line Extension, with the first phase to LaCienega Boulevard scheduled for completion in 2026, and full completion to the VA Hospital campus in West Los Angeles is expected to open in 2028.

Also under consideration is a new passenger rail line on the abandoned Harbor Subdivision railway corridor, connecting Carson to downtown Los Angeles via Torrance and the LA west side. Connections to the Harbor Subdivision from the World Cruise Center cruise ship terminal in the San Pedro District of Los Angeles Harbor to the Long Beach Transit Mall and the Metro Blue Line are also under evaluation.

The West Santa Ana Branch was acquired by local transit agencies with the intent to reactivate the line for rail transit. The Southeast Gateway Line project aims install a new light rail line to Artesia. On the south end of the line, the Orange County Transportation Authority is constructing the OC Streetcar, a modern streetcar system expected to commence service in Spring 2026.

== Legacy ==
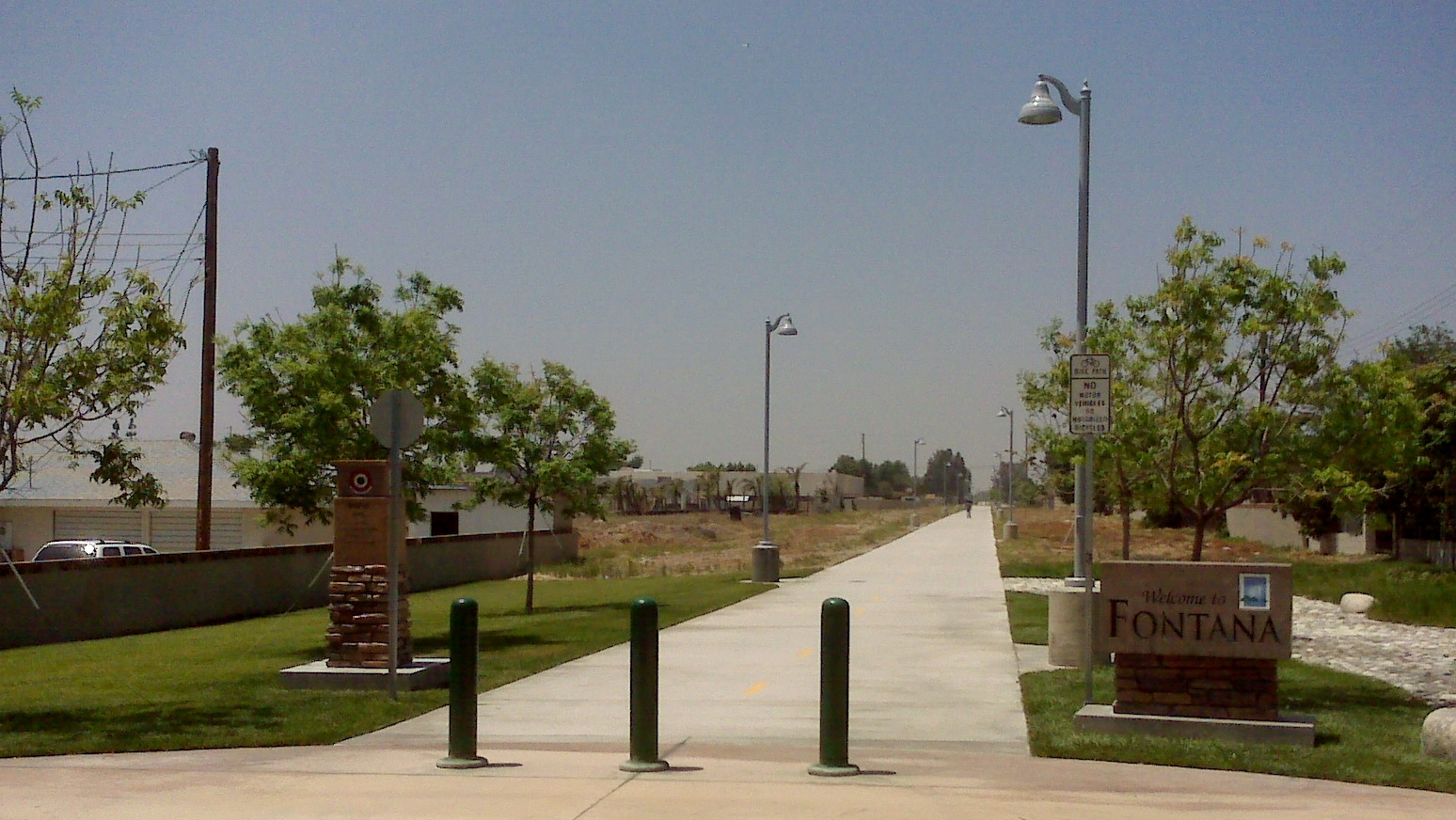
Pacific Electric Inland Empire Trail, Fontana

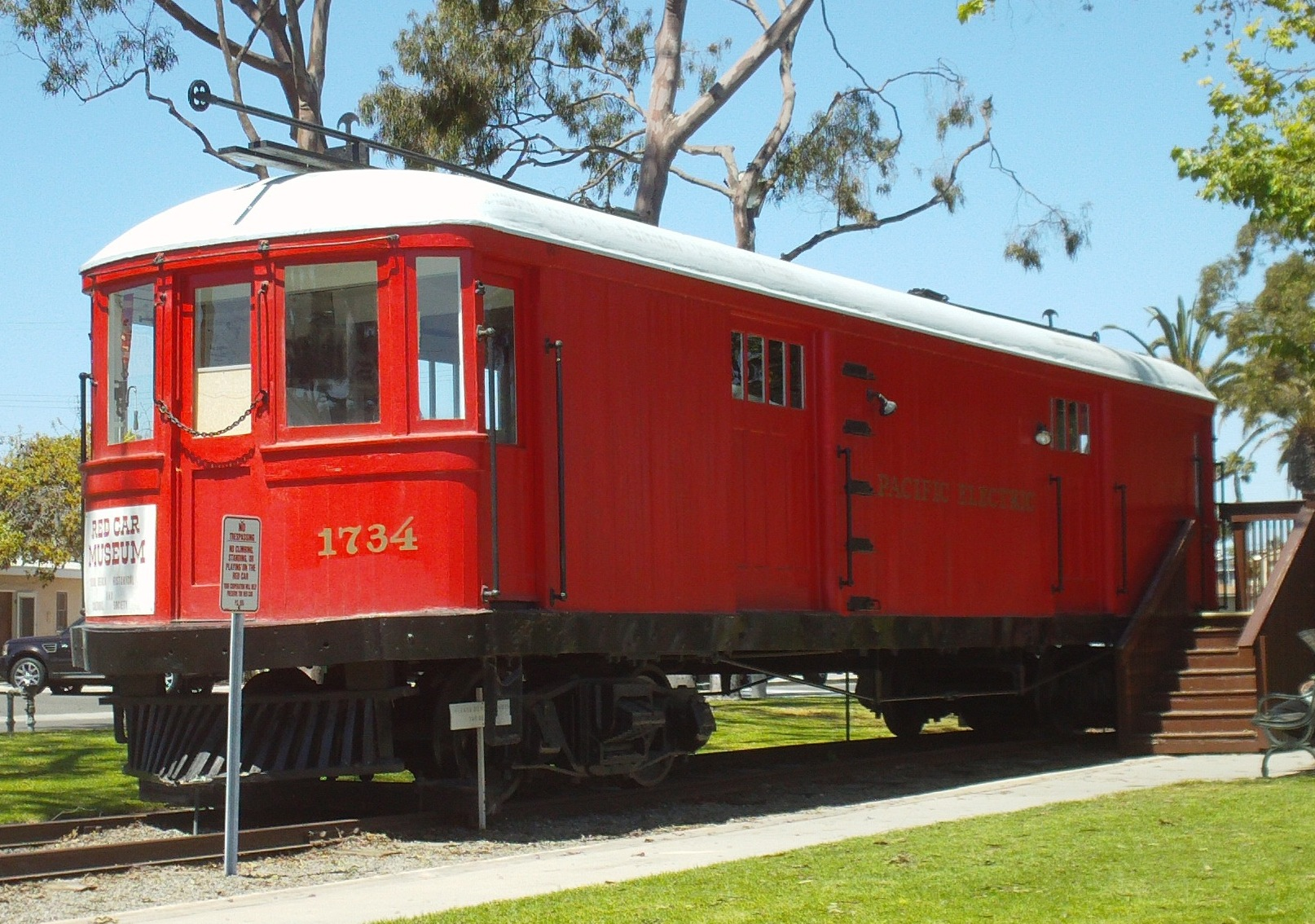
Car #1734 served as the Red Car Museum between 1981 and 2021, at the corner of Main Street and Electric Avenue in Seal Beach, California.

The Pacific Electric Trail is a 21-mile (34 km) rail trail that has been constructed along the former Upland–San Bernardino Line. As of March 2013, approximately 21 miles (34 km) have been completed, from the planned western terminus at Huntington Drive in Claremont (Note: 34.09528°N 117.70274°W) to the temporary eastern terminus at Cactus Avenue in Rialto, (Note: 34.101406°N 117.383608°W) as well as connection to a 6.9-mile (11.1 km) rail trail project being planned to run from Claremont to San Dimas.

Plot elements of the 1988 movie Who Framed Roger Rabbit are loosely based on folklore about the decline of streetcars in LA.

A transportation attraction based on the PE, the Red Car Trolley, is located at Disney California Adventure Park at the Disneyland Resort in Anaheim. It features two stylized replicas of PE rolling stock and is the first attraction in the park to provide transportation, running from Buena Vista Street to Guardians of the Galaxy – Mission: Breakout! in Hollywood Land, with four stations. Construction began on January 4, 2010, and the attraction opened on June 15, 2012. The Ghost Town & Calico Railroad attraction at Knott's Berry Farm uses a PE depot formerly located at Hansen station along the ROW in Stanton as the main station building. The building was moved to the theme park in 1952.

== Routes ==
Northern Division:

- Alhambra–San Gabriel
- Annandale
- Arlington–Corona
- Arrowhead
- Covina
- East Washington
- El Monte–Baldwin Park
- Highland
- Lamanda Park
- Monrovia–Glendora
- Mount Lowe
- North Lake
- Pasadena Short Line
- Pasadena via Oak Knoll
- Ontario–San Antonio Heights
- Pomona
- Pomona–Claremont
- Redlands
- Riverside–Arlington
- Riverside–Rialto
- San Bernardino–Riverside
- San Dimas
- San Dimas Local
- Shorb
- Sierra Madre
- Sierra Vista Local
- South Pasadena Local
- Upland–Ontario
- Upland–San Bernardino

Western Division:

- Brush Canyon
- Coldwater Canyon
- Echo Park Avenue
- Edendale Local
- Glendale–Burbank
- Hollywood
- Lankershim–Van Nuys
- Laurel Canyon
- Owensmouth
- Redondo Beach via Playa del Rey
- San Fernando
- Santa Monica Air Line
- Sawtelle
- Sherman
- Soldiers' Home
- Venice–Inglewood
- Venice–Playa del Rey
- Venice Short Line
- West 16th Street
- Western and Franklin Avenue
- Westgate

Southern Division:

- American Avenue
- Balboa
- Bellflower
- Catalina Dock
- East Seventh Street
- East Third Street
- Fullerton
- Hawthorne–El Nido
- Hawthorne–El Segundo
- Huntington Beach–La Bolsa
- La Habra–Yorba Linda
- Long Beach
- Long Beach–San Pedro
- Redondo Beach via Gardena
- San Pedro via Dominguez
- San Pedro via Gardena
- Santa Ana
- Santa Ana–Huntington Beach
- Santa Ana–Orange
- Seal Beach
- Seal Beach–Huntington Beach–Newport Beach
- Terminal Island
- Torrance
- Watts
- Whittier

=== Tourism loops ===
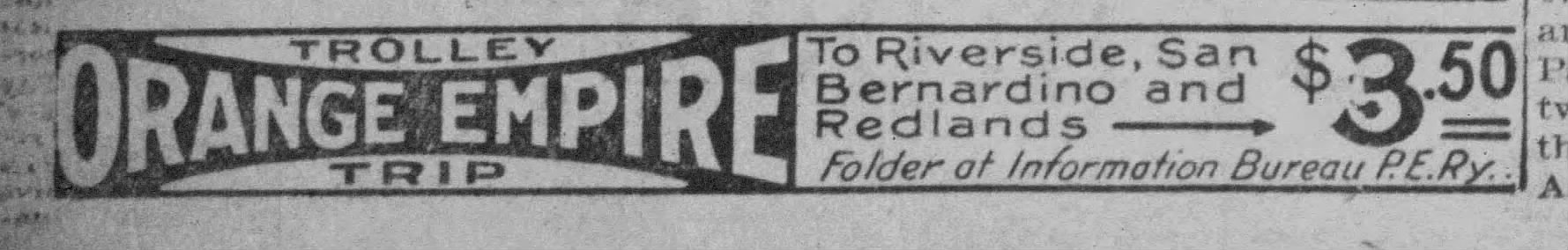
Los Angeles Evening Post-Record, June 10, 1919

- Balloon Route
- Old Mission Trip: Los Angeles to Mission San Gabriel
- Triangle Trip: Long Beach, Balboa, Santa Ana
- Orange Empire Excursion: San Bernardino, Redlands, Riverside

== Facilities ==
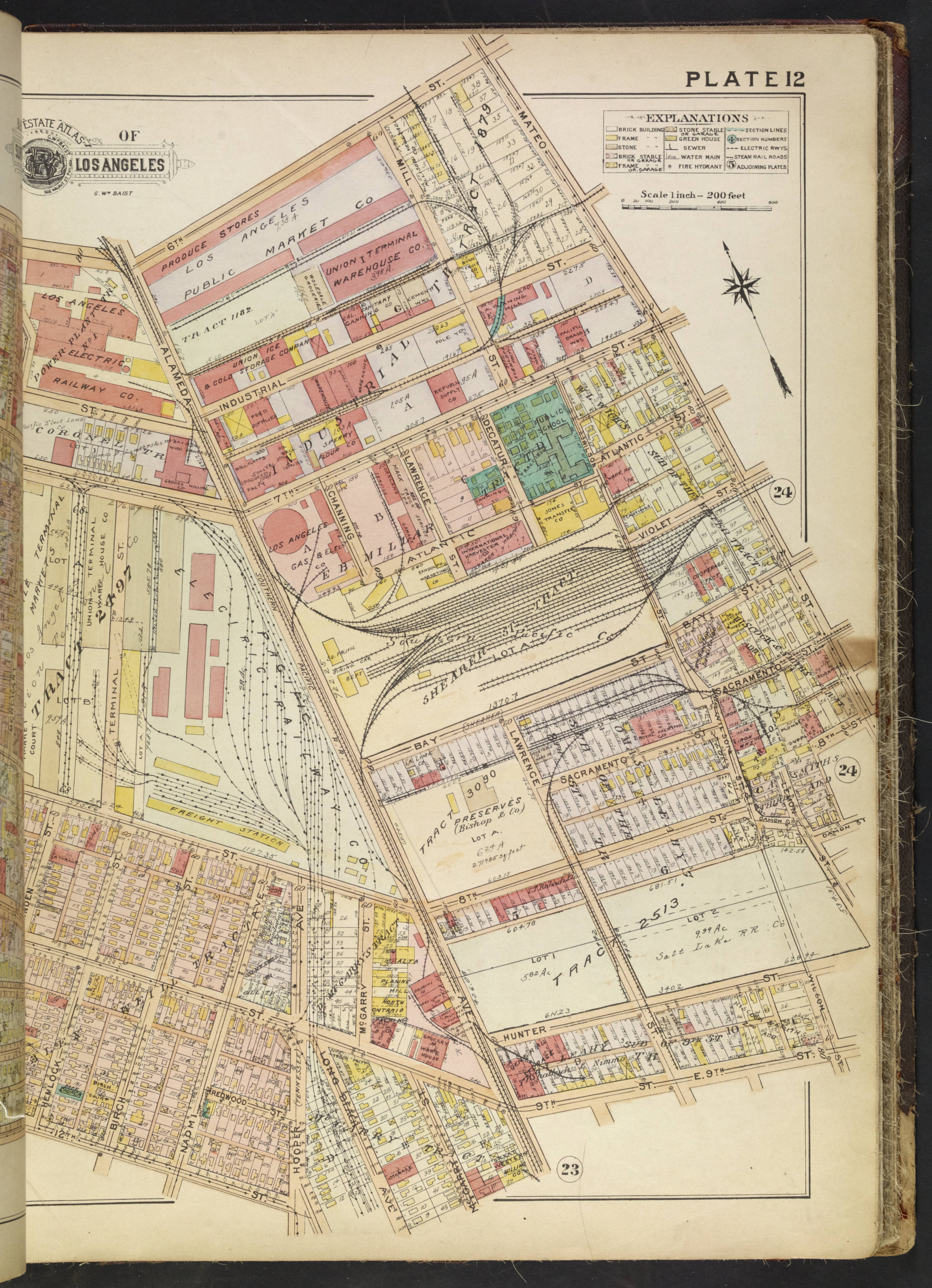
PE tracks near downtown, 1921

The Pacific Electric railway electrification system was based on 600 volt direct current power delivered to cars via overhead line. The San Bernardino Line operated partially at 1200 volts DC.

Some maintenance and operational sites include:

- West Hollywood Car Barn and Yard
- Ocean Park Car Barn and Yard
- Torrance Shops
- Pacific Electric Building (Station at 6th & Main Streets)
- Subway Terminal Building (Station at 4th and Hill Streets)
- Belmont Tunnel (Hollywood Subway)
- Substation No. 8
- Substation No. 14
- Ivy Substation
- Redlands Trolley Barn

== Fleet ==
The number of cars that Pacific Electric owned after the merger would require its own separate page.

=== Passenger cars ===
Manufacturer	Model	Entered service	Fleet Series	Quantity	Year of retirement	Notes	Image
St. Louis	"Baby Five"	1902	200–229; 500–529	30	1934	First cars built new for Pacific Electric. Renumbered in 1911. Car 524 maintained at the Southern California Railway Museum	
St. Louis	"Medium Five"	1909	230–249; 530–549	20	1934	Renumbered in 1911. Car 530 maintained at the Southern California Railway Museum	
[data missing]	[data missing]	[data missing]	250–	[data missing]	[data missing]		
[data missing]	"Big Five"	1911	550–599	50	[data missing]	Acquired from Los Angeles Pacific Railroad	
J. G. Brill	Birney	1918	320–339	20	1941		
J. G. Brill	Birney	1920	340–388	49	1941		
Pullman, American Car and Foundry	Blimp	c. 1906	400–	[data missing]	1961		
Pacific Electric	motor car	1904	600–602	3	[data missing]	Rebuilt from former San Francisco cars	
Pacific Electric	express car	c. 1904	[data missing]	6	[data missing]	Rebuilt from former San Francisco cars	
Pacific Electric	trailer	c. 1904	[data missing]	6	[data missing]	Rebuilt from former San Francisco cars	
St. Louis	Hollywood car	1922	600–649	50	1949	Most cars rebuilt and renumbered to 5050 series interurban cars	
St. Louis	Hollywood car	1924	650–699	50	1949	Most cars rebuilt and renumbered to 5050 series interurban cars	
J. G. Brill	Hollywood car	1924	700–749	50	1949	Most cars rebuilt and renumbered to 5050 series interurban cars	
St. Louis	Hollywood car	1928	750–759	10	1949	Most cars rebuilt and renumbered to 5050 series interurban cars	
American	interurban	[data missing]	800–	[data missing]	[data missing]		
Jewett	"Business Car"	1912	1000	1	1947	Upgraded from regular car in 1913	
Jewett	MU interurban	1912	1001–	[data missing]	1954		
Standard Steel	interurban car	[data missing]	1100–	[data missing]	[data missing]	Hammond, Indiana	
Pressed Steel	Steel Cars	1915	1200–1224	25	[data missing]		
Brill	Dragons	1921	300–319	11	1934		
Pullman	Portland MU interurban	1912	1252	[data missing]	[data missing]		
Pullman	"Business Car"	1929	1299	1	[data missing]	Built in 1912 for the Southern Pacific Red Electric Lines, rebuilt for PE service	
Pullman-Standard	PCC	1940	5000–5029	30	1955	Sold to General Urquiza Railway in 1958	
Pacific Electric	5050 Series	1949	5050–	[data missing]	1951–1958	Rebuilt from Hollywood cars. 28 cars sold to General Urquiza Railway in 1952. 8 cars sold to Portland Traction Company in 1953. 16 cars retained for Los Angeles Metropolitan Transit Authority service and renumbered 1600 series. Five maintained at Southern California Railway Museum.	
St. Louis	MU coach	1907	[data missing]	[data missing]	1950		
St. Louis	Blimp MU	1930	[data missing]	[data missing]	1959		
Pullman	Blimp MU coach	1913	[data missing]	61	1961		
Pullman	Blimp MU baggage coach	1913	[data missing]	61	1959		
American	trailer coach	1908	[data missing]	[data missing]	1934		
Pullman	officer's car	1912	[data missing]	[data missing]	1958		
J.G. Brill	Portland RPO-baggage	1913	[data missing]	[data missing]	1959		
St. Louis	double-truck Birney	1925	[data missing]	[data missing]	1941		
Pullman	Submarine	1912	[data missing]	[data missing]	1928		

=== Work cars ===
- LAP trolley wire greaser 1898–1957
- PE tower car 1915–1957

=== Locomotives ===
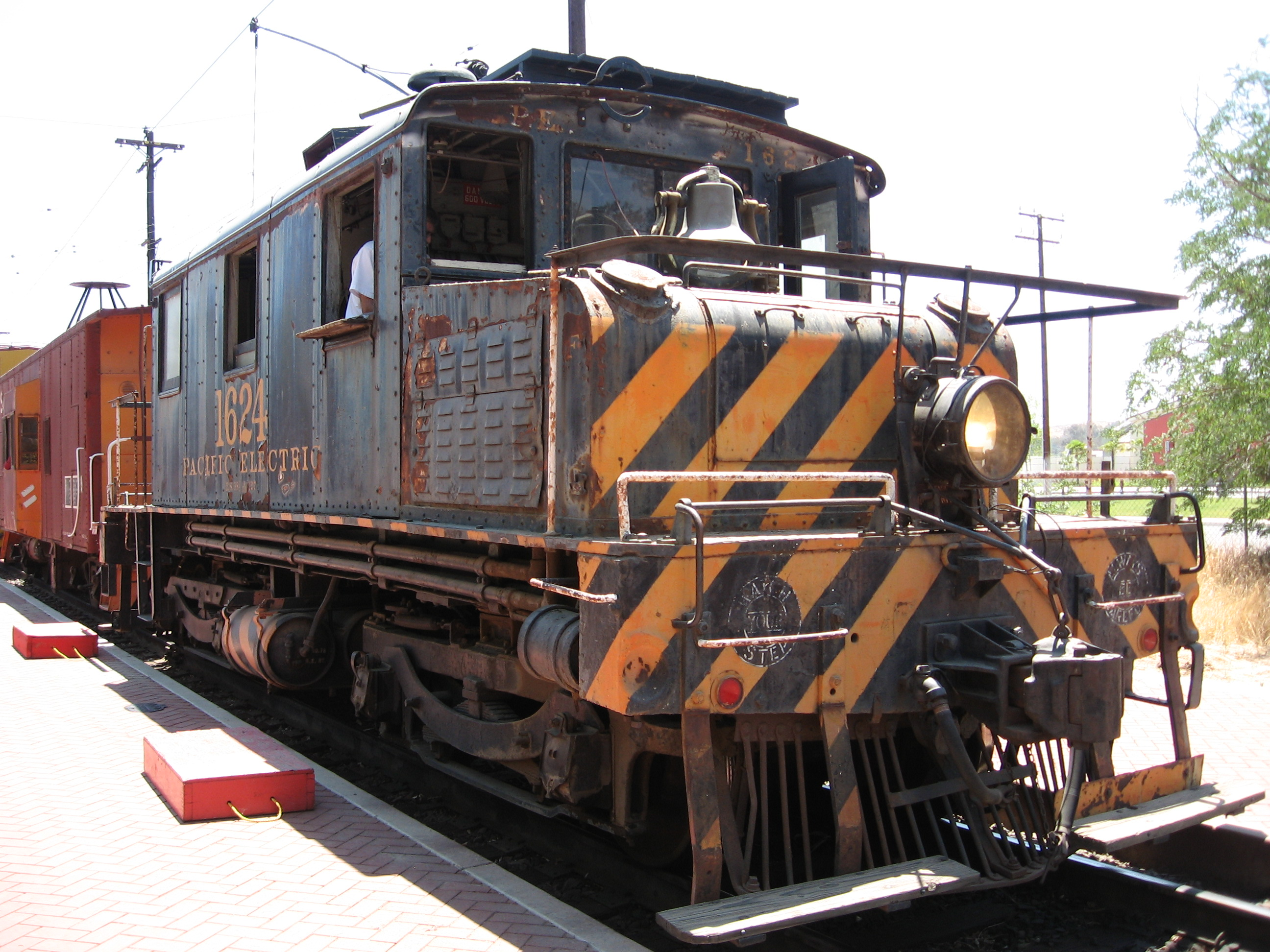
Pacific Electric 1624 "Juice Jack"

- 1600 class BLW Class D electric locomotives
- 1500 class BLW Class B electric locomotives

Pacific Electric 1590

=== Freight cars ===
- LA&R flat-top caboose 1896
- PE flat-top caboose PE 1939
- LS&MS caboose 1915
- LV caboose 1926
- RF&P caboose 1905
- SSC box car 1924

=== Buses ===
- GM yellow coach

Model	Entered service	Fleet Series	Quantity	Year of retirement	Notes	Image
GM PD-4101	1950	225-232	8			

== See also ==
- Bibliography of Los Angeles
- Outline of the history of Los Angeles
- Bibliography of California history
- Belmont Tunnel
- Historic Downtown Los Angeles Streetcar
- Los Angeles Railway
- Pacific Electric Building
- Pacific Electric Railroad Bridge
- Redlands Trolley Barn
- San Diego Electric Railway
- Streetcars in Los Angeles
- Subway Terminal Building

== Bibliography ==
- Bail, Eli (1984). From Railway to Freeway Pacific Electric and the Motor Coach. Interurban Press. ISBN 978-0-916374-61-7. OCLC 10429744.
- Bottles, Scott (1991). Los Angeles and the Automobile: The Making of the Modern City. University of California Press. ISBN 978-0-520-07395-1. OCLC 847508292.
- Coscia, David (2011). Pacific Electric and the Growth of the San Fernando Valley. Bellflower, CA: Shade Tree Books. ISBN 978-1-57864-735-4.
- Copeland, Allen P. (1997). Pacific Electric in Color, Vol 1. Scotch Plains, NJ.: Morning Sun Books. ISBN 978-1-878887-88-7.
- —— (1999). Pacific Electric in Color, Vol 2. Scotch Plains, NJ.: Morning Sun Books. ISBN 978-1-58248-024-4.
- —— (2002). California Trolleys in Color Vol.1. Scotch Plains, NJ.: Morning Sun Books. ISBN 978-1-58248-076-3.
- Crise, Steve & Patris, Michael A. (2011). Pacific Electric Railway (Then and Now). Charleston, SC: Arcadia Publishing.
- Crump, Spencer (1977). Ride The Big Red Cars: How Trolleys Helped Build Southern California. Corona Del Mar, CA: Trans-Anglo Books. ISBN 978-0-87046-047-0. OL 4560875M.
- —— (1978). Henry Huntington and the Pacific Electric Railway: A Pictorial Album. Corona Del Mar, CA: Trans-Anglo Books. ISBN 978-0-87046-048-7.
- Demoro, Harre W. (1986). California's Electric Railways. Glendale, California: Interurban Press. ISBN 978-0-916374-74-7. OCLC 13703105.
- Duke, Donald. (1958). Pacific Electric: A Pictorial Album of Electric Railroading. San Marino, CA: Golden West Books.
- —— (2001). Pacific Electric Railway, Volume 1: The Northern Division. San Marino, CA.: Golden West Books. ISBN 978-0-87095-117-6.
- —— (2002). Pacific Electric Railway, Volume 2: The Eastern Division. San Marino, CA.: Golden West Books. ISBN 978-0-87095-117-6.
- —— (2003). Pacific Electric Railway, Volume 3: The Southern Division. San Marino, CA.: Golden West Books. ISBN 978-0-87095-117-6.
- —— (2004). Pacific Electric Railway, Volume 4: The Western Division. San Marino, CA.: Golden West Books. ISBN 978-0-87095-117-6.
- Friedricks, William B. (1992). Henry Huntington and the Creation of Southern California. Columbus, OH.: Ohio University Press. ISBN 978-0-8142-0553-2.
- Heller, Jim, ed. (1998). Pacific Electric Stations. Long Beach, CA: Electric Railway Historical Association of Southern California. ISBN 978-0-9664304-0-0.
- Howard, Danny (1980). Southern California and the Pacific Electric. Los Angeles, CA.: Daniel L. Howard Publishing. ISBN 978-0-936144-00-9.
- Kaplan, Sam Hall (1987). L.A. Lost & Found. Crown Publishers, Inc. ISBN 0-517-56184-0.
- Karr, Randolph (1973). Rail Passenger Service History of the Pacific Electric (PDF). Los Angeles, CA: Southern Pacific Transportation.
- Kuntsler, James Howard (1993). The Geography of Nowhere – The Rise and Decline of America's Man-Made Landscape (First Touchstone Edition 1994 ed.). New York, New York: Touchstone. ISBN 978-0-671-70774-3. OCLC 27726774.
- Long, Raphael (1966). Pacific Electric's Big Red Cars; A Pictorial Account of the Decline of the World's Largest Interurban Electric Railway System. Los Angeles, CA: T.C. Phillips.
- —— (1983). Red Car Days, Interurbans Special #92. Glendale, CA: Interurbans Press.
- —— (2010). Red Car Era An Album: Memories of Los Angeles and the Pacific Electric Railway. CreateSpace. ISBN 978-1-4528-4475-6.
- Seims, Charles (1976). Mount Lowe The Railway in the Clouds. San Marino, CA: Golden West Books. ISBN 978-0-87095-075-9. OL 4901217M.
- —— (1982). Trolley Days in Pasadena. San Marino, CA: Golden West Books. ISBN 978-0-87095-086-5.
- Shanks, Thomas H. (1991). From Horse Car to Red Car to Mass Rapid Transit: A Century of Progress. Virginia Beach, VA: Donning Company. ISBN 978-0898658200.
- Smatlak, John C. (2010). Pacific Electric 500-Class cars: Interurban Pioneers. Bellflower, CA: Shade Tree Books. ISBN 978-0930742386.
- Swett, Ira & Walker, Jim (1975). Lines of the Pacific Electric Southern and Western Districts, Interurbans Special #60. Glendale, CA: Interurbans Publications. ISBN 0-916374-02-5. OCLC 2119913.
- —— & —— (1976). Lines of the Pacific Electric, Northern and Eastern Districts, Interurbans Special #61. Glendale, CA: Interurbans Publications. OCLC 8283871.
- —— (1964). Cars of the Pacific Electric Volume 1: City and Suburban Cars, Interurbans Special #28. Los Angeles, CA: Interurbans.
- —— (1965). Cars of the Pacific Electric Volume 2: Interurban and Deluxe Cars, Interurbans Special #36. Los Angeles, CA: Interurbans.
- —— (1965). Cars of the Pacific Electric Volume 3: Locomotives and Non-Revenue Cars, Interurbans Special #37. Los Angeles, CA: Interurbans.
- —— (1965). Pacific Electric Album of Cars, Interurbans Special #39. Los Angeles, CA: Interurbans.
- —— (1969). Pacific Electric in Pomona, Interurbans Special #46. Los Angeles, CA: Interurbans.
- —— (1964). Official Car Records of the Pacific Electric Railway, Interurbans Special #38. Los Angeles, CA: Interurbans.
- —— (1946). Pacific Electric All Time Roster, Interurbans Special #3. Los Angeles, CA: Interurbans.
- —— (1952). Pacific Electric All Time Roster, Interurbans Special #13. Los Angeles, CA: Interurbans.
- Thompson, Gregory Lee (1993). The Passenger Train in the Motor Age: California's Rail and Bus Industries, 1910–1941. Ohio State University Press, Columbus, OH. ISBN 978-0-8142-0609-6.
- Veysey, Laurence R. (June 1958). A History Of The Rail Passenger Service Operated By The Pacific Electric Railway Company Since 1911 And By Its Successors Since 1953 (PDF). LACMTA (Report). Los Angeles, California: Interurbans. ASIN B0007F8D84. OCLC 6565577.
- —— (1953). The Pacific Electric Railway Company: 1910–1953: A Study in the Operation of Economic, Social and Political Forces Upon American Local Transportation. Available at Glendale Public Library, California: Seminar paper, Yale. OCLC 7139020.
- Walker, Jim (1991). Last of the Big Red Cars; The Long Beach Rail Line Then and Now, Interurbans Special #118. Glendale, CA: Interurbans Press. ISBN 978-1-56342-001-6. OCLC 24250786.
- —— (2006). Images of Rails Series: Pacific Electric Red Cars. Charleston, SC: Arcadia Publishing. ISBN 978-0-7385-4688-9. OCLC 83991517.

=== Predecessor lines ===
- Myers, William A. & Swett, Ira (1976). Trolleys to the Surf: The Story of the Los Angeles Pacific Railway, Interurbans Special #63. Glendale, CA: Interurbans Publications. ISBN 978-0-916374-22-8. OCLC 2507484.
- Swett, Ira (1956). Los Angeles Pacific, Interurbans Special #18. Los Angeles, CA: Interurbans.
- —— (1965). Los Angeles Pacific Album, Interurbans Special #40. Los Angeles, CA: Interurbans.
- —— (1957). Los Angeles and Redondo Railway, Interurbans Special #20. Los Angeles, CA: Interurbans.
- —— (1962). Riverside and Arlington Railway, Interurbans Special #27. Los Angeles, CA: Interurbans.
- —— (1969). Ontario and San Antonio Heights Railroad, Interurbans Special #48. Los Angeles, CA: Interurbans.
- Van Norden, Rudolph (January 7, 1911). "Pacific Electric Railway Interurban System". Journal of Electricity Power and Gas. XXVI (1). San Francisco, California: Technical Publishing Company. reprinted as Pacific Electric in Transition 1911, Interurbans Special #30. Los Angeles, CA: Interurbans. 1967. OCLC 6219179. OL 24441744M.
