= Santa Ana–Orange Line =

Santa Ana-Orange Line

Santa Ana–Orange

Overview
- Owner: Santa Ana, Orange & Tustin Street Railway (1887–1897); Santa Ana & Orange Motor Company (1897–1901); Interurban Railway Company (May 1901–December 1901); Pacific Electric (1901–1904); Los Angeles Inter-Urban Electric Railway (1904–1911); Pacific Electric (1911–1930)
- Locale: Orange County, California
- Termini: Santa Ana; Orange

Service
- Type: Interurban
- System: Pacific Electric
- Operator: Pacific Electric (1908–1930)

History
- Opened: November 23, 1886
- Closed: September 14, 1930

Technical
- Line length: 4.04 mi (6.50 km)
- Number of tracks: 1–2
- Track gauge: 1,435 mm (4 ft 8 1/2 in) standard gauge
- Electrification: Overhead line, 600 V DC

The Santa Ana–Orange Line is a former Pacific Electric interurban railway line in Orange County, California. Unlike most of the company's services, trains did not travel to Downtown Los Angeles and instead provided a suburban service between Santa Ana and Orange.

== History ==
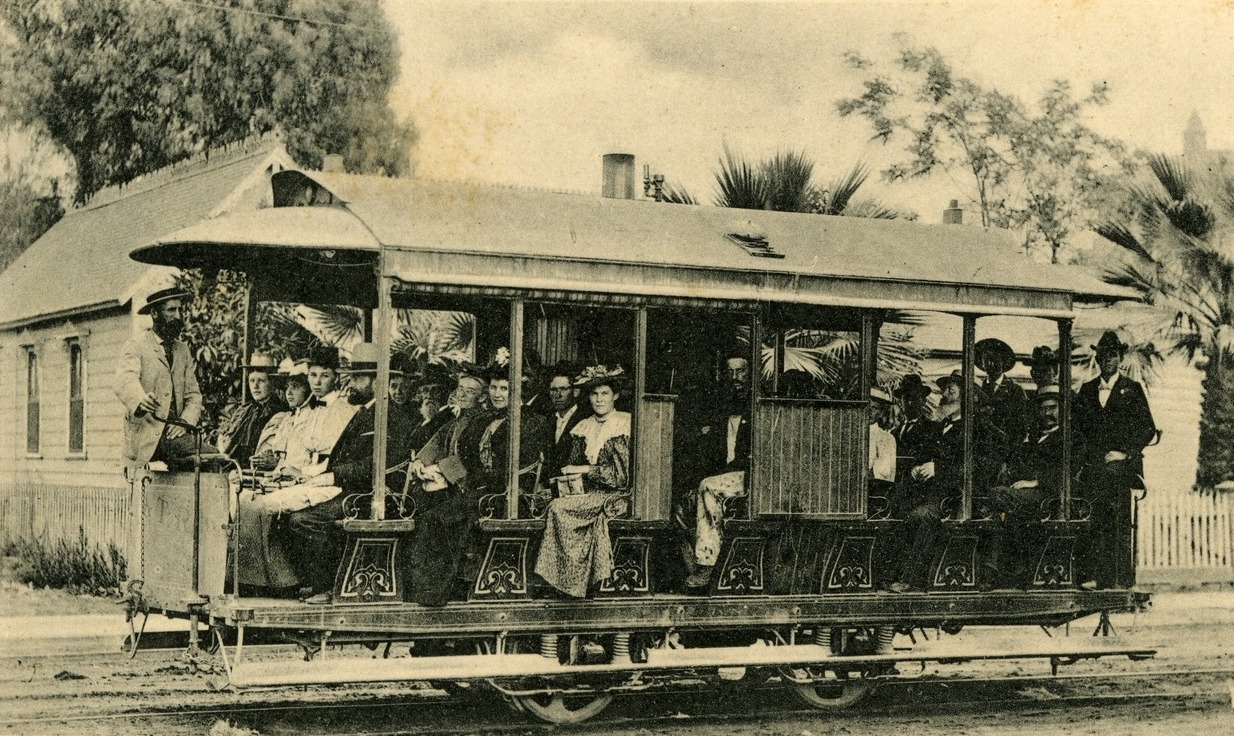
Orange and Santa Ana Motor Railroad car in service, c. 1905

The beginnings of the route are traced back to a horsecar line built between The Plaza in Orange and Fourth Street and French Street in Santa Ana by the Santa Ana, Orange and Tustin Street Railway Company, which began service on November 23, 1886. The route originally extended further in both directions: to El Modena in the north and to Tustin in the south, comprising a total of 12 miles (19 km) of tracks. The line north of Orange was abandoned after a flood took out a critical bridge in 1891, while south of Santa Ana was discontinued due to poor patronage. The Santa Ana & Orange Motor Company acquired the railroad and commenced steam operation in January 1897, which was in turn sold the line to the Interurban Railway Company, which proceeded to sell the railroad to Pacific Electric in 1901. In 1904, Pacific Electric deeded the line to Los Angeles Inter-Urban Electric Railway, who proceeded to rebuild and electrify the route south of Santiago Creek. The new line commenced service on February 10, 1906 — passengers transferred to a steam dummy to complete to trip to Orange. Pacific Electric began operating the line on July 1, 1908, folding it into the system entirely in 1911 as part of the Great Merger.

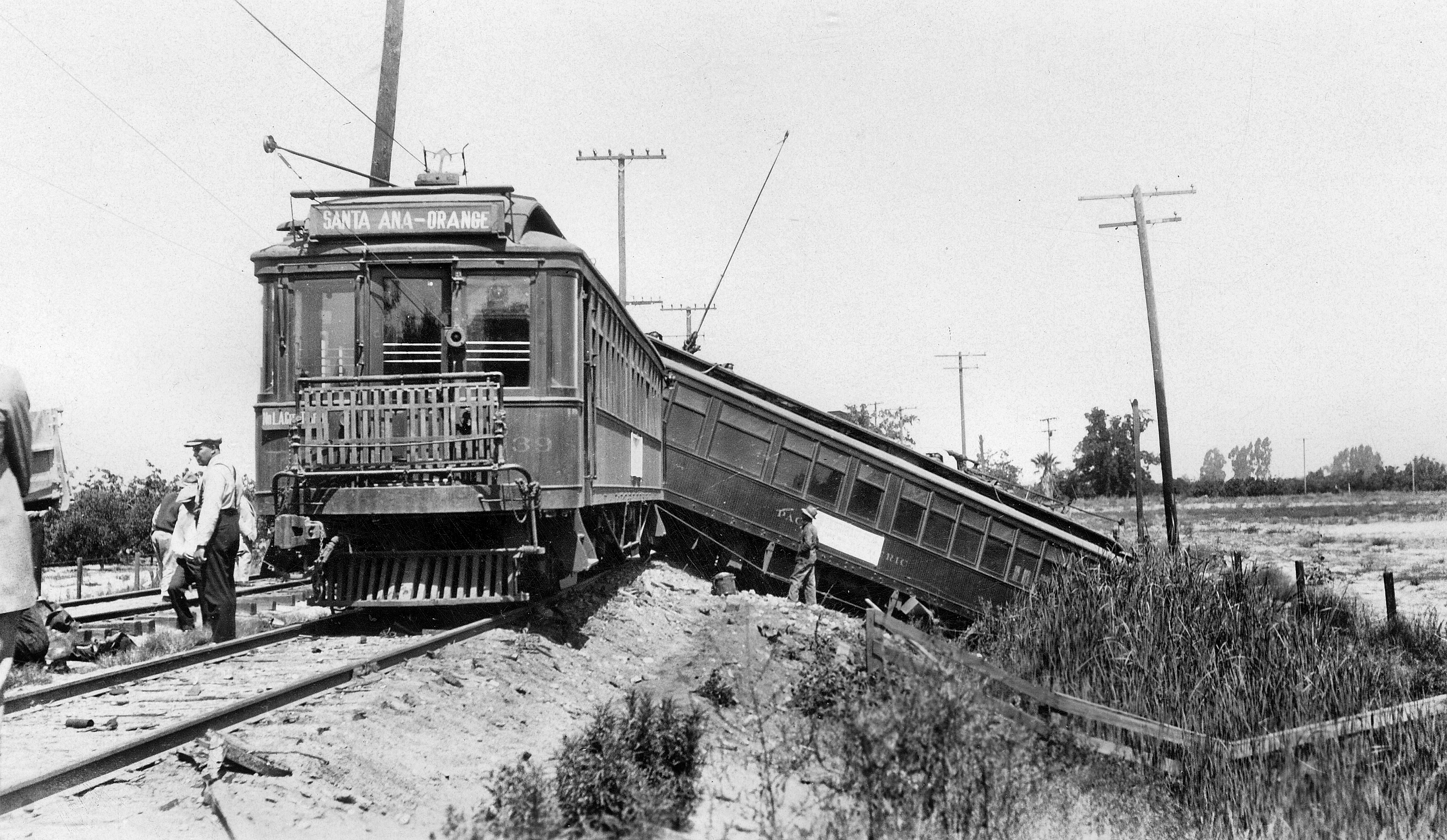
A Santa Ana–Orange Line train derailed after striking a truck, July 1927

The segment of the route between Santiago Creek and The Plaza was electrified by July 11, 1914, allowing for through running and retiring the steam dummy. Frequencies generally increased as the line was more heavily trafficked. However, Pacific Electric's purchase of the Motor Transit Company made the line redundant as the latter was running frequent highway bus service between the two cities. The final car departed Santa Ana on September 14, 1930.

== Operations ==
Tracks north of Orange to Marlboro were used by freight trains and saw no passenger service.

Between 1906 and 1914, passengers transferred from normal interurban cars to a steam dummy at Santiago Creek, as the line lacked electrical infrastructure north of this location. Through service was eventually extended as far as The Plaza in Orange.
