= Owensmouth Line =

Former Pacific Electric interurban service

Owensmouth
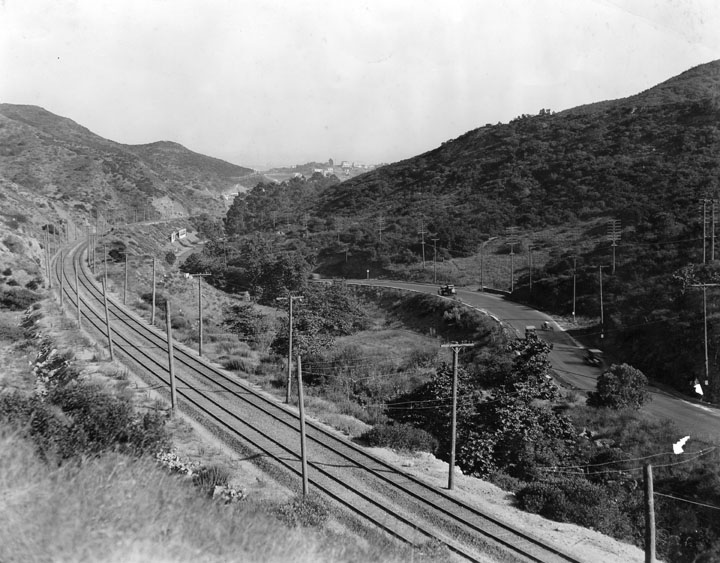
- Cahuenga Pass in 1922 prior to freeway construction

Overview
- Owner: Southern Pacific Railroad
- Locale: Los Angeles and the San Fernando Valley, California
- Termini: Downtown Los Angeles; Owensmouth/Canoga Park (1912–1938) North Sherman Way (1911–1912, 1938–1952)
- Stations: 34

Service
- Type: Interurban
- System: Pacific Electric
- Operator: Pacific Electric
- Rolling stock: PE 5050 Class (last used)
- Ridership: 1,038,622 (1926)

History
- Opened: January 20, 1908 (Cahuenga Pass local); December 16, 1911 (to Van Nuys); December 7, 1912 (Owensmouth)
- Closed: June 1, 1938 (Canoga Park–Sherman Way); December 29, 1952 (all service)

Technical
- Line length: 29.1 mi (46.8 km)
- Track gauge: 4 ft 8 1/2 in (1,435 mm) standard gauge
- Electrification: Overhead line, 600 V DC

The Owensmouth Line was a Pacific Electric interurban service that connected the San Fernando Valley to Downtown Los Angeles. The route was largely developed as the result of real estate speculation along with the San Fernando Line which continued further north. Cars ran from Los Angeles and Hollywood through the Cahuenga Pass to the Valley in a private reservation, even after the Hollywood Freeway was built through the area. The line also utilized a portion of the Southern Pacific Burbank Branch. Service was truncated to Sherman Way in 1938, and cars were then referred to as the Van Nuys Line. All rail service ended December 29, 1952.

== History ==
The Ocean View Tract Company laid out Highland Avenue with a central reservation for future trolley use. Residents along the street had wanted improvements made to the road, but this strip had been an impediment on their plans. On November 21, 1906, the Los Angeles-Pacific Railway (LA-P) sent out a construction to build north of Prospect in the trolley reservation. About two blocks had been plowed up when Hollywood's Street Superintendent, acting under instructions from the City Attorney, arrived with a police officer and ordered the work stopped. The foreman ordered his men to go ahead and the entire outfit was placed under arrest, and later released in bonds of $100 (Note: equivalent to $3,583 in 2025 adjusted for inflation) each. The land in the center of Highland had never been deeded to the city, and the route had been used as a normal thoroughfare since being platted which, as the city claimed, precluded the railway from having title to build a line. Residents appealed to the city to offer a franchise on the road for a street railway, and LA-P purchased the rights the following September for $1000, (Note: equivalent to $34,554 in 2025 adjusted for inflation) a surprising sum. Regular car service began on January 20, 1908, between Santa Monica Boulevard and the city limits. The company quickly filed deeds to extend the line over the pass further north.

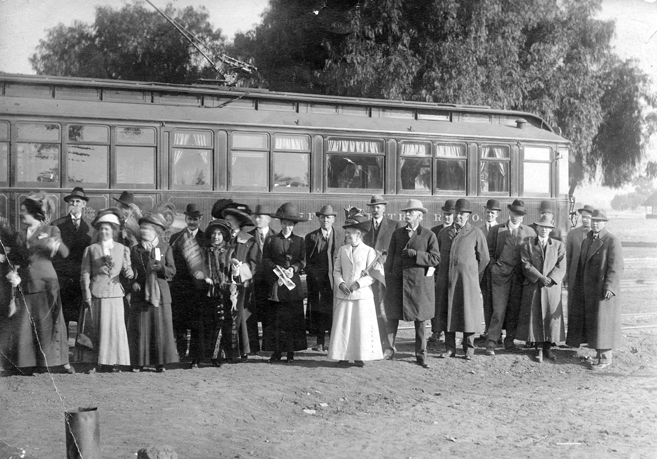
First car to North Hollywood, December 16, 1911

The Pacific Electric streetcar service to Owensmouth (present-day Canoga Park) was part of a real-estate development in Southern California. Nearly the entire southern San Fernando Valley was bought in 1910 by the Los Angeles Suburban Homes Company, owned by a syndicate of wealthy Los Angeles investors, developers, and speculators: including Harrison Gray Otis, Harry Chandler, Moses Sherman, Hobart Johnstone Whitley, and others. It anticipated possible connections to, but was planned independent of, the soon to be completed (1913) Los Angeles Aqueduct from the Owens River watershed to the City of Los Angeles through the San Fernando Valley in Los Angeles County. To help promote sales of the land, General Moses Sherman's Los Angeles Pacific Railroad set off to build a streetcar line across the San Fernando Valley, to serve the three plotted new towns: Van Nuys (1911); Marion (now Reseda); and Owensmouth (now Canoga Park) (1912). At the time, streetcar lines were seen as a necessity to promote development. Alongside it across the Valley westward from Van Nuys was Sherman Way: the "$500,000 paved boulevard" (Note: equivalent to $17.3 million in 2025 adjusted for inflation) with lush landscaping and no speed limit where one might get up to 35 miles per hour (56 km/h), a separate dirt road for farm wagons/equipment, and telegraph lines. The route originally navigated the Cahuenga Pass in its own right-of-way on the west side of the state highway. Los Angeles Pacific Railroad later sold the line to the Pacific Electric. The line opened to Van Nuys on December 16, 1911, extending to Owensmouth on December 7 the following year.

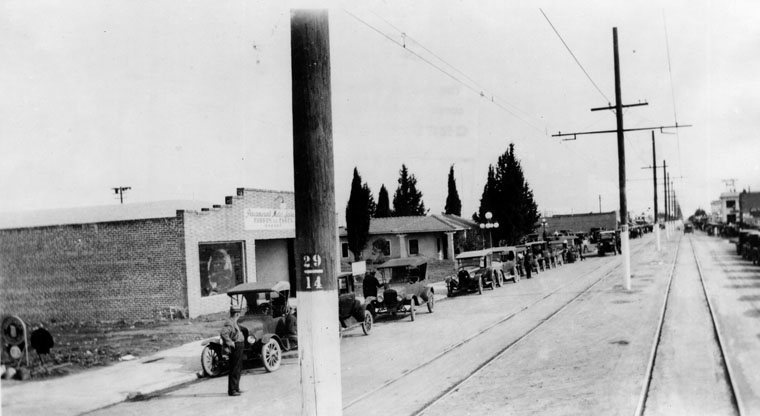
Sherman Way in Owensmouth, 1920, with Los Angeles Pacific Railroad lines

Nearly all trips were routed into the new Hollywood Subway in 1926. When the Hollywood Freeway was built in the 1930s, the line was relocated to the freeway's median strip.

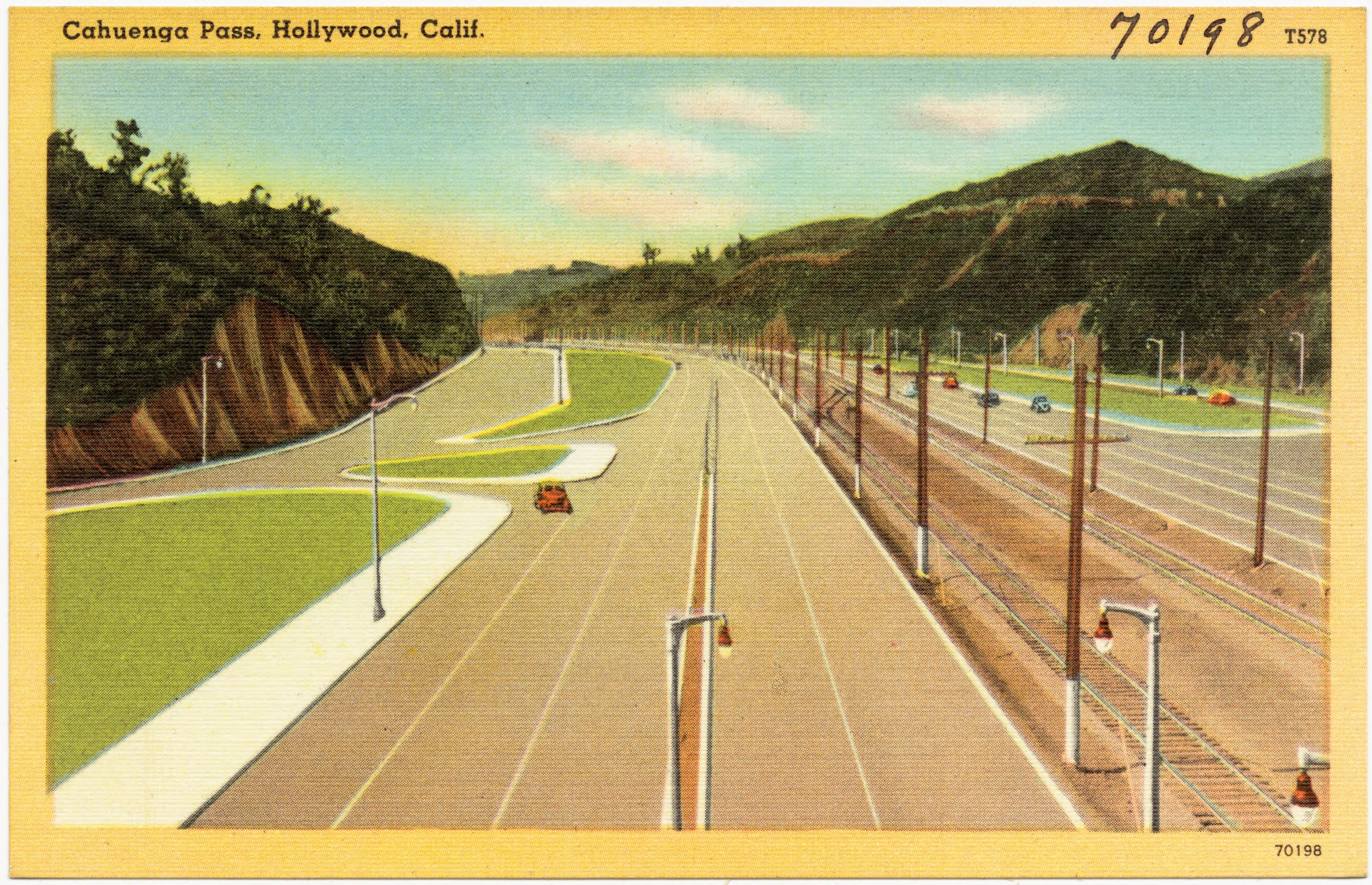
Postcard depicting the private right of way in the Hollywood Freeway median strip (right of center frame), c. 1940

Even as the terminal community changed its name from Owensmouth to Canoga Park in 1931, after the Southern Pacific "Canoga" station there, the name of the Pacific Electric line was unchanged as Owensmouth until the demise of through service. Cars were truncated to North Sherman Way on June 1, 1938, and service was then generally referred to as the Van Nuys Line. The dedicated local cars along Highland Avenue were discontinued and service was then provided by the interurban runs. Unlike other PE lines which saw a decrease in service after World War II, ridership greatly increased in the service's final years. and one-man operation was implemented in 1950. Services were finally replaced by buses on December 28, 1952. An excursion trip ran the following day before the power was shut off.

Most tracks were promptly removed except a few segments used for freight movements. The Hollywood Freeway expanded into the former rail reservation in 1957 which added a lane in each direction. A survey conducted by Caltrans in 1981 reported that almost all of the line had either been removed or paved over for street use.

=== Modern light rail ===
In the 2000s a new cross-Valley rapid transit line was built: the Metro Orange Line, a dedicated bus transit-way which uses part of the old Pacific Electric right-of-way (Chandler Boulevard east of Ethel Avenue) and the former Southern Pacific south and west Valley route (from White Oak Avenue to the Chatsworth station). Service commenced in 2005; it was renamed to the G Line in 2020.

Van Nuys Boulevard is planned to be rebuilt for light rail service in 2031 under the East San Fernando Valley Light Rail Transit Project.

== Route ==
Leaving Downtown on the same tracks as the Hollywood Line, the line continued along the Sherman Line at Sunset Junction before turning north at Highland Avenue. The line continued on its own private right of way through the Cahuenga Pass, turning up Vineland Avenue through North Hollywood, and onto Chandler Boulevard. Proceeding west along the Southern Pacific Burbank Branch to the curve onto Van Nuys Boulevard, it ran through Van Nuys to a curve (Sherman Circle) off of Van Nuys Boulevard turning west onto Sherman Way to Owensmouth. On Shoup Avenue, named after Pacific Electric president Paul Shoup, the center was used as its end of the line sidings.

=== List of major stations ===
Station	Mile	Major connections	Service began	Service ended	City/neighborhood
Canoga Park	29.10		December 7, 1912	June 1, 1938	Owensmouth / Canoga Park
Reseda	24.91		December 7, 1912	June 1, 1938	
North Sherman Way	19.89	San Fernando	December 16, 1911	December 29, 1952	Van Nuys
Van Nuys	19.11	San Fernando	December 16, 1911	December 29, 1952	Van Nuys
Circle Drive	17.72	San Fernando	December 16, 1911	December 29, 1952	
Kester (Ethel Avenue)	16.17	San Fernando	December 16, 1911	December 29, 1952	
Lankershim (later North Hollywood)	14.17	San Fernando	December 16, 1911	December 29, 1952	North Hollywood
Rio Vista	11.59	San Fernando	December 16, 1911	December 29, 1952	
Universal City	11.10	San Fernando	December 16, 1911	December 29, 1952	
Barnham Boulevard	9.99	San Fernando	December 16, 1911	December 29, 1952	
Cahuenga Pass	8.65	San Fernando	January 20, 1908	December 29, 1952	
Highland & Hollywood	7.84	Hollywood, San Fernando, Venice via Hollywood	January 20, 1908	December 29, 1952	Los Angeles
Highland & Santa Monica	7.09	San Fernando, South Hollywood–Sherman	January 20, 1908	December 29, 1952	Los Angeles
Colegrove		San Fernando, South Hollywood–Sherman	December 16, 1911	December 29, 1952	Los Angeles
Virgil Avenue		San Fernando, South Hollywood–Sherman, Western and Franklin Avenue	December 16, 1911	December 29, 1952	Los Angeles
Sunset Junction		Hollywood, San Fernando, South Hollywood–Sherman, Venice via Hollywood, Western and Franklin Avenue	December 16, 1911	December 29, 1952	Los Angeles
Subway Terminal	0	Echo Park Avenue, Glendale–Burbank, Hollywood, San Fernando, Redondo Beach via Playa del Rey, Sawtelle, South Hollywood–Sherman, Venice Short Line, Venice via Hollywood, Western and Franklin Avenue, Westgate	February 7, 1926	December 29, 1952	Los Angeles
Hill Street Station			December 16, 1911	February 6, 1926	Los Angeles

== Rolling stock ==
Initial interurban service was provided by 800 class cars. Fifteen 700 class units were rebuilt in the late 1930s for improved speeds. The last few years of service saw the line operated by 5050 class cars.

== Ridership ==
Passengers (fare and transfer)
Year	Passengers	Car miles (km)	Revenue
1913	368,688	276,895 (445,619)	$81,917
1914	487,907	378,151 (608,575)	$115,228
1916	454,942	315,820 (508,260)	$88,879
1918	499,282	381,858 (614,541)	$101,452
1920	815,483	394,132 (634,294)	$191,198
1922	795,906	494,037 (795,075)	$202,058
1924	912,075	585,773 (942,710)	$219,281
1926	1,038,622	624,206 (1,004,562)	$225,957

== See also ==
- Picover station
- East San Fernando Valley Light Rail Transit Project
