= The Father of Hollywood =

Various individuals have been called "the Father of Hollywood", including:

- Cecil B. DeMille
- Charles E. Toberman
- H. J. Whitley
