= Owensmouth =

Former city in Los Angeles

Coordinates: 34°12′04″N 118°35′50″W

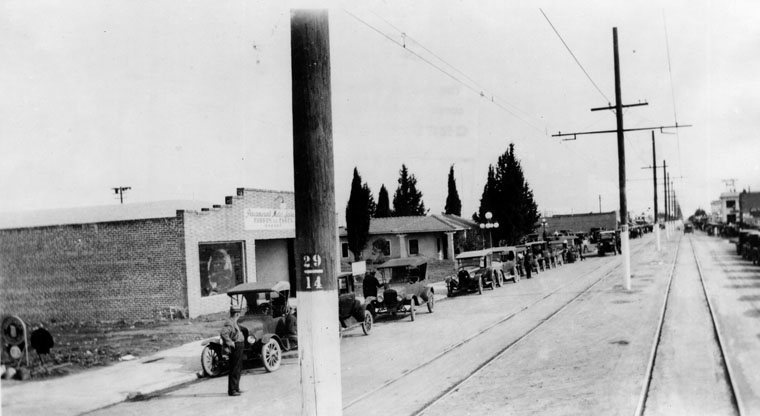
1920 Sherman Way in downtown Owensmouth, with Los Angeles Pacific Railroad lines

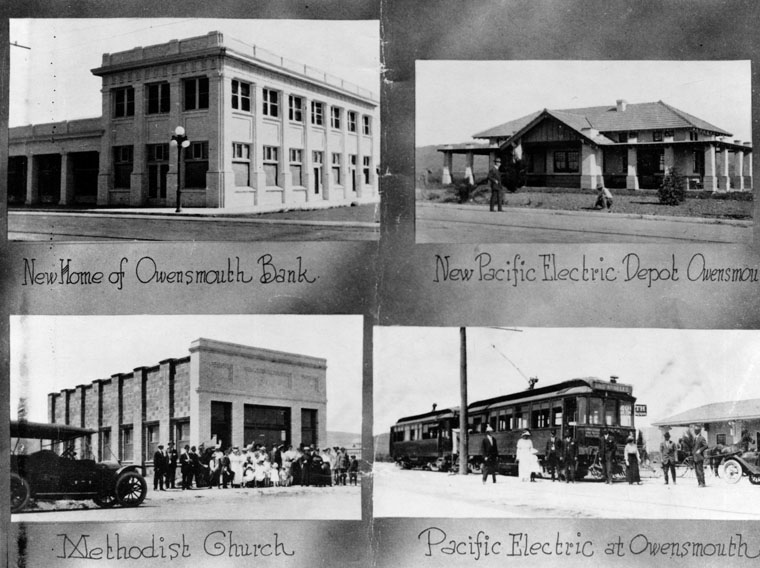
Buildings in Owensmouth 1914.

Owensmouth was a town founded in 1912 in the western part of the San Fernando Valley in Los Angeles County, California. Owensmouth joined the city of Los Angeles in 1917, and was renamed Canoga Park on March 1, 1931. Owensmouth was named for the 1913 Owens River aqueduct's terminus in current Canoga Park.

== History ==
The town was started by the Los Angeles Suburban Homes Company as part of an extraordinary real estate development in Southern California. Los Angeles Suburban Homes Company was owned by a syndicate of rich Los Angeles investors, developers, and speculators: including Harrison Gray Otis, Harry Chandler, Moses Sherman, Hobart Johnstone Whitley, and others. On April 2, 1915, H. J. Whitley purchased the Suburban Home Company so that he would have complete control for finishing the development. It anticipated possible connections to but was planned independent of the soon to be completed (1913) Los Angeles Aqueduct from the Owens River watershed to the City of Los Angeles through the San Fernando Valley in Los Angeles County.The newly built Sherman Way double drive and the Pacific Electric street cars, opened on December 7, 1912, gave new access to the town and to the other new towns in the valley Van Nuys (1911) and Marion (now Reseda); At the time the new road and streetcar seemed like route to an open agricultural fields at the end of the line — but was a necessity to promote development. Sherman Way was a paved boulevard with lush landscaping and no speed limit where one might get up to 35 mph, there was a separate dirt road for farm wagons/equipment, and telegraph lines.

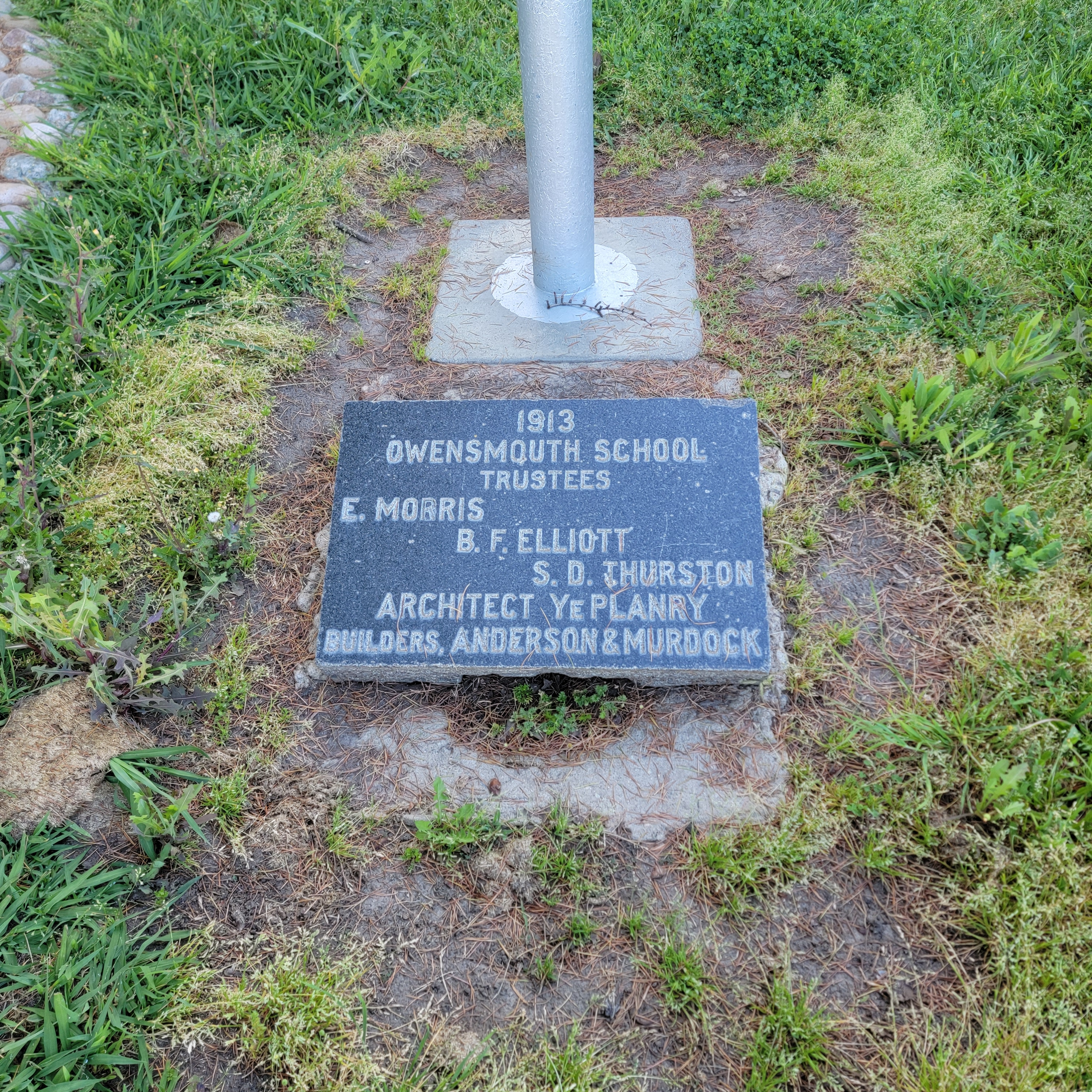
A plaque commemorating the 1913 Owensmouth School Trustees. Today, the school has been renamed to Canoga Park Elementary School.

The new town had its problems, not till 1913 did electricity get installed. In 1916 there were only 200 residents. The town and orchards did not get any aqueduct water till 1917, when the City of Los Angeles annexed Owensmouth. The street, Owensmouth Avenue that runs north-south through the valley, is one of the few reminders of the 1910s.

- The community's name was changed to Canoga Park in 1931.
- Current West Hills, Los Angeles, was part of Owensmouth from 1912 to 1931. In 1987 West Hills was formed from a part of Canoga Park, creating a new community.
- Owensmouth Ave, a street running north and south through the San Fernando Valley just east of Topanga Canyon Blvd, from just south of the Ronald Reagan (118) Freeway to just north of the Ventura (101) Freeway.

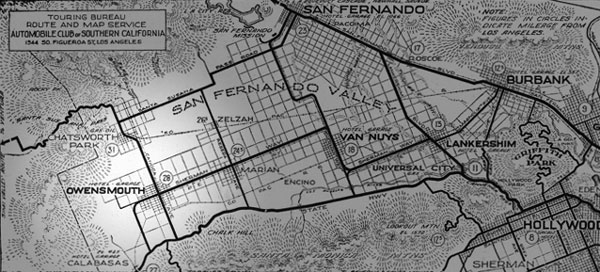
1917 map of the San Fernando Valley by the Automobile Club of Southern California, showing the town of Owensmouth in the current location of Canoga Park and West Hills

- Owensmouth Line Street car line to Owensmouth ran from 1911 to 1952.
- San Fernando Line Street car line to Owensmouth (1911 to 1952). Built by Moses Sherman's Los Angeles Pacific Railroad sold to PE.
- Owensmouth Southern Pacific Railroad line and station opened in 1912. The 1912 station was at 21355 Sherman Way, Canoga Park. The station was damaged by fire in 1995 and demolished.

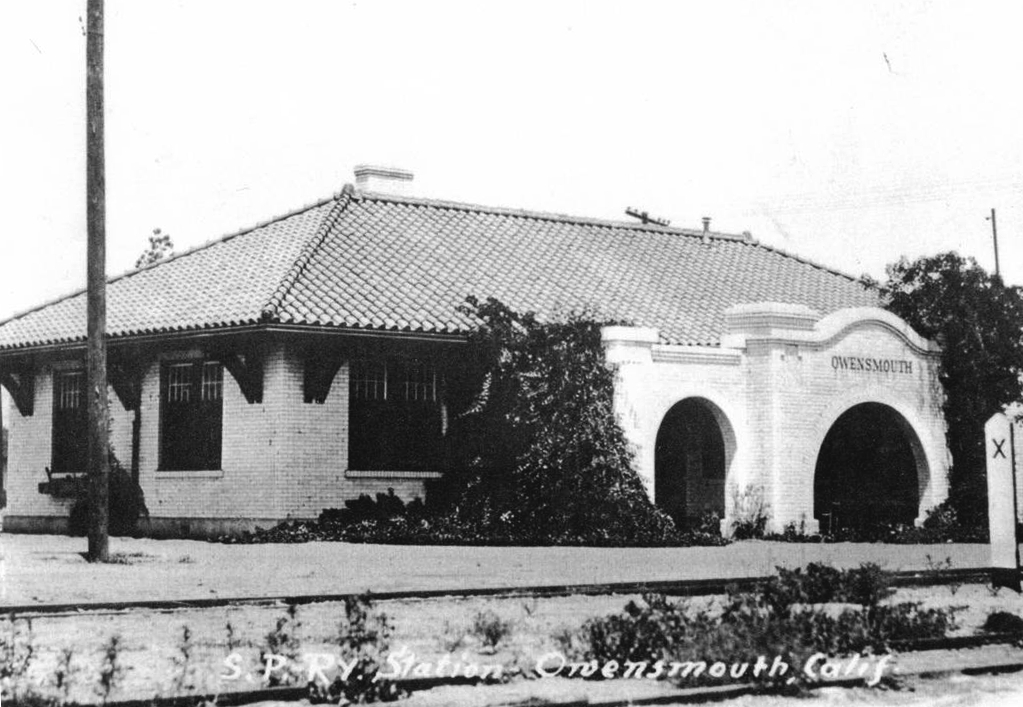
Southern Pacific Railroad Owensmout Depot 1915

- Part of the old Rancho El Escorpión was in Owensmouth. It was the original Mexican land grant.

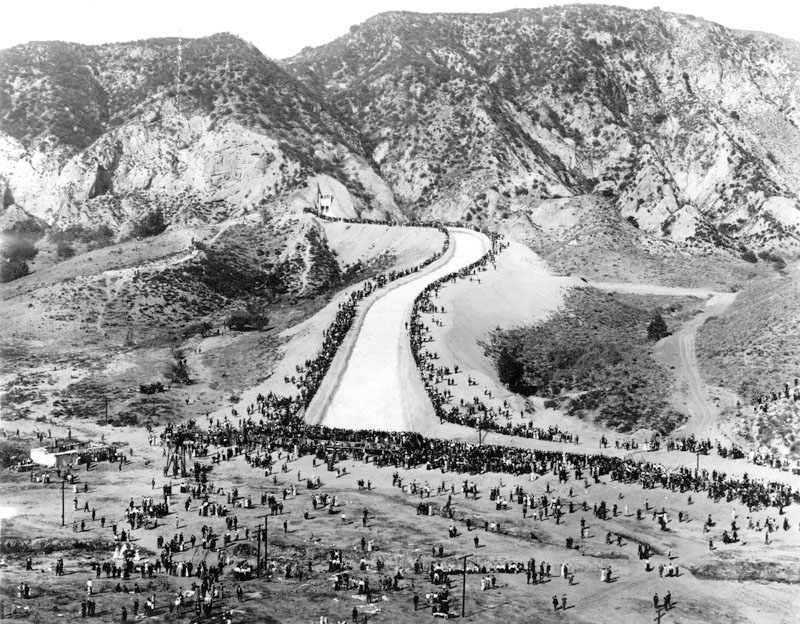
Los Angeles Aqueduct. Spectators wait for the first water swelling down the open part of the aqueduct in 1913

- Los Angeles Suburban Homes Company was in Owensmouth. The company built homes, owned by Isaac Newton Van Nuys

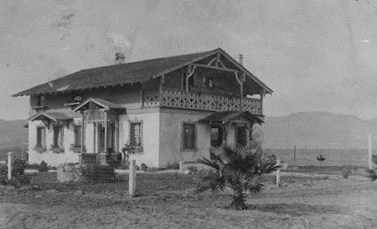
1912 photo of the Knapp home at Owensmouth Avenue and Cohasset Street in Owensmouth (now Canoga Park). View looking north west. Frank Joseph Knapp (1875–1952)

- State Bank of Owensmouth, was in Owensmouth. Its President was H.J. Whitley.
- Owensmouth High School in Canoga Park, California, opened October 4, 1914; it is now called Canoga Park High School, the oldest High School in the west San Fernando Valley.
- Owensmouth Continuation high school is in Canoga Park.

== See also ==
- State Water Project
- Warner Center station
- William Mulholland
- Glendale and Montrose Railway
- Bell Canyon Park
- Sherman Way station
- Canoga Park

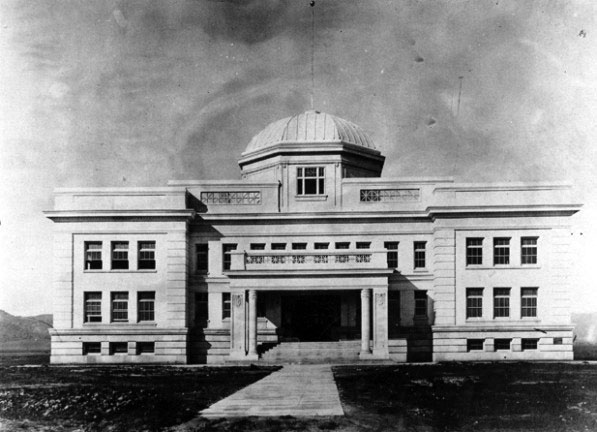
Owensmouth Elementary School 1915, The school faced south on Valerio Street, Topanga West and Chatsworth mountains behind are to the north.
