= Phoenix Street Railway =

Former streetcar service

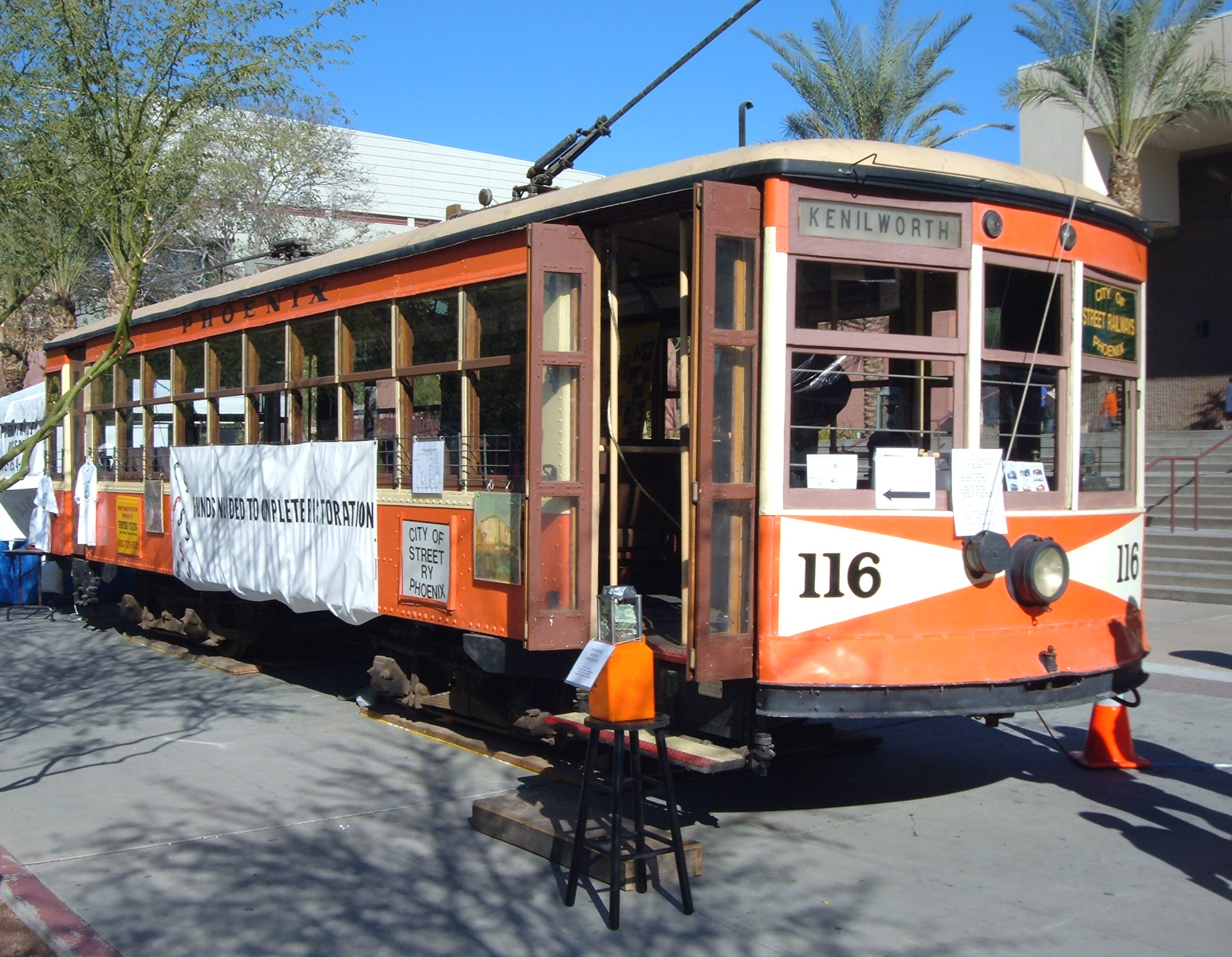
Historic Trolley Car #116. The restored 1928 trolley served the original Phoenix trolley system from 1928 to 1947.

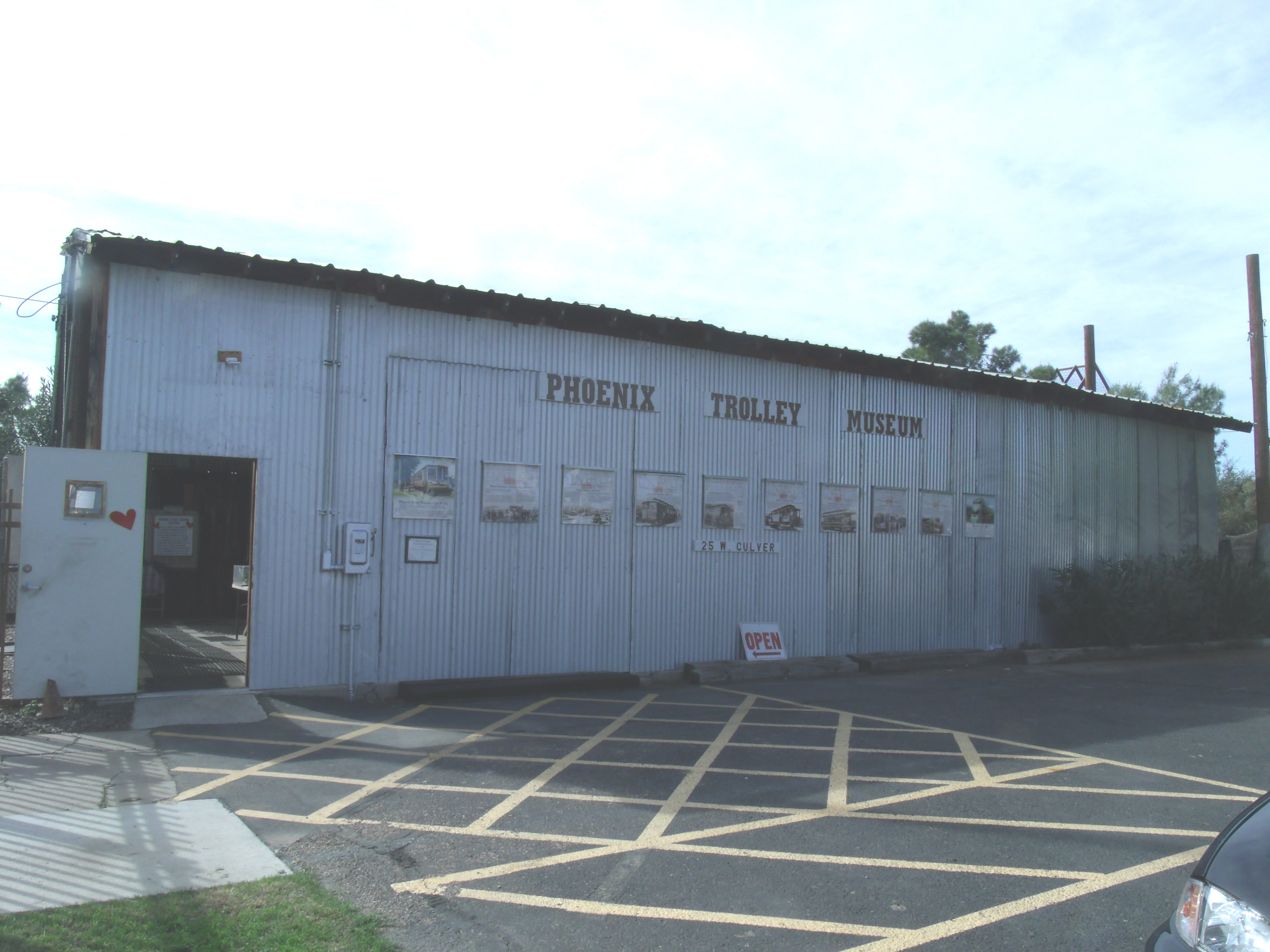
The Phoenix Trolley Museum, when it was located at 25 W. Culver St. The museum has since relocated to 1117 Grand Avenue. The main exhibit of the museum is trolley car #116.

The Phoenix Street Railway provided streetcar service in Phoenix, Arizona, United States, from 1888 to 1948. The motto was "Ride a Mile and Smile the While."

== History ==
The line was founded in 1887 by Moses Hazeltine Sherman and used horse-drawn cars. The system opened on January 11, 1888. Many of these lines were built to subdivisions that were being developed by Sherman's land development interests. Beginning in 1893, electric streetcars were slowly introduced to the system. All of the lines provided fully electric service by 1895, with the exception of the Grand Avenue Line which did not receive electric service until 1909. The service was popular with the locals and was partly responsible for the growth patterns observed in the early history of Phoenix. In 1911, the first of several planned interurban lines opened to Glendale; additional lines were planned but never built to Tempe, Mesa, and Scottsdale. The system reached its height in the 1920s with several line extensions. By 1925, there were 33.6 miles (54.1 km) of track on six lines. Line voltage was 550 Volts direct current.

A potential competitor, the Salt River Valley Electric Railway, in 1912 hired engineers to build lines east from downtown Phoenix to Mesa via Tempe and Scottsdale, and a Southside line, to run from Phoenix to Tempe on the south side of the Salt River. The Salt River company later announced its lines would "connect Phoenix, Scottsdale, Tempe, Mesa, Chandler, Alhambra, Glendale and Peoria." However, other than some digging on Van Buren and Monroe Streets, the line never managed to complete any construction, and was abandoned in 1914.

In 1925, the city of Phoenix purchased the Street Railway line. City operation saw faster speeds, increased frequency, and late-night "Owl" service, leading to increased ridership and profits even through the Depression. A fleet of new streetcars entered service Christmas Day 1928, although a few of the older cars continued to serve the Grand Avenue line. Streetcars were withdrawn from Grand Avenue in 1934. The Kenilworth line ceased service on April 16, 1947 as the city purchased more buses and as suburban growth surpassed the former city boundaries.

On October 3, 1947, a catastrophic fire destroyed most of the streetcar fleet. City officials faced the decision to either rebuild the fleet or use buses. Trolleybuses had previously been considered but the overhead system was found incompatible. Buses were ultimately chosen, and the streetcar system was abandoned in February 1948. The Phoenix area turned its focus to the automobile, suburbs, and highways; and until recently relied solely on buses for public transportation.

Three of the city-bought 1928 streetcars are being stored until the Phoenix Trolley Museum, on Grand Avenue, constructs a new trolley barn. A 1913 Phoenix car is in storage at Old Pueblo Trolley in Tucson, pending restoration.

Rail transit returned when Valley Metro Rail opened its modern light-rail system on December 28, 2008—nearly sixty years after the Street Railway's last run.

== Lines ==
After the 1930s, the four remaining lines were numbered.

Number	Line	Last service	Route
#1	Brill Line (10th Street Line)	April 28, 1946	Ran south on 10th Street from Sheridan to Pierce, west on Pierce, south on 4th Street, west on Washington Street, and terminated at 2nd Avenue station. Return trip traveled north from 2nd Avenue, east on Monroe, to 4th Street, and north via Pierce.
#2	Capitol / W. Adams - East Lake Park (Washington Street Line)	February 17, 1948	Ran east from 22nd Avenue, across the Santa Fe Railway tracks, to end of the line at 16th 1/2 Street.
#3	Kenilworth (5th Avenue Line)	April 16, 1947	Ran south from Encanto Blvd. along 5th Avenue, past the Kenilworth School, and terminated at 2nd Avenue station.
#4	Indian School (3rd Street Line)	August 15, 1947	Ran south from Indian School Road along 3rd Street, with double-track mainline as far as the loop at Monroe. Looped west at Washington and terminated at 2nd Avenue station. Return trip north and via Monroe back to right-hand track and north again on 3rd Street.
—	Grand Avenue	1934	North on 7th Avenue to Grand Avenue, then northwest to 19th Avenue. Fully single tracked.
—	Orangewood	c. 1930s	

== See also ==
- List of defunct Arizona railroads
- Phoenix Trolley Museum
- List of heritage railroads in the United States
- List of town tramway systems in the United States
- Valley Metro Rail & Streetcar
- Phoenix, Arizona public transport

== Further media ==
- "Ride a Mile and Smile the While" segment, KNXV-TV Channel 15, Noon News, 29 May 1998
- "Clang, Clang, Clang Went the Trolley," Arizona Highways magazine, June 1986, pp. 38–43.
