= Picover station =

Former railway station on the former Pacific Electric Owensmouth Line

Picover

General information
- Location: 16710 Sherman Way; Van Nuys, California
- Coordinates: 34°12′3.5″N 118°29′48.3″W
- Tracks: 1

History
- Opened: 1917
- Closed: 1938

Los Angeles Historic-Cultural Monument
- Designated: 1989
- Reference no.: 405

Picover was a railway station on the former Pacific Electric Owensmouth Line. Now destroyed, it was designated a Los Angeles Historic-Cultural Monument. The name is of unknown origin.

== History ==
Originally constructed for the community of Marian (later Reseda) in 1914, the station was moved to Sherman Way between Balboa Boulevard and Hayvenhurst Avenue in 1917. Still in what was a rural farming community at the time, a new vegetable packing building was constructed adjacent to the main depot in 1932. When the Pacific Electric service in the San Fernando Valley was truncated to Van Nuys in 1938, the station was moved to its last location adjacent to Bull Creek. PE received authorization to abandon the station in January 1951.

By the 1980s the building had been sold and was being used as an antique mall. It was made a Los Angeles Historic-Cultural Monument in January 1989. The building was destroyed in a fire in June 1990.

== See also ==
- List of Los Angeles Historic-Cultural Monuments in the San Fernando Valley
