= Phoenix Trolley Museum =

Coordinates: 33°27′20″N 112°05′16″W

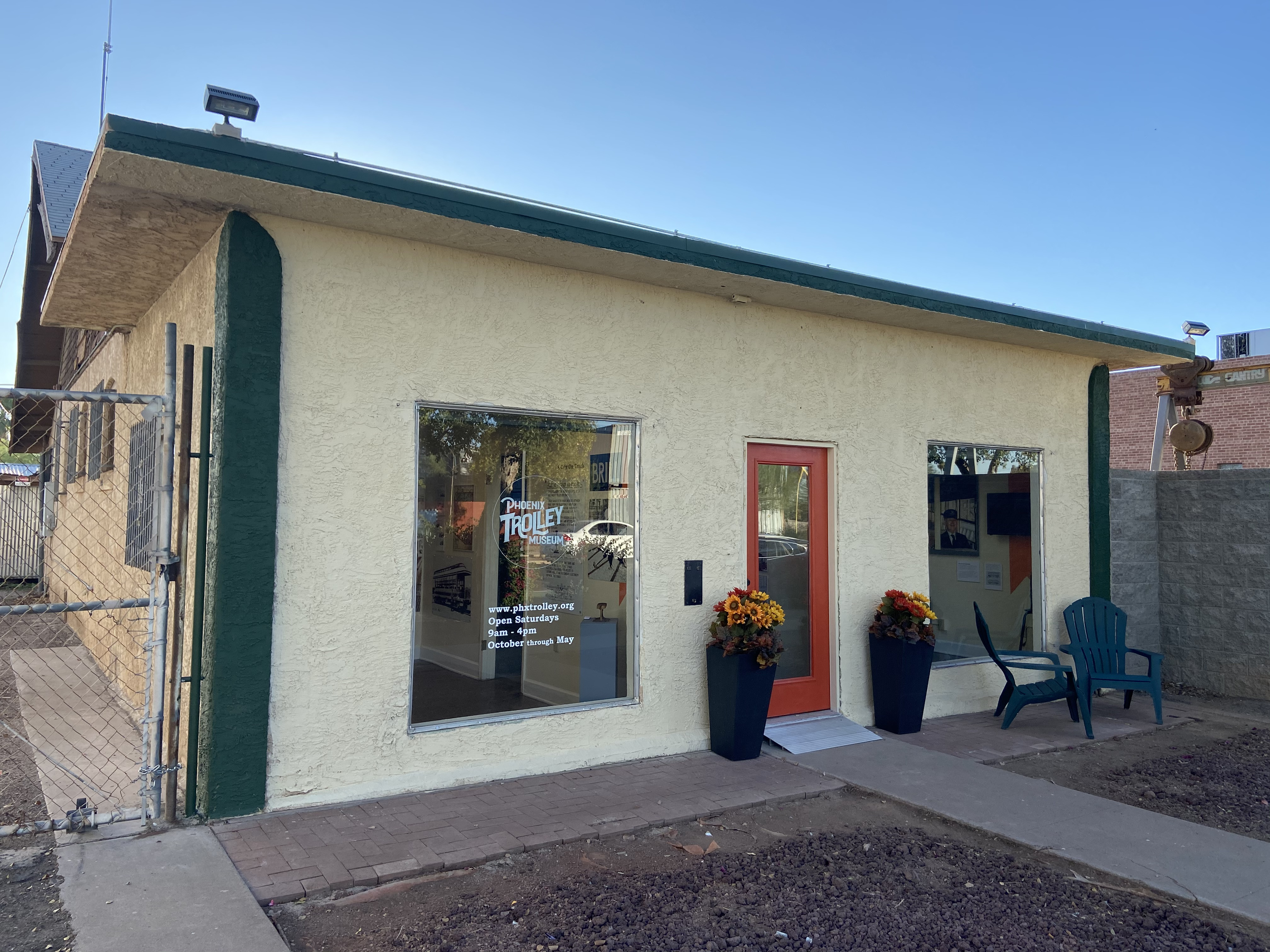
- Phoenix Trolley Museum
- Established: 1975
- Location: 1117 Grand Avenue, Phoenix, Arizona, United States
- Type: Railway museum
- Website: http://phxtrolley.org

The Phoenix Trolley Museum, incorporated as the Arizona Street Railway Museum, is a railway museum established in 1975, with an emphasis on preserving historical street cars in Phoenix, Arizona, US. The museum is "dedicated to the preservation of original Phoenix trolley cars and memorabilia, and to showing their place in the history of America's fifth largest city."

== Overview ==
The museum was located next to the Margaret Hance Deck Park on Interstate 10 in downtown Phoenix until December 2017. In 2016, the City of Phoenix declined to renew the museum's lease for another five-year period, and the Hance Park location was closed.

In 2018, the museum relocated to a site in Phoenix's historic Grand Avenue Arts and Small Business district, along one of the earliest trolley lines in the city. The museum's volunteer board of directors is developing plans to renovate the existing vintage structure to house exhibits and offices, and to construct a new facility to house and refurbish trolleys under their stewardship. It is now raising the funds to do so.

In 2019, the Phoenix Trolley Museum's board of directors and volunteers organized a "spruce up campaign" to improve the building's exterior and interior exhibit spaces, including a significant overhaul of its exhibits.

After a successful fund-raising campaign in 2020, the museum was able to purchase the Grand Avenue property it has been occupying since 2018.

== Discovery of Car 509 ==
In 2020, local businessman Mike Bystrom donated Phoenix streetcar No. 509 to the museum. The founders of the museum had been interested in finding the extant Phoenix streetcars after the service was discontinued in February 1948 and the city sold the seven remaining cars, but had suspected that No. 509 was lost in a trolley car barn fire in 1948 that destroyed seven and badly damaged another.

== Museum features ==
- Restored Phoenix Street Railway Streetcar #116 is in storage.
- Phoenix Street Railway Car #504 (originally #108) is unrestored and is in storage.
- Phoenix Street Railway Car #509 was donated to the Phoenix Trolley Museum in December 2020. It is unrestored and on display.
- An electric calcine locomotive donated by the (then) Phelps-Dodge Corporation from its Douglas, AZ facility is on display.
- Photographs, maps, and numerous items of historical interest are on display in the museum.

== Museum gallery ==
Phoenix Trolley Museum
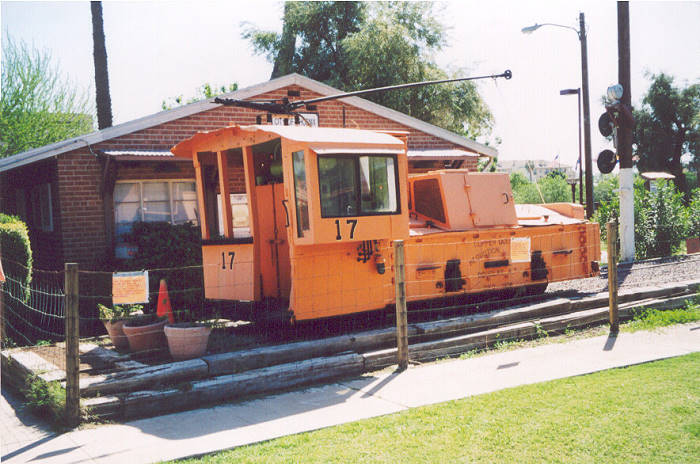
Phelps-Dodge locomotive 17 sits on display at the former location of the Phoenix Trolley Museum.

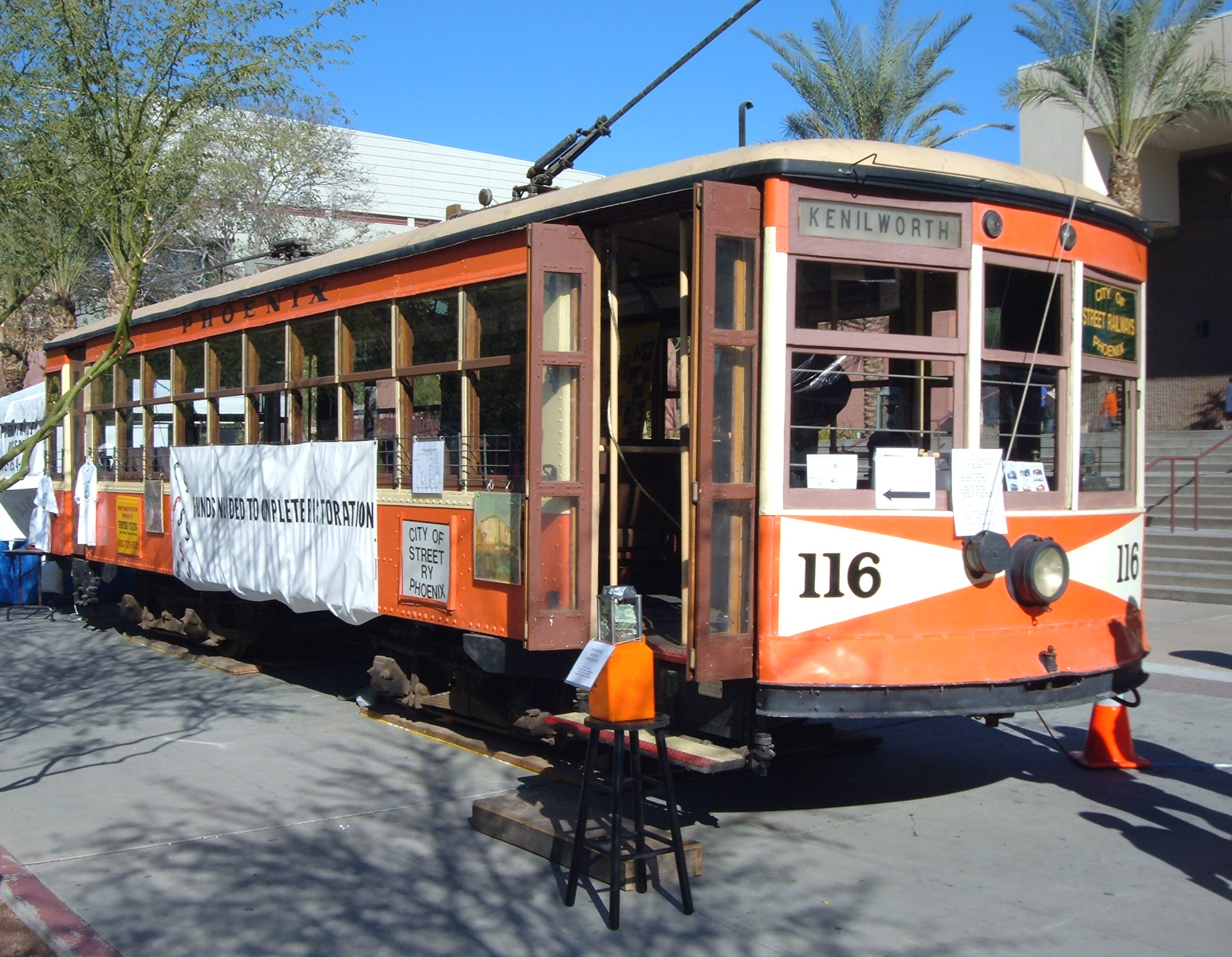
Phoenix Streetcar #116 as displayed during the grand opening of Valley Metro Rail on December 27, 2008.

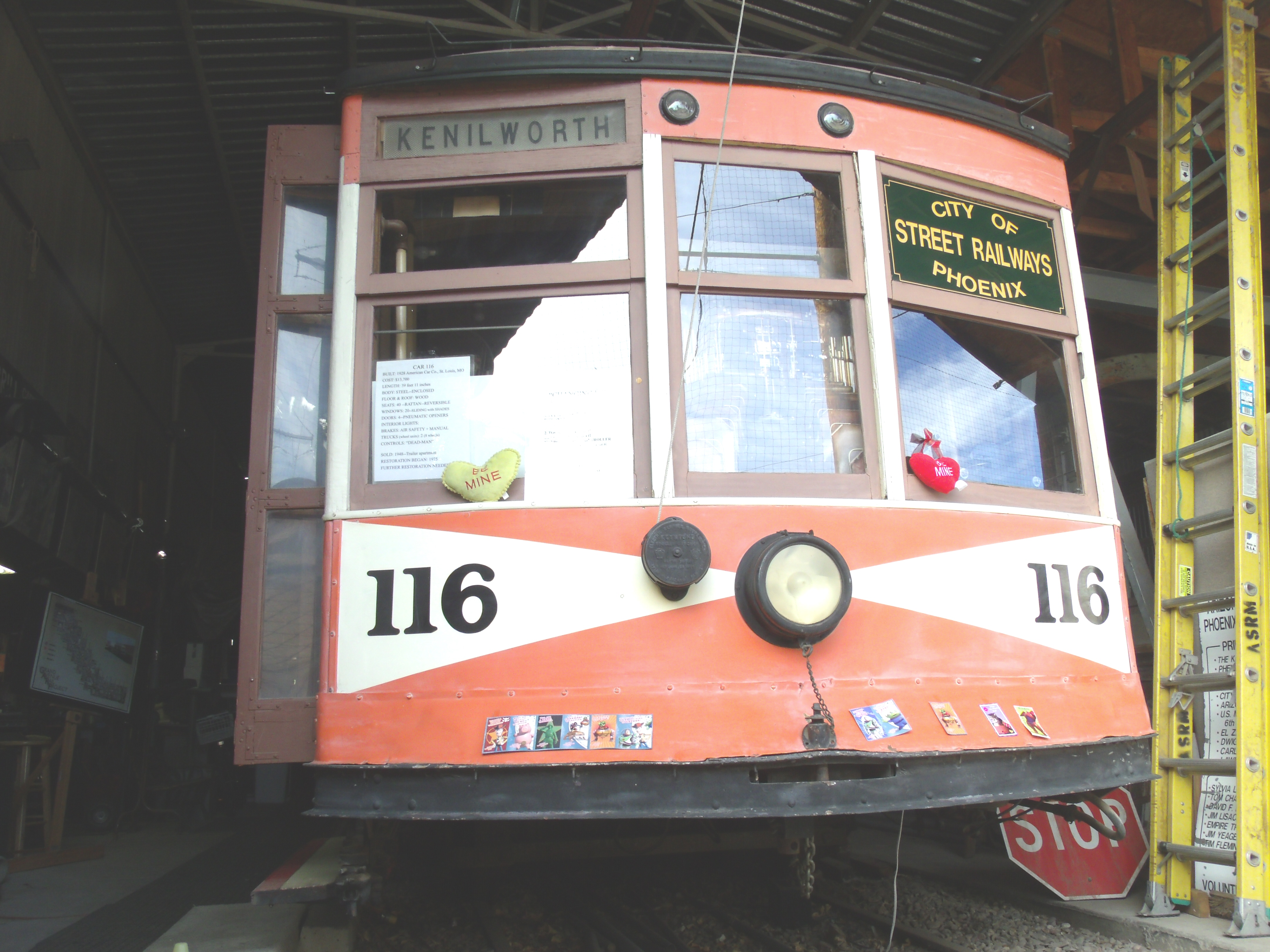
The 1928 Trolley Car #116 served the original Phoenix trolley system from 1928 to 1947.

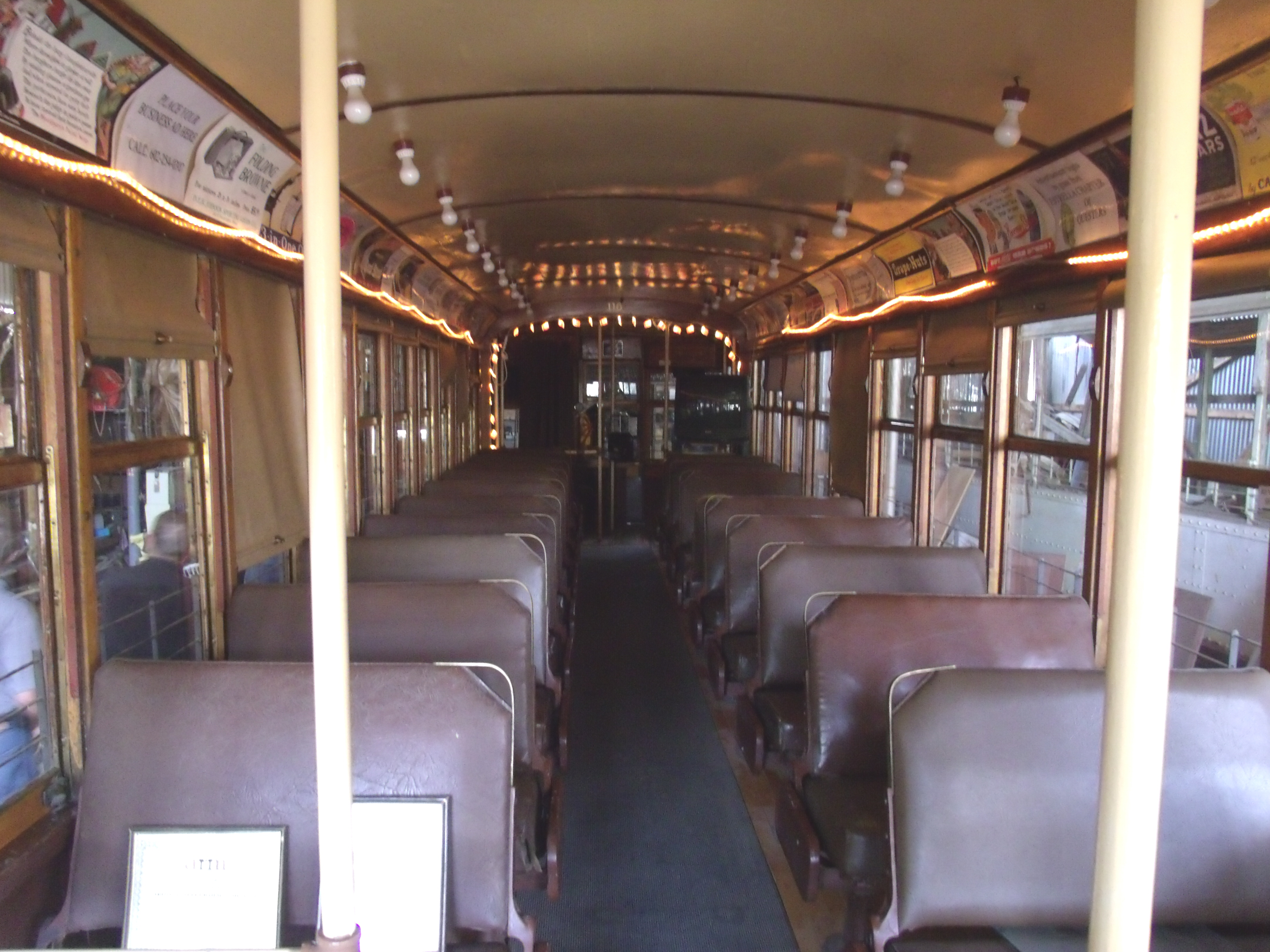
Inside the historic #116.

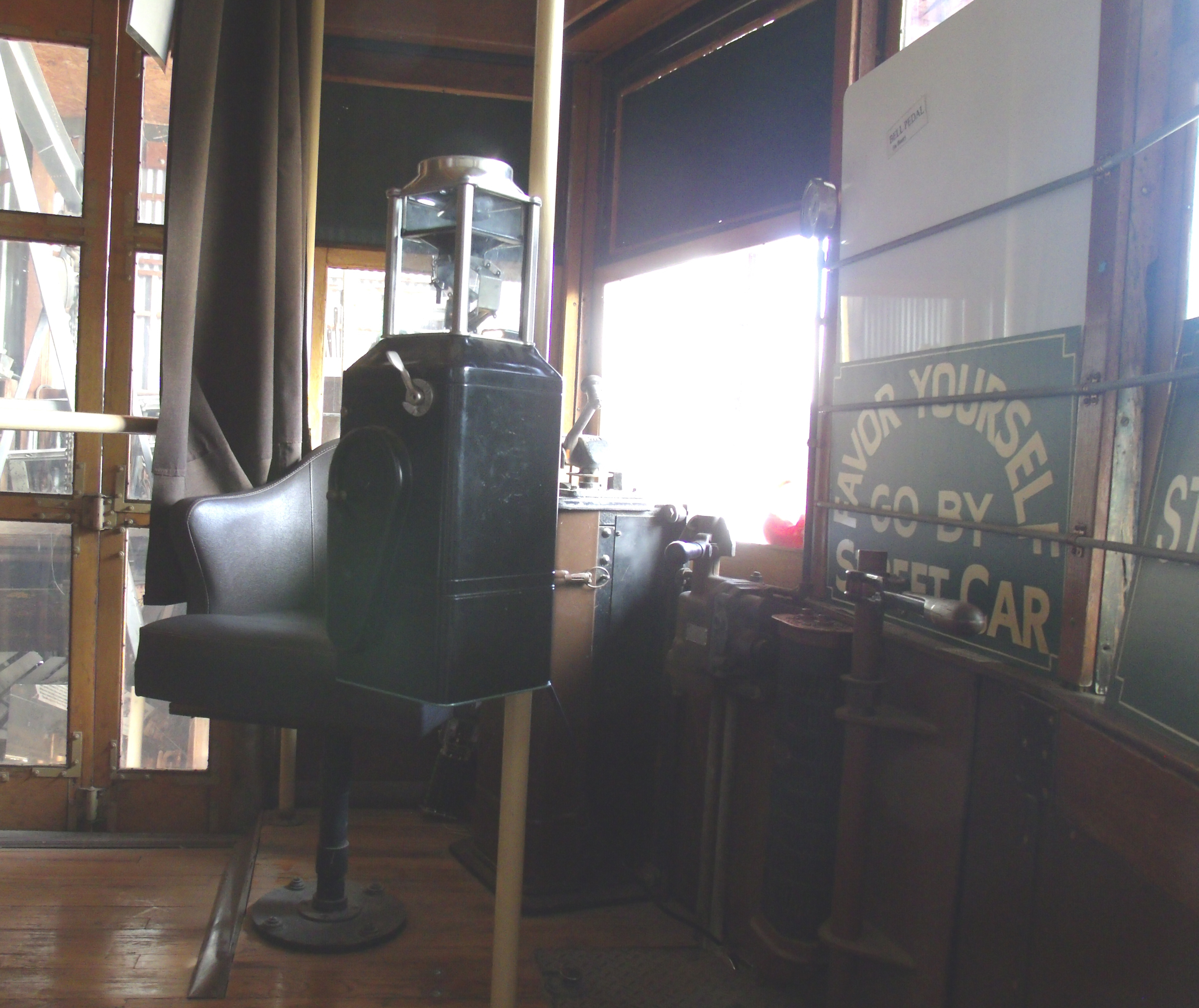
Front inside view of the Trolley Car #116. Pictured is a restored farebox.

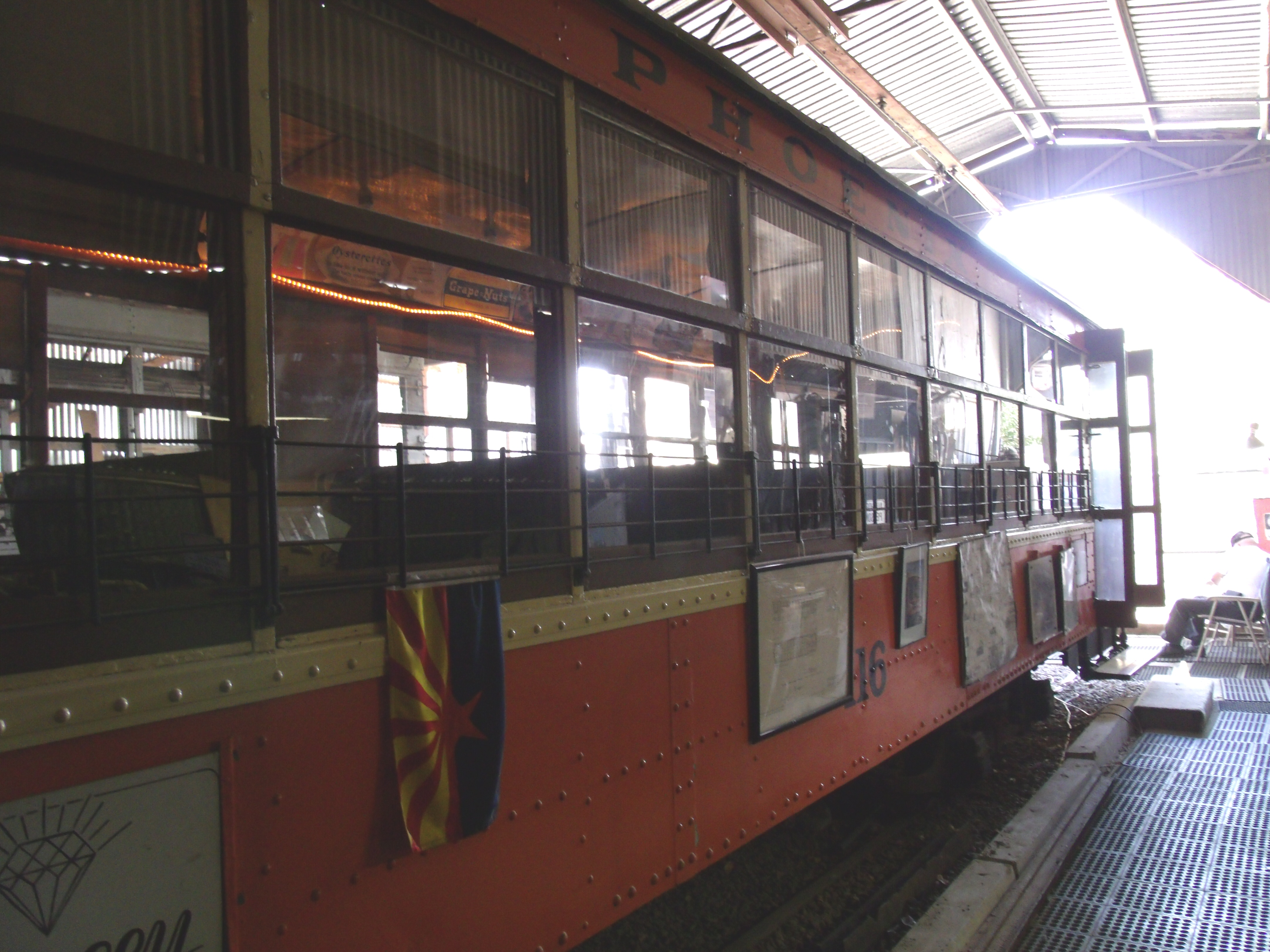
Different view of Trolley Car #116.

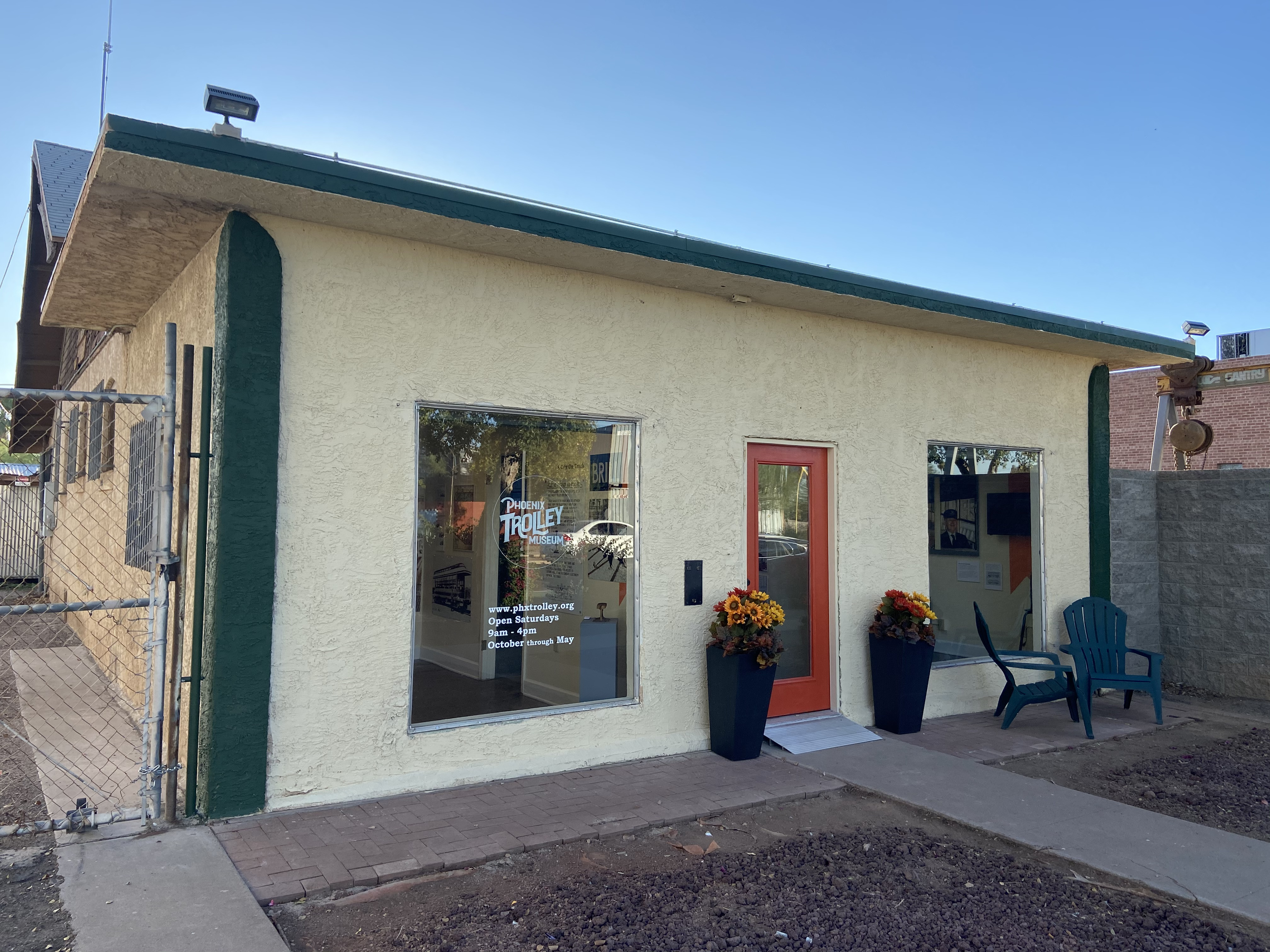
Museum exterior after the 2019 "spruce up campaign".

== See also ==
- List of heritage railroads in the United States
- Phoenix Street Railway
