= Sherman Library and Gardens =

Botanical gardens in California, US

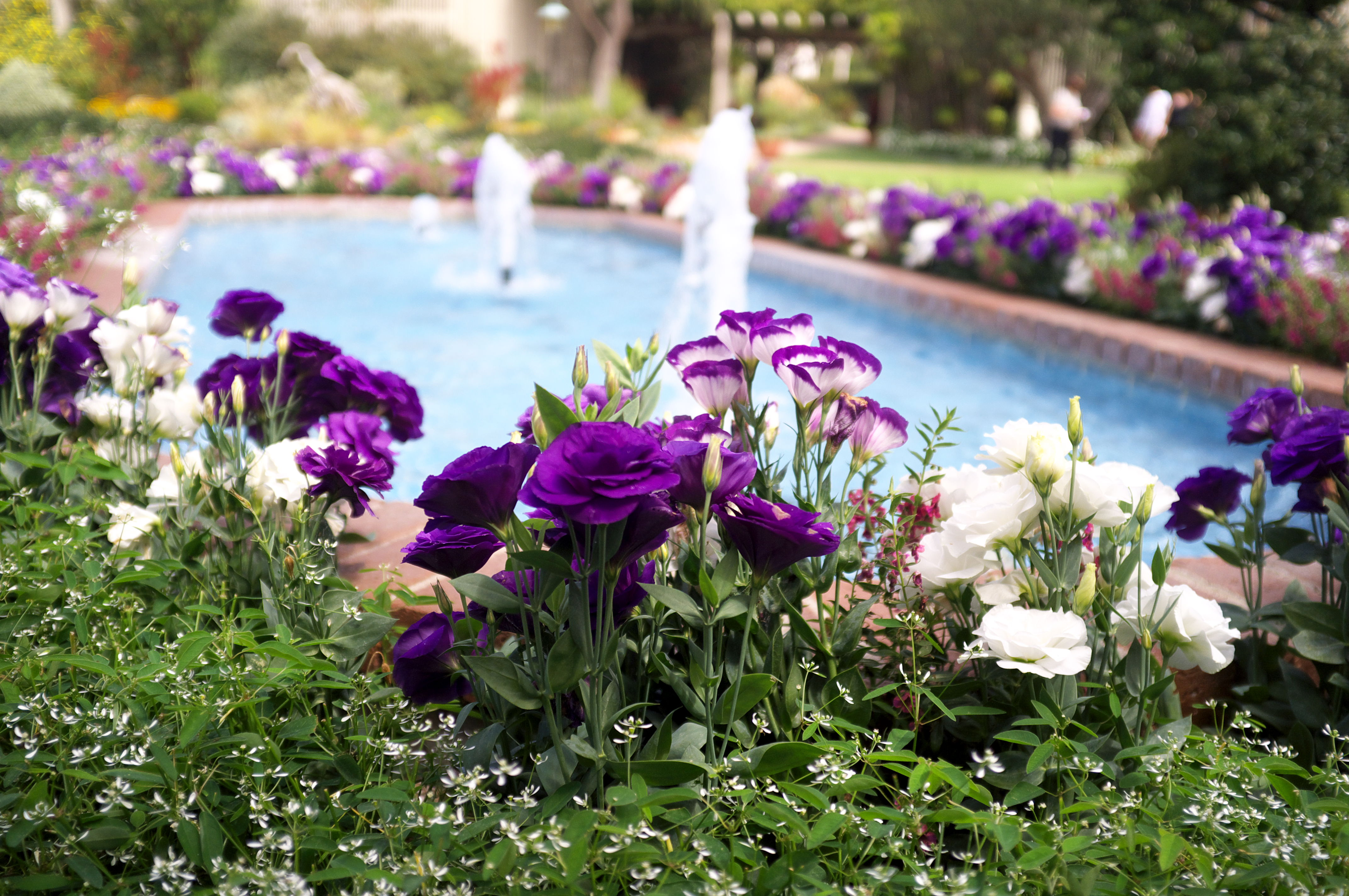
- Flowers in front of a fountain at the gardens

- Location within southern California
- Type: Botanical garden
- Location: 2647 East Coast Highway; Corona del Mar, California, United States
- Coordinates: 33°36′09″N 117°52′24″W
- Area: 2.2 acres (0.89 ha)
- Opened: 1955; 71 years ago
- Website: thesherman.org

The Sherman Library and Gardens are botanical gardens in Corona del Mar, California. The gardens are open to the public daily except Thanksgiving Day, Christmas Day and New Year's Day. An admission fee is charged. Today's garden began in 1955 when Arnold D. Haskell bought the Norman's Nursery property. Haskell named the Library and Gardens after his mentor and benefactor M. H. Sherman.

The gardens include patios and conservatories, seasonal flower beds, and fountains. Collections range from desert plants to tropical vegetation. The Succulent Garden includes a California pepper tree. A tropical conservatory at the site features orchids, heliconias, and gingers. The Fern Grotto exhibits mature staghorn ferns, and the Herb Garden shows a variety of herbs, including chocolate and orange-mint, tri-color and society garlic.

== Gallery ==
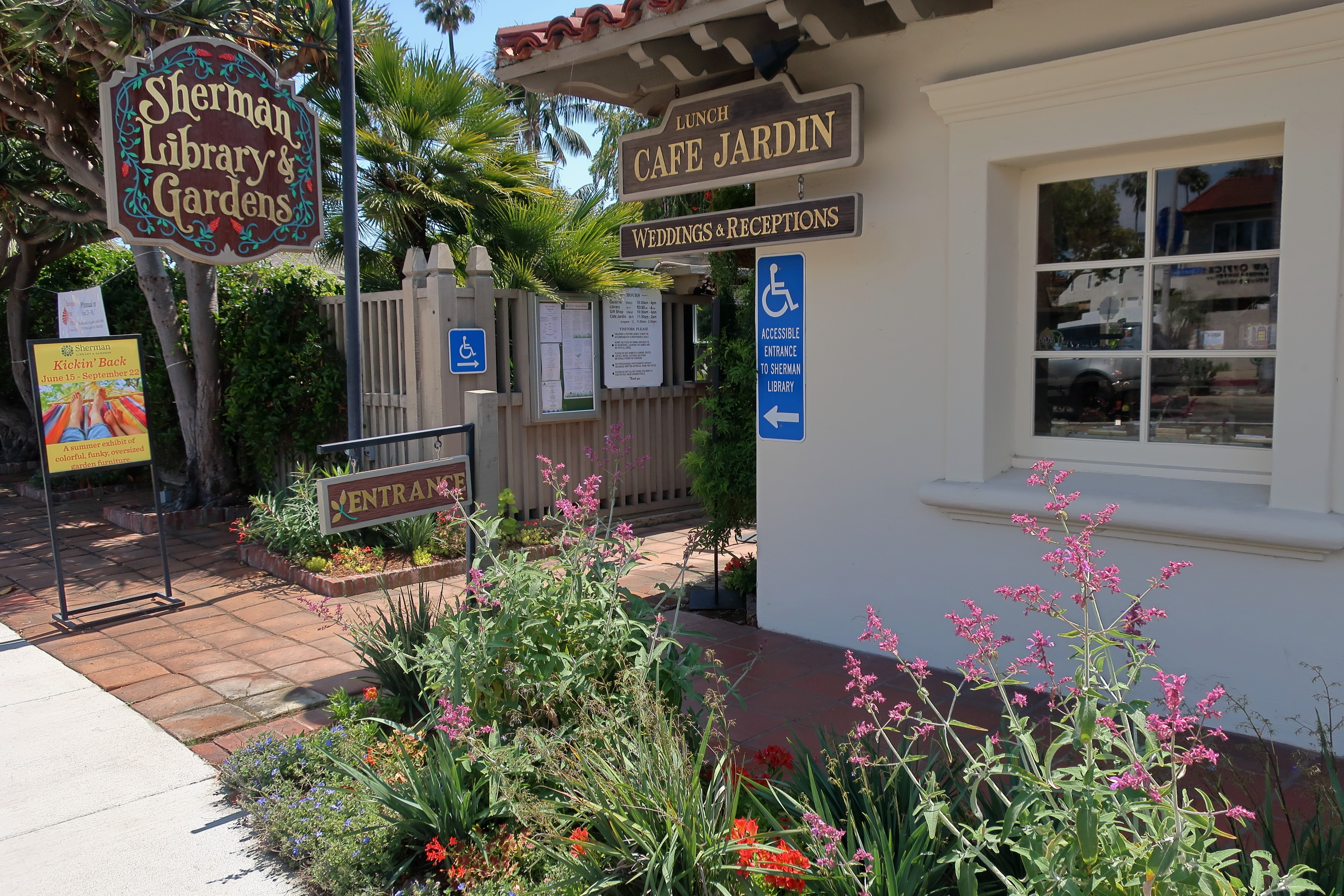
Entrance

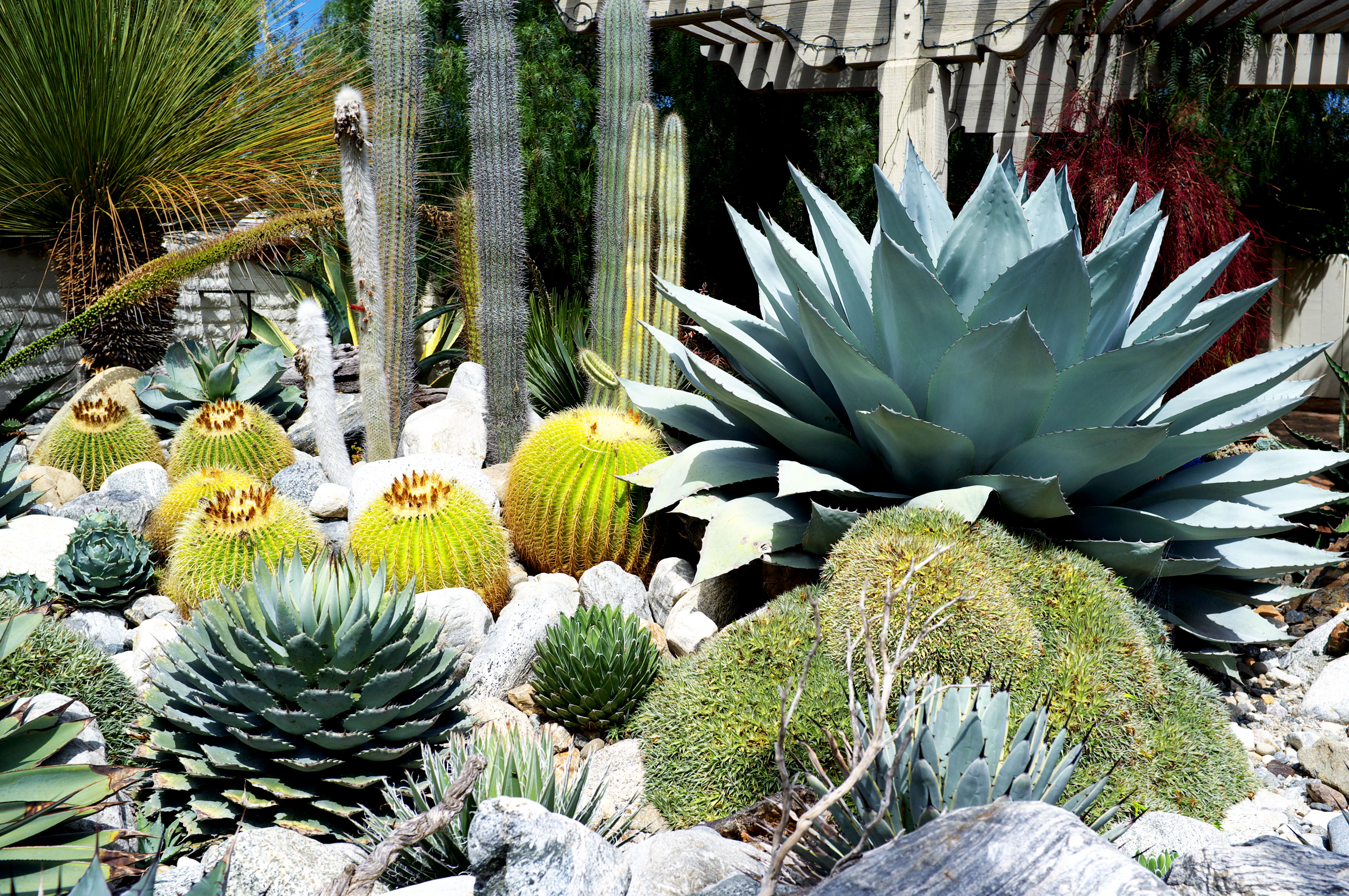
Cactus and succulent garden.

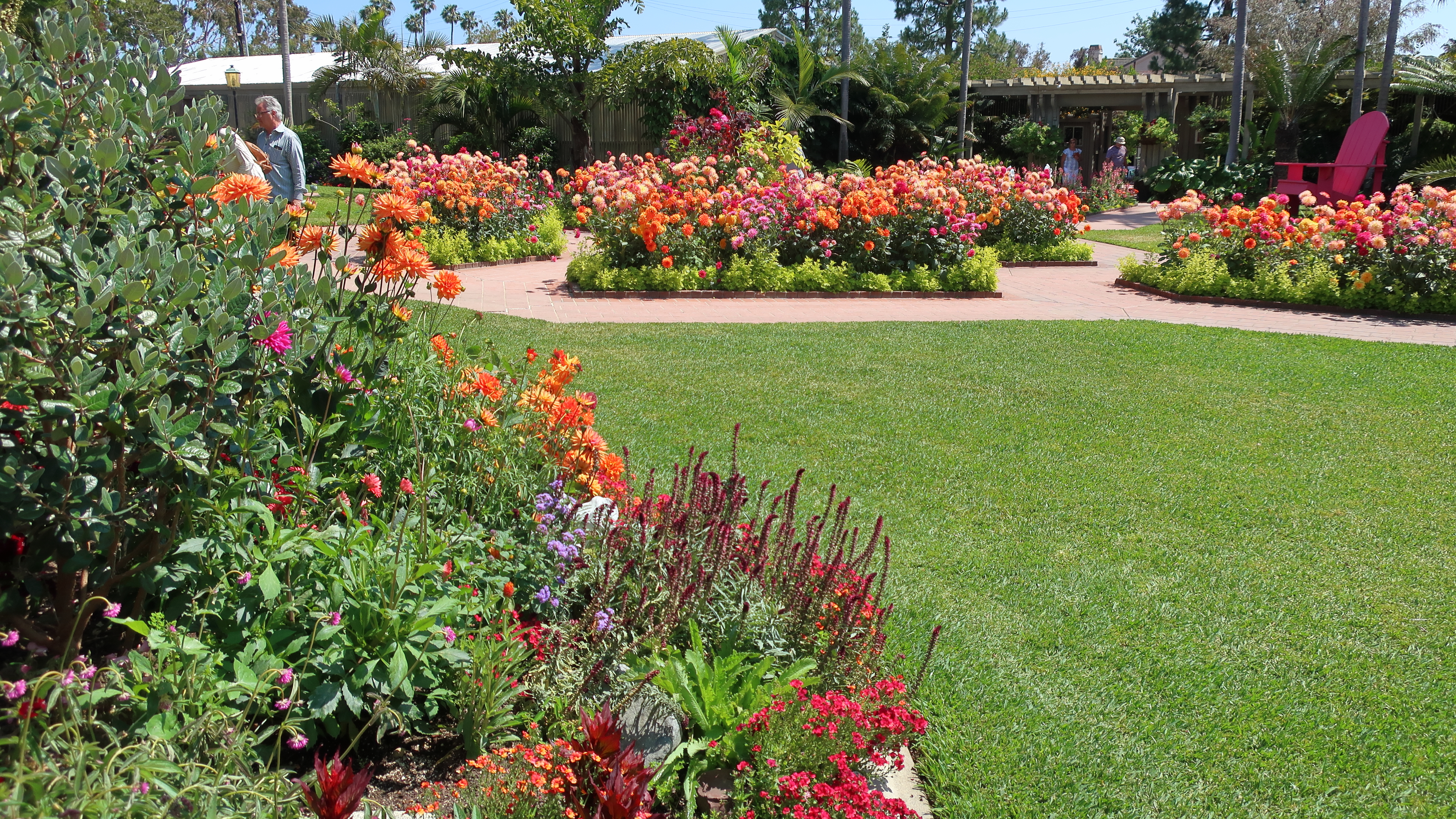

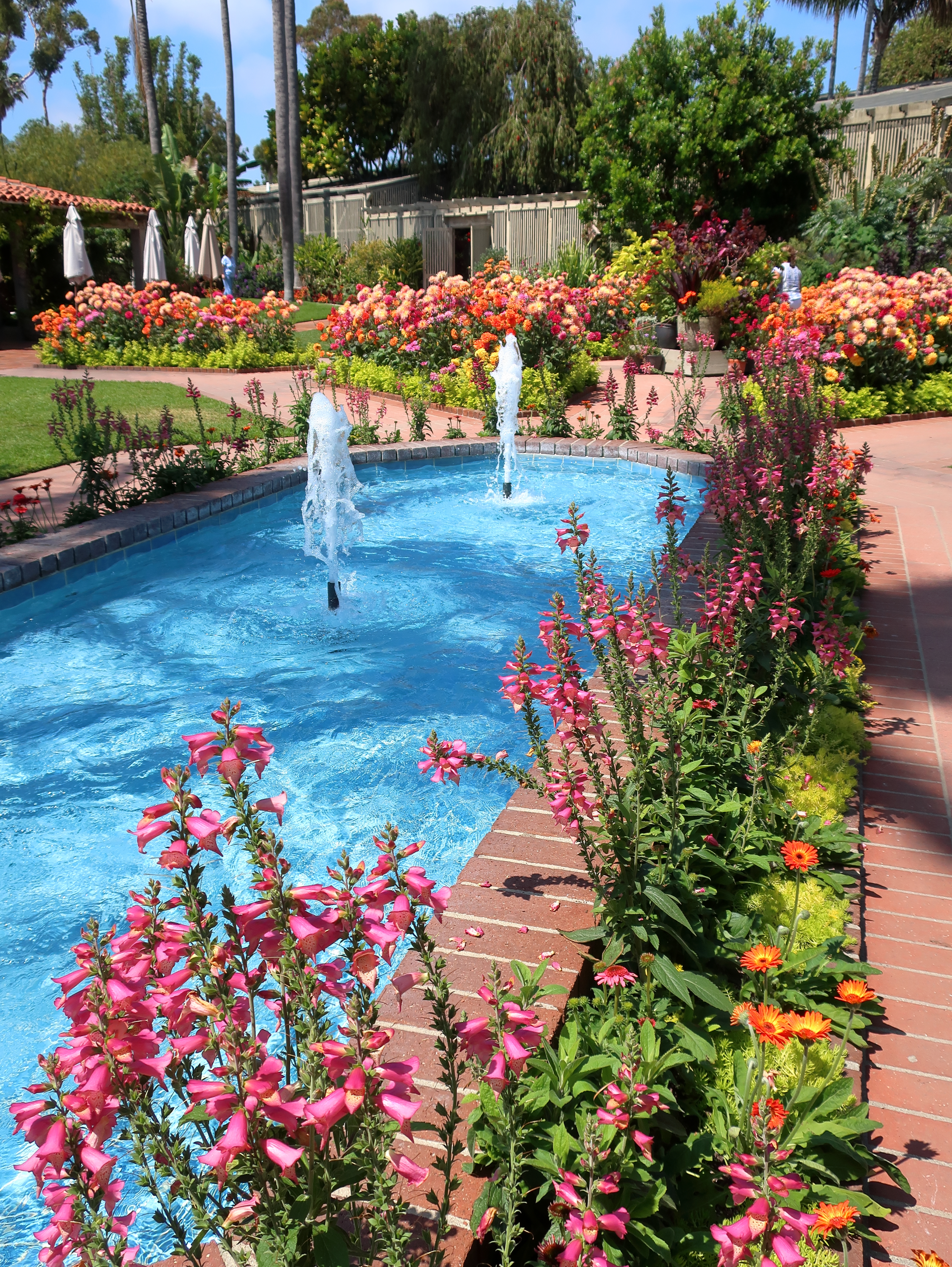

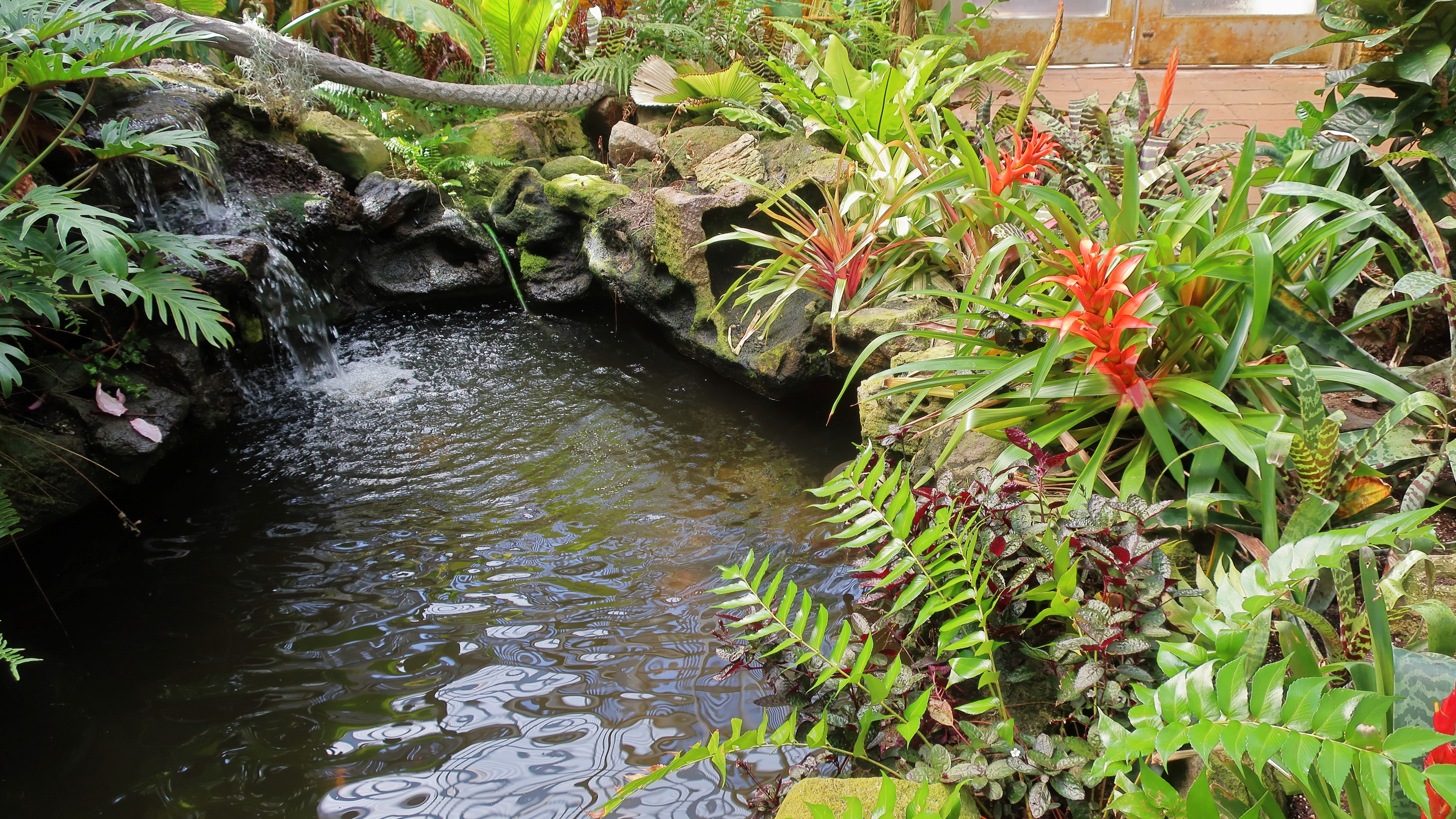

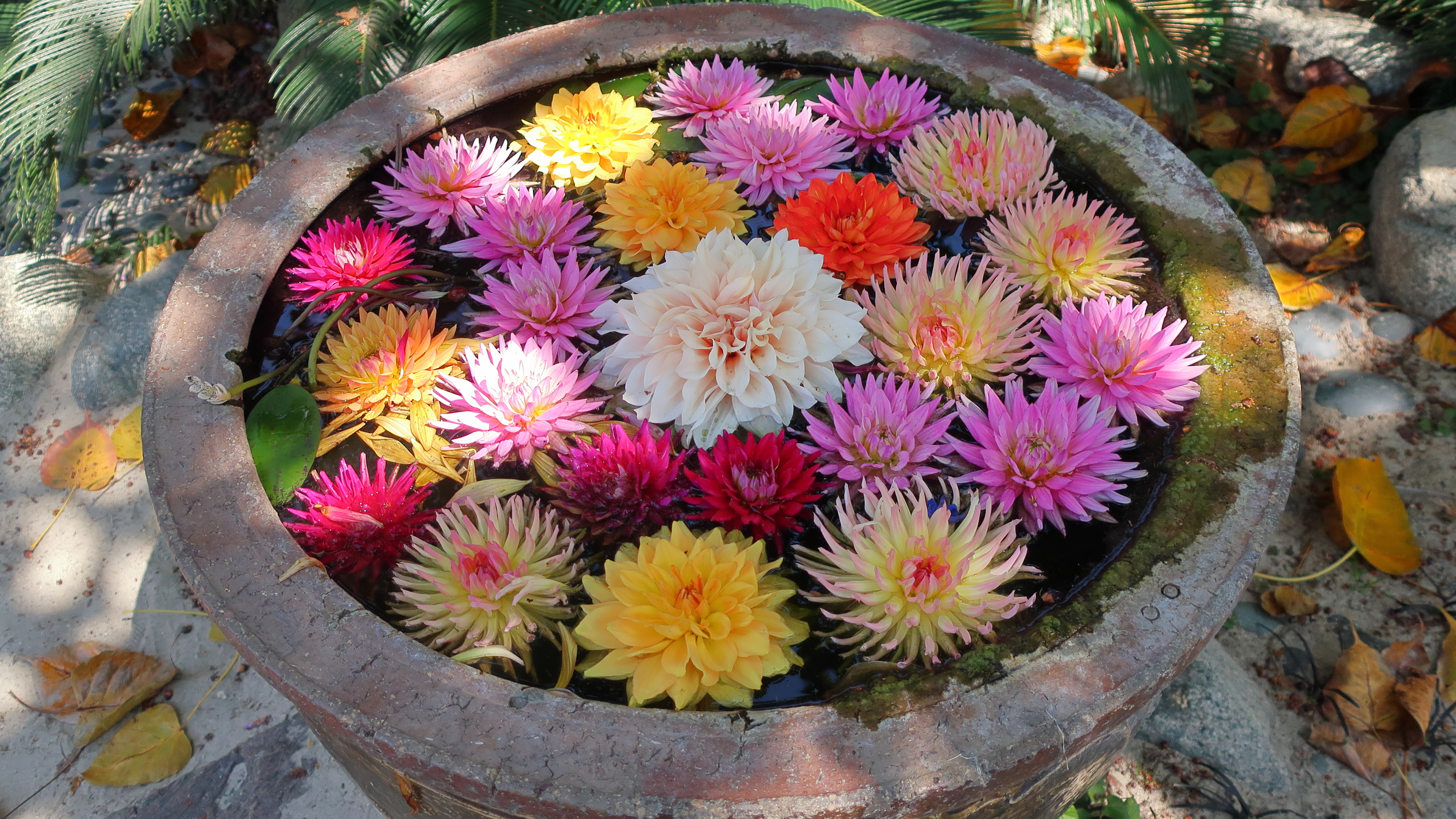

== See also ==
- List of botanical gardens in the United States
