= H. J. Whitley =

American businessman and land developer

Hobart Johnstone Whitley
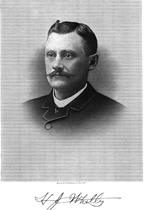
- Born: October 7, 1847; Toronto, Canada West
- Died: June 3, 1931 (aged 83); Los Angeles, California
- Burial place: Hollywood Memorial Cemetery
- Education: Toronto Business College
- Known for: Land development in California
- Spouse: Margaret Virginia Whitley
- Parent(s): Joseph Whitley; Eleanor Johnstone

Hobart Johnstone Whitley (October 7, 1847 – June 3, 1931) was a Canadian-American businessman and real estate developer. Whitley is best known for helping create the Hollywood subdivision in Los Angeles. He is among those known as the "Father of Hollywood."

== Early life ==
Whitley was born in Toronto, the seventh and youngest son of Joseph Whitley and Eleanor Johnstone. He grew up in Flint, Michigan, and attended Toronto Business College. Whitley became a naturalized citizen of the United States in the 1870s.

In 1887, Whitley married his second wife, Margaret Virginia Ross.

== Early career ==
Whitley moved to Chicago, where he owned a hardware store and candy store. He became interested in land development, became a land agent for the Rock Island Railroad and was elected to its board of directors. He plotted and organized towns in the Cherokee Strip region of Oklahoma, and in 1912 he "declined the first governorship."

== California ==
=== Hollywood ===
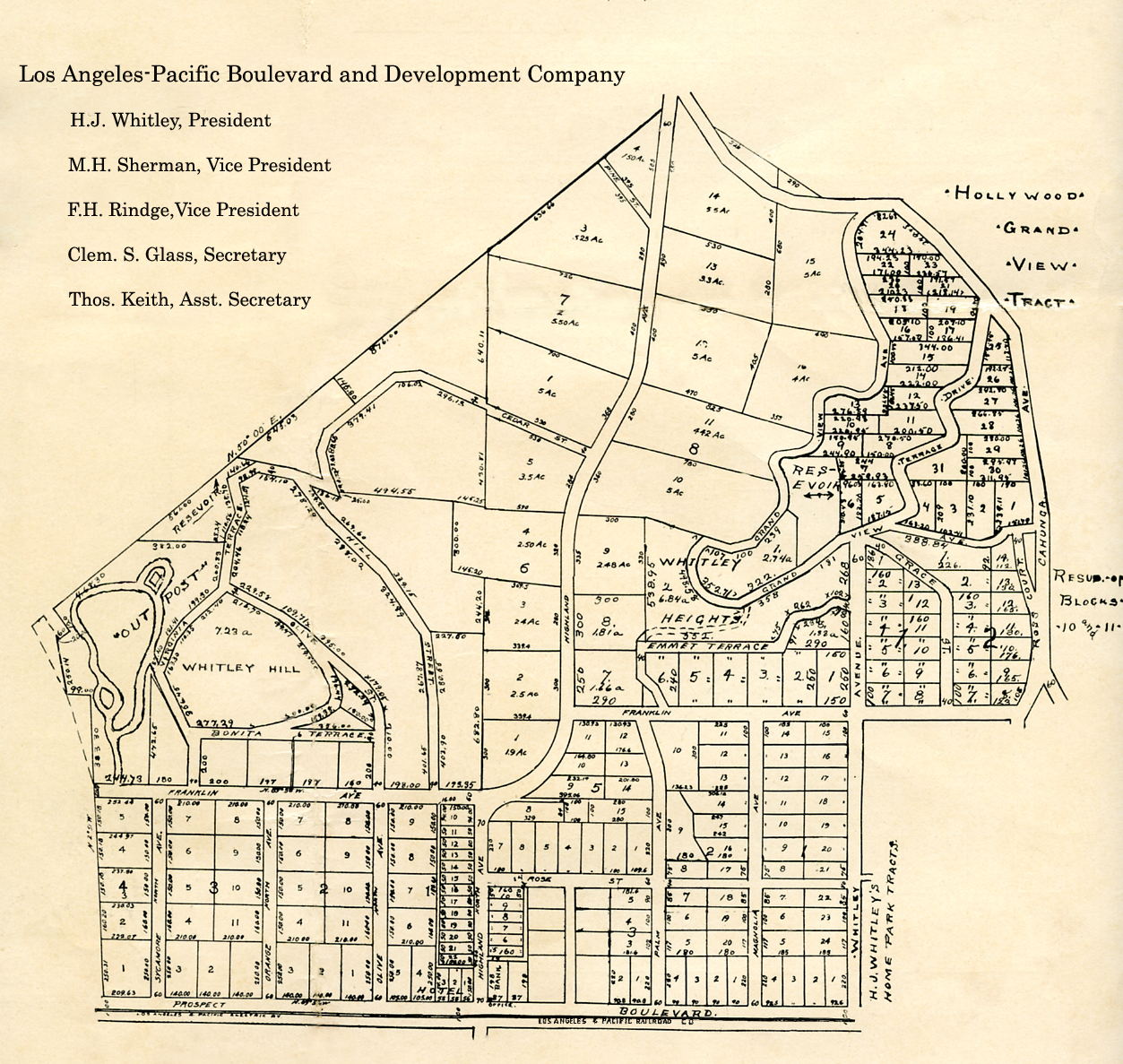
Original 480-acre map of H J Whitley's property developed by his company, Los Angeles Pacific Boulevard and Development Company. Highland Avenue runs through the center of the property. The square at the lower right hand corner is the Whitley estate.

Whitley came to California in 1893; the next year, 1894, he established the HJ Whitley Jewelry Store in Los Angeles.

Hollywood was then a rural settlement of eighteen families; Whitley envisioned Hollywood "as a thriving suburb of Los Angeles." He subdivided 400 acres of open fields and gardens into a residential section, and more families came here to live."

Whitley became a major shareholder, with Harrison Gray Otis and George W. Hoover, of the Los Angeles Pacific Boulevard and Development Company. He orchestrated the opening of the Ocean View Tract and construction of a bank on the corner of Hollywood Boulevard and Highland.

Whitely built the Hollywood Hotel on the same Hollywood and Highland corner, with George W. Hoover as builder. Construction was completed in February 1903.

The neighborhood of Whitley Heights in the Hollywood Hills originated as a residential housing development financed by Whitley.

Whitley, along with Charles E. Toberman, has been called "The Father of Hollywood." The first reference to Whitley by that title was in 1905.

=== Corcoran, California ===
Whitley took the lead in building the city of Corcoran, California. He purchased over 3,000 acres (12 km^{2}) to start the development, and was able to control the town's development through an interlocking set of companies that he controlled.

=== Whitley Gardens, California ===
Whitley's last development was never finished. He bought thousands of acres and started the town of Whitley Gardens. It is about ten miles (16 km) east of Paso Robles, California. Around 1924, as Los Angeles Times columnist Lee Shippey put it:

Whitley became a Paso Robles enthusiast, after the waters had given him new strength. He bought 48,000 acres of ranch lands there and dreams of putting through one more great development project. He can't understand how fine fertile land with water on it, on a state highway and within reach of ocean winds can still be bought for around $50 an acre.

It was said that Whitley had amassed "a private fortune running into the millions" but "most of this wealth dwindled in [this] one unfortunate investment at Paso Robles."

=== Other projects ===
In 1905, he and others began the development of 47,000 acres of land in the San Joaquin Valley and 50,000 acres in the San Fernando Valley.

In 1909 he formed the Suburban Homes Company, a syndicate, along with Harry Chandler, H. G. Otis, M. H. Sherman and O. F. Brandt. Henry E. Huntington extended his Pacific Electric Railway (Red Cars) through the Valley to Owensmouth (now Canoga Park). The Suburban Home Company laid out plans for roads and the towns of Van Nuys, Reseda (Marian) and Canoga Park (Owensmouth). The rural areas were annexed into the city of Los Angeles in 1915.

From about 1920 until his death, his company Whiltley Oil and Refining engaged in oil drilling in California.

== Death ==
Whitley died on June 3, 1931, at the Whitley Park Country Club on Ventura Boulevard near Van Nuys. He was buried in the Hollywood Memorial Park Cemetery, today named Hollywood Forever Cemetery. On his crypt is inscribed "The Father of Hollywood".

He was survived by his wife, a son and a daughter.

== Legacy ==
It is estimated that Whitley founded more than 140 towns in his lifetime.

The Hollywood Citizen said of him after his death: "He is remembered by the affectionate title which his community long ago bestowed upon him, the 'Father of Hollywood.'"

He was identified with the founding of Home Savings Bank, the First National Bank of Hollywood, the First National Bank of Van Nuys, and the State Banks of Owensmouth (Canoga Park), Reseda, and Corcoran.

Whitley donated large parcels of land and money for civic use. The donations were used to finance public schools, libraries, parks, landscaping, streets, transportation, lighting and churches.

At the time of his death, he was practically insolvent, having lost heavily in real estate developments.

Streets named after Whitley include:

- Hobart Blvd
- Whitley Heights, Los Angeles - a residential neighborhood, historic preservation overlay zone in the Hollywood Hills neighborhood of Los Angeles, CA.
- Whitley Avenue, Los Angeles - a north–south street, begins on Hollywood Blvd. in Hollywood, running to Whitley Terrace in Whitley Heights.
- Whitley Terrace - an east–west street, in Whitley Heights, Hollywood.
- Whitley Terrace Steps - goes from Milner Road to Emmet Terrace.
- Whitley Avenue - main street in Corcoran, California.
