= List of Welsh Americans =

This is a list of notable Welsh Americans, including both original immigrants who obtained American citizenship and their American descendants.

To be included in this list, the person must have a Wikipedia article showing they are Welsh American or must have references showing they are Welsh American and are notable.

== List ==
=== Fine art ===
- Earl W. Bascom (1906–1995), western artist, sculptor, and inventor; "cowboy of cowboy artists"; "father of modern rodeo"

=== Entertainment ===
- Jessica Alba (born 1981), movie actress, distant Welsh ancestry
- Alexis Arquette (1969–2016), movie actress, distant Welsh ancestry
- David Arquette (born 1971), movie actor and TV director, distant Welsh ancestry
- Patricia Arquette (born 1968), movie and TV actress, distant Welsh ancestry
- Rosanna Arquette (born 1959), movie actress, distant Welsh ancestry
- Michael Aston (born 1964), born in Cornelly, musician
- Andrea Bowen (born 1990), actor
- Erika Christensen (born 1982), actress, distant Welsh ancestry
- Kelly Clarkson (born 1982), singer, distant Welsh ancestry
- Daniel Craig (born 1969), actor
- Miley Cyrus (born 1992), singer and actress
- Bette Davis (1908–1989), two-time Academy Award-winning actress of stage, screen and television; distant Welsh ancestry
- Billy De Wolfe (1907–1974), actor, mother was Welsh
- Thomas Dekker (born 1987), actor, mother is Welsh
- Michael Douglas (born 1944), actor, distant Welsh ancestry
- Leslie Easterbrook (born 1949), actress, distant Welsh ancestry
- Bill Evans (1929–1980), jazz pianist / composer
- Chris Evans (born 1981), actor, Welsh paternal great-great grandfather
- Sara Evans (born 1971), country music singer
- Alice Eve (born 1982), actress
- Glenn Ford (1916–2006), film actor
- G-Eazy, (born 1989), rapper
- Carson Grant (born 1950), actor
- D. W. Griffith (1875–1948), early film director
- Mark Hamill (born 1951), actor, distant Welsh ancestry
- Teri Hatcher (born 1964), actress and writer, distant Welsh ancestry
- Sitara Hewitt (born 1981), actress
- Bob Hope (1903–2003), actor/comedian, mother was Welsh
- Anthony Hopkins (born 1937), born in Port Talbot, Glamorgan; Academy Award-winning film/stage actor
- John Houseman (1902–1988), film producer
- Anjelica Huston (born 1951), actress, distant Welsh ancestry
- John Goodman (born 1952), actor & voice actor, distant Welsh ancestry
- John Huston (1906–1987), film director, screenwriter and actor, distant Welsh ancestry
- Quincy Jones (1933–2024), record producer, conductor, arranger, film composer, television producer, and trumpeter, Welsh paternal grandfather
- Rashida Jones (born 1976), actress, Welsh paternal great-grandfather
- Tommy Lee Jones (born 1946), actor, Welsh father
- Jon Langford (born 1957), musician and artist
- Tommy Lee (born 1963), drummer for hard rock/heavy metal band Mötley Crüe
- Zachary Levi (born 1980), actor, distant Welsh ancestry
- Ted Levine (born 1957), actor, mother was part Welsh
- Blake Lewis (born 1981), American Idol contestant and singer
- Juliette Lewis (born 1973), actress and singer
- Harold Lloyd (1893–1971), actor
- Myrna Loy (1905–1993), actress
- Marco Marenghi, animator, born in Rhondda
- Kelly McGillis (born 1957), actress, distant Welsh ancestry
- Ray Milland (1905–1986), actor
- Wayne Newton (born 1942), distant Welsh ancestry
- Leslie Nielsen (1926–2010), actor, Welsh mother
- Ninja (Tyler Blevins) (born 1991), Twitch streamer, distant Welsh ancestry
- The Osmonds, including Donny Osmond (born 1957), half of the brother-sister singing act Donny & Marie; of part Welsh descent, traced their ancestry back to Merthyr Tydfil
- Karyn Parsons (born 1966), actress, Fresh Prince of Bel Air, Welsh descent on father's side
- Michelle Pfeiffer (born 1958), actress, distant Welsh ancestry
- Brian Pillman (1962–1997), professional wrestler, mother was Welsh
- Chris Pine (born 1980), actor, distant Welsh ancestry
- Ryan Potter (born 1995), actor, distant Welsh ancestry
- Kim Richards (born 1964), actress, distant Welsh ancestry
- Kyle Richards (born 1969), actress, distant Welsh ancestry
- Monica Richards (born 1965), author and musician
- Catherine Zeta-Jones (born 1969), born in Swansea, Glamorgan; actress
- Katherine Jenkins (born 1980), born in Neath, Glamorgan; singer
- Jason Robards (1922–2000), actor, distant Welsh ancestry
- Eric Roberts (born 1956), actor, distant Welsh ancestry
- Julia Roberts (born 1967), actress, distant Welsh ancestry
- Coco Rocha (born 1988), Canadian model of Welsh, Irish, and Russian descent
- Gena Rowlands (1930–2024), actress, father was of Welsh descent
- Susan Sarandon (born 1946), Oscar-winning actress, distant Welsh ancestry
- Brooke Shields (born 1965), actress and model, distant Welsh ancestry
- Esperanza Spalding (born 1984), singer/songwriter, distant Welsh ancestry
- Tiffani Thiessen (born 1974), actress, distant Welsh ancestry
- Henry Thomas (born 1971), actor, distant Welsh ancestry
- Lynda Thomas (born 1981), musician, singer-songwriter
- Scott Walker (1943–2019), singer, distant Welsh ancestry
- Tuc Watkins (born 1966), actor
- Betty White (1922–2021), actress, distant Welsh ancestry
- Michelle Williams (born 1980), actress, distant Welsh ancestry
- Robin Williams (1951–2014), actor, distant Welsh ancestry
- Chris Williams (actor), African-American, English and Welsh descent
- Vanessa Williams (born 1963), African-American, English and Welch descent
- Cassandra Wilson (born 1955), née Cassandra Fowlkes, jazz vocalist; distant Welsh ancestry through her father
- Patrick Wilson (born 1973), actor, distant Welsh ancestry

=== Literature ===
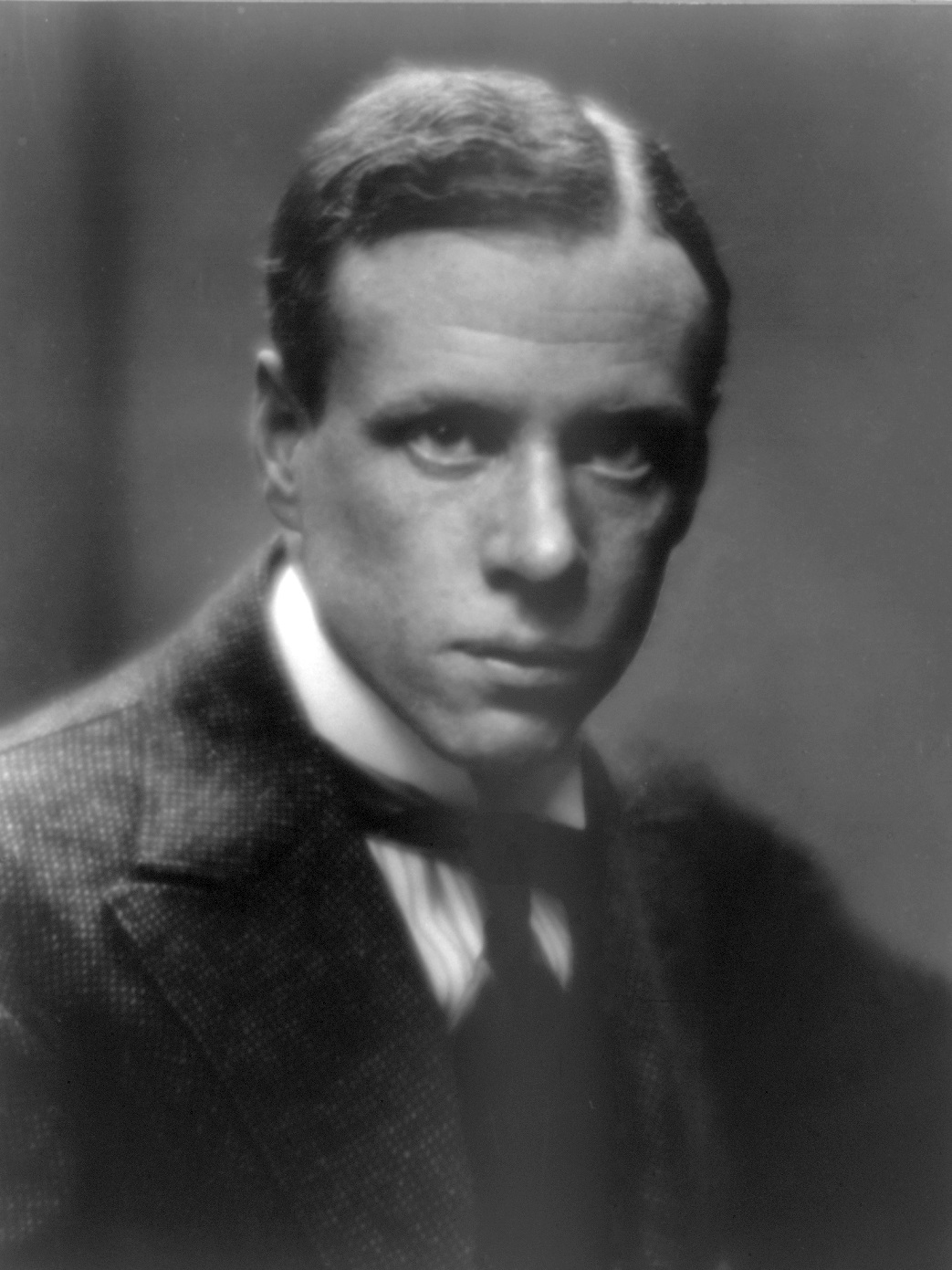
Sinclair Lewis

- Ben Bradlee (1921–2014), author, Executive Editor of the Washington Post
- Ben Bradlee, Jr. (born 1948), author, journalist, newspaper editor at the Boston Globe
- Quinn Bradlee, (born 1982), author
- William Dean Howells, realist novelist, literary critic, and playwright, nicknamed "The Dean of American Letters"
- Grover Jones (1893–1940), playwright, screenwriter
- Sinclair Lewis (1885–1951), novelist/playwright
- Jack London (1876–1916), author
- Edgar Lee Masters (1868–1950), poet/biographer/dramatist
- Hillary Monahan, author
- Ogden Nash (1902–1971), poet, humorist
- Sally Quinn (born 1941), author, first anchorwoman in America

=== Politics ===
- John Adams (1735–1826), President of the United States, Vice President of the United States
- John Quincy Adams (1767–1848), President of the United States, Secretary of State
- John Henry Bowen (1780–1822), U.S. Representative from Tennessee
- Martha Hughes Cannon (1857–1932), physician, Utah women's rights advocate and suffragist, first female state senator elected in the United States, member of the Utah Senate from the 6th district (1897–1901)
- Bill Cassidy (born 1957), United States Senator from Louisiana
- Dick Cheney (1941-2025), Vice President of the United States (2001–2009)
- Cassius Marcellus Clay (1810–1903), abolitionist
- Hillary Clinton (born 1947), Secretary of State, U.S. Senator from New York, former First Lady
- James S. Conway (1796–1855), Governor of Arkansas (1836–1840)
- Calvin Coolidge (1872–1933), President of the United States, Vice President of the United States
- John J. Crittenden (1787–1863), Governor of Kentucky
- D.W. Davis (1873–1959), Commissioner of the U.S Reclamation Service, Governor of Idaho, Idaho State Senator
- James J. Davis (1873–1947), Secretary of Labor and U.S. Senator from Pennsylvania
- Jefferson Davis (1808–1889), President of the Confederate States (1862–1865)
- Alvin Evans (1845–1906), U.S. Representative from Pennsylvania; United States Senator from Iowa
- John Floyd (1783–1837), Governor of Virginia
- John B. Floyd (1806–1863), Governor of Virginia
- William Floyd (1734–1821), United States Declaration of Independence signatory (
- James Garfield (1831–1881), President of the United States
- Nicholas Gilman (1755–1814), United States Senator from New Hampshire
- Button Gwinnett (1735–1777), Governor of Georgia, United States Declaration of Independence signatory
- Benjamin Harrison (1833–1901), President of the United States
- William Henry Harrison (1773–1841), President of the United States
- Charles Evans Hughes (1862–1948), Chief Justice of the United States, Governor of New York
- Andrew Humphreys (1821–1904), U.S. Representative from Indiana
- Andrew A. Humphreys (1810–1883), United States Army officer and Union General in the American Civil War
- E. Howard Hunt (1918–2007), CIA Intelligence Officer; a key figure in organizing and participating in the Watergate burglaries
- Arthur James (1883–1973), Governor of Pennsylvania
- Thomas Jefferson (1743–1826), President of the United States; Vice President of the United States
- John Edward Jones (1895–1896), Governor of Nevada
- Robert E. Lee (1807–1870), Confederate general
- Francis Lewis (1713–1802), United States Declaration of Independence signatory
- Abraham Lincoln (1809–1865), President of the United States
- James Madison (1751–1836), President of the United States
- John Marshall (1755–1835), statesman, Chief Justice of the United States
- Noah M. Mason (1882–1965), United States Congressman from Illinois, Illinois State Senator
- George Mathews (1739–1812), Governor of Georgia
- Henry M. Mathews (1834–1884), Governor of West Virginia
- John G. McCullough (1835–1915), Governor of Vermont
- James Monroe (1758–1831), President of the United States
- James Morgan (1756–1822), U.S. Congressman from New Jersey
- Lewis Morris (1726–1798), United States Declaration of Independence signatory
- Robert Morris (1734–1806), United States Declaration of Independence signatory
- Patty Murray (born 1950), United States Senator from Washington
- Richard Nixon (1913–1994), President of the United States; Vice President of the United States
- Barack Obama (born 1961), President of the United States
- P.B.S. Pinchback (1837–1921), Governor of Louisiana
- Hugh H. Price (1859–1904), U.S. Representative from Wisconsin
- Rodman M. Price (1816–1894), Governor of New Jersey
- John H. Pugh (1827–1905), U.S. Representative from New Jersey
- Thomas Rees (1925–2003), U.S. Congressman, parents/grandparents from Wales
- John Richards (1765–1850), U.S. Congressman from New York, Johnsburg, New York Town Supervisor, Warren County, New York Court of Common Pleas Judge
- Edward V. Robertson (1881–1963), U.S. Senator from Wyoming
- Ann Romney (born 1949), wife of American businessman and politician Mitt Romney
- Theodore Roosevelt (1858–1919), President of the United States; Vice President of the United States
- Isaac Shelby (1750–1826), Governor of Kentucky
- Daniel Webster (1782–1852), United States Senator and Secretary of State
- Louis O. Williams (1874–1937), Illinois state senator
- Thomas Wynne (1627–1691), physician to William Penn; speaker of the first Pennsylvania Provincial Assembly

=== Industry and business ===
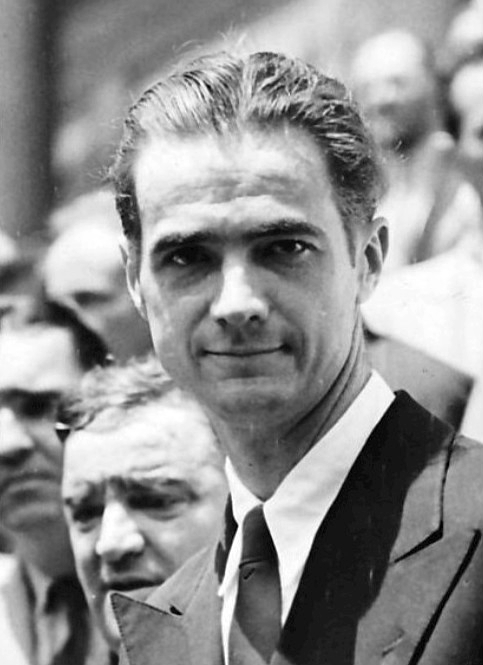
Howard Hughes

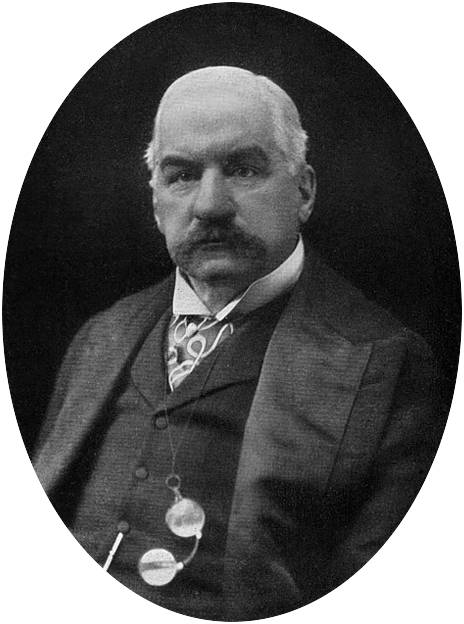
J. P. Morgan

- Thomas Henry Blythe (1822–1883), born in Wales, immigrated to San Francisco, best known for using the Colorado River to irrigate large areas of the California and Mexican deserts
- Jasper Newton "Jack" Daniel (1849–1911), Tennessee-born founder of Jack Daniel's whiskey
- Bob Evans (1918–2007), founder of Bob Evans Restaurants
- William Fargo (1818–1881), pioneer expressman
- Howard Hughes (1905–1976), pioneering aviator, engineer, industrialist, and film producer
- Willard F. Jones (1890–1967), naval architect, Gulf Oil executive
- Reese J. Llewellyn (1862–1936), born in Brynamman, Wales, immigrated to San Francisco, later settling in Los Angeles, co-founder and president of Llewellyn Iron Works
- J. P. Morgan (1837–1913), banker
- Junius Spencer Morgan (1813–1890), banker
- Jonathan I. Schwartz (born 1965), president and chief executive officer of CareZone
- Howard Stringer (born 1942), businessman and chief executive officer of Sony Corporation
- Lloyd Tevis (1824–1899), banker
- David Thomas (1794–1882), prominent ironmaster and philanthropist during the Industrial Revolution in Pennsylvania

=== Other ===
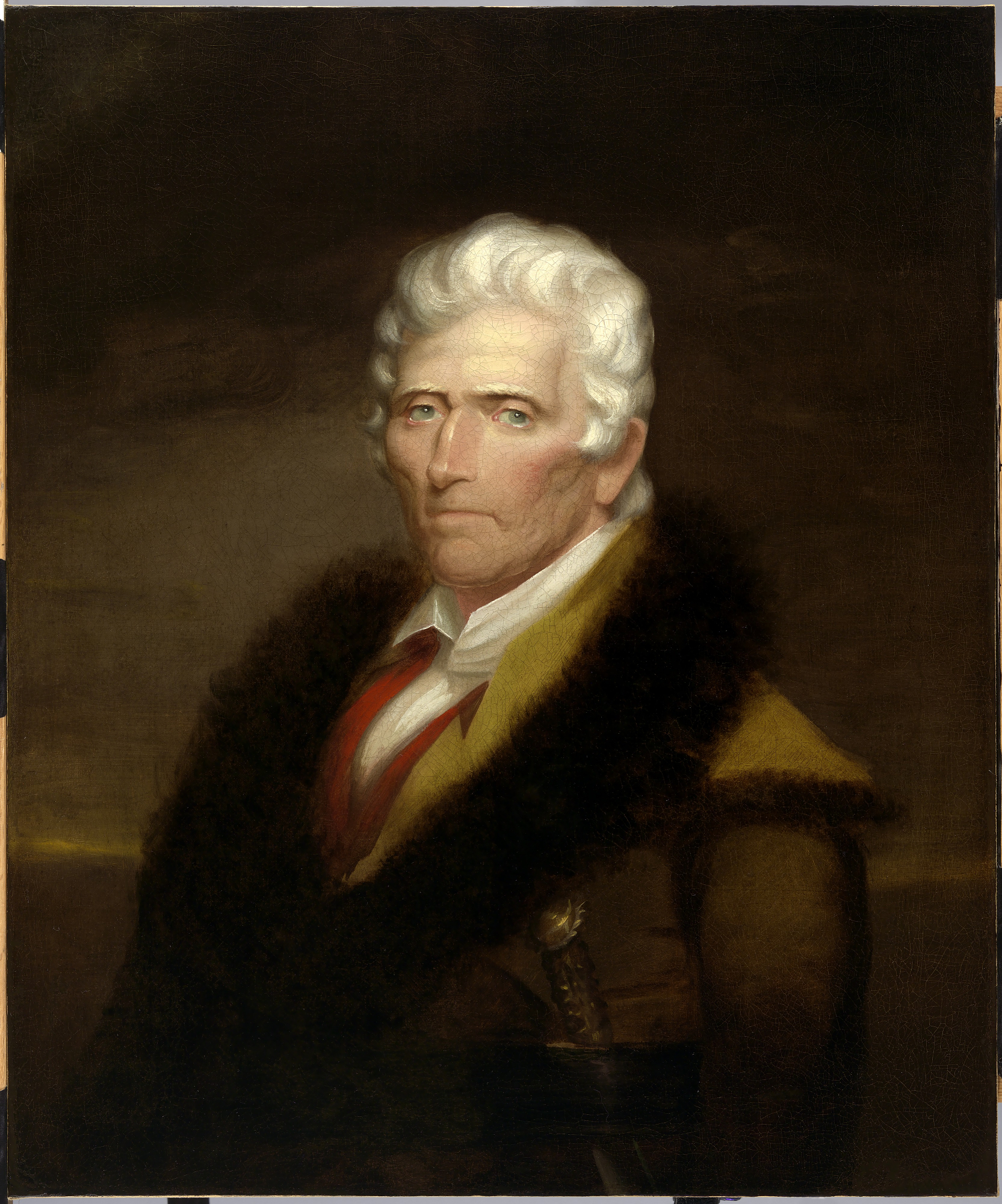
Daniel Boone

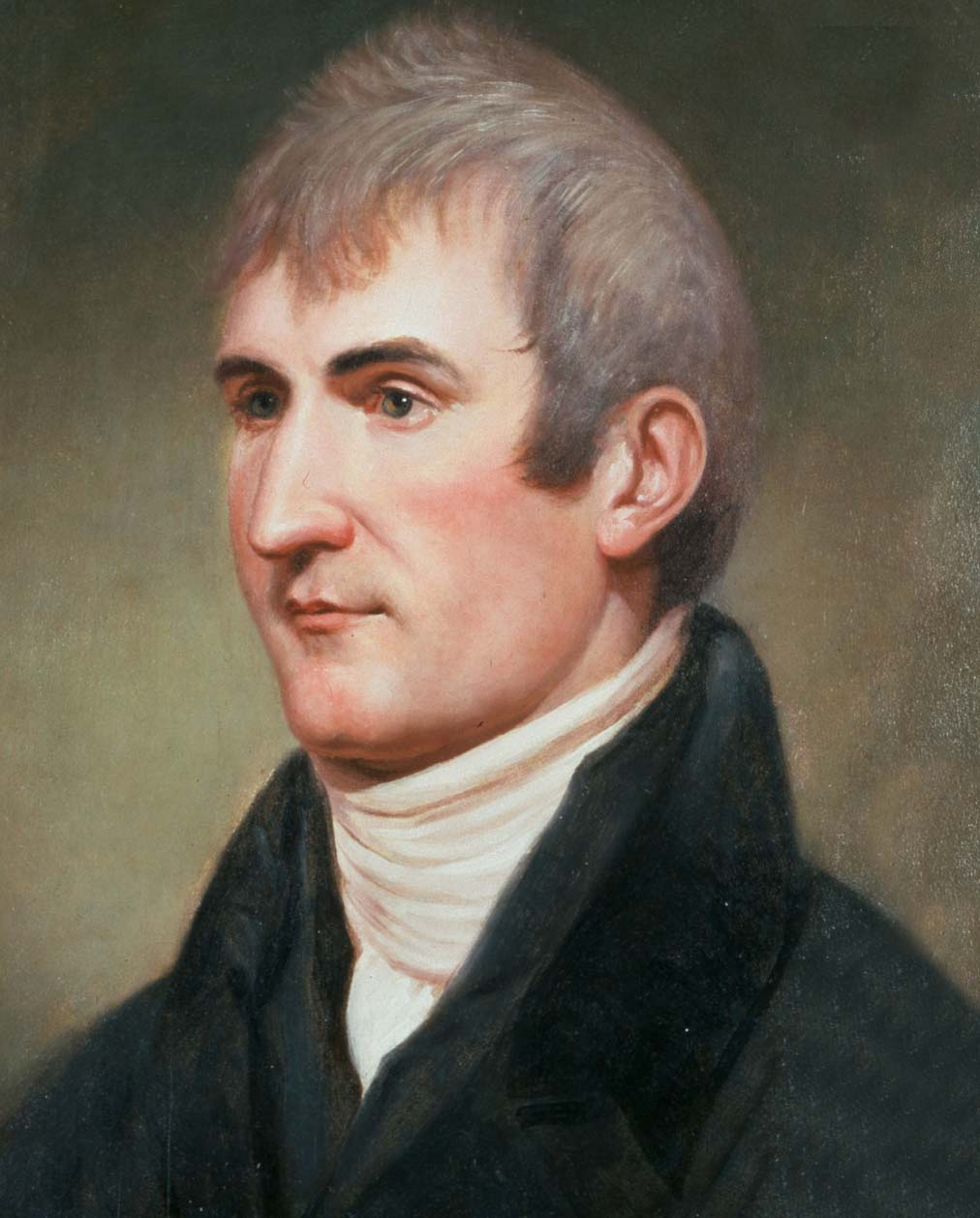
Meriwether Lewis

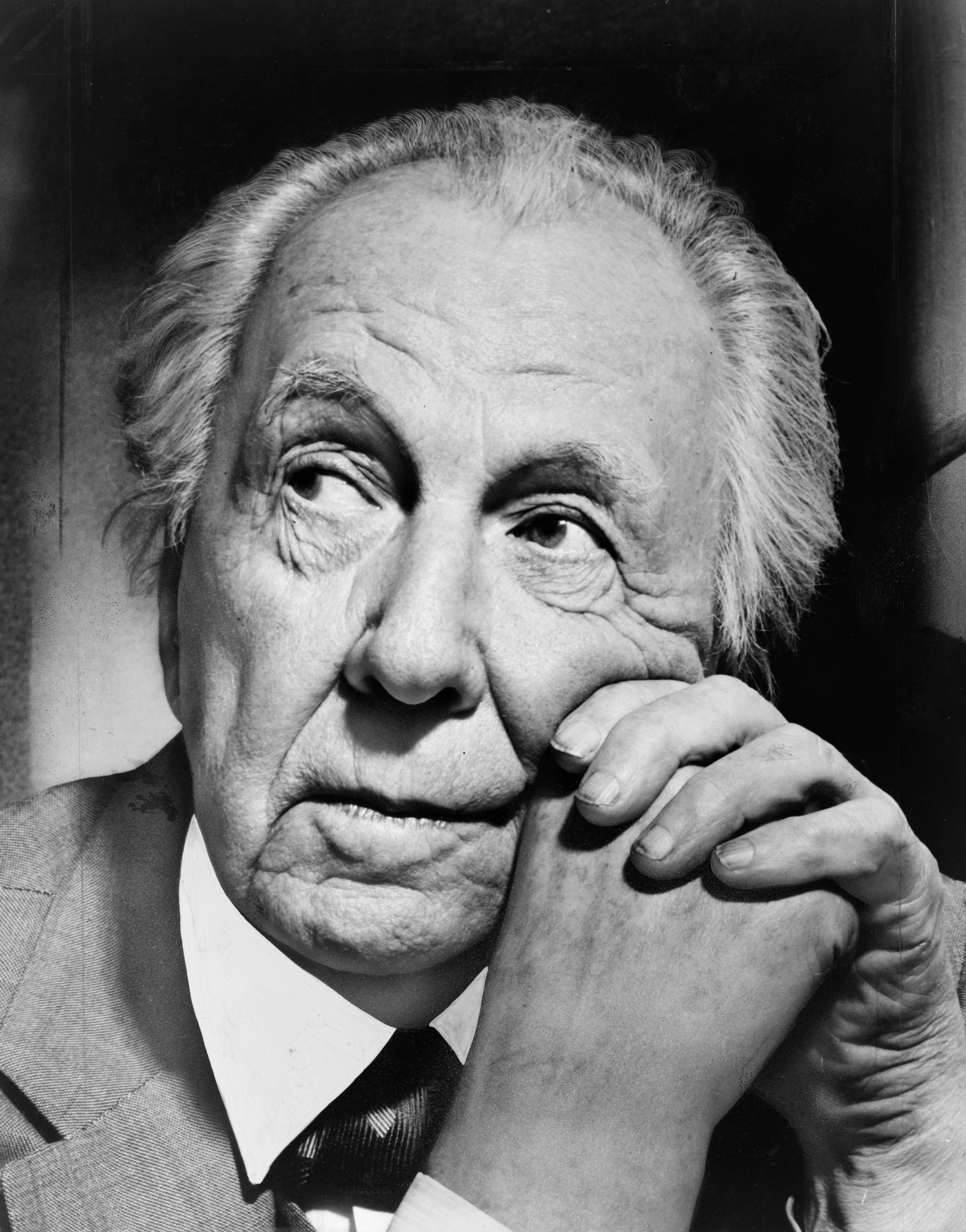
Frank Lloyd Wright

- Jim Jones - Cult leader and mass murderer
- Mervyn S. Bennion (1887–1941), Medal of Honor recipient killed during the Attack on Pearl Harbor; grandfather was a Welsh immigrant
- James Bowie (1796–1836), pioneer and Texas revolutionary
- Daniel Boone (1734–1820), American pioneer
- Mary Katherine Campbell (1905–1990), Miss America titleholder 1922 and 1923, first runner-up 1924
- Jeffrey Lionel Dahmer, serial killer; father has Welsh ancestry
- Hiram Wesley Evans (1881–1966), Imperial Wizard of the "second" Ku Klux Klan, 1922–1939
- Lewis Evans (1700–1756), colonial surveyor and geographer
- Cowboy Morgan Evans (1903–1969), Texas rancher; 1928 World Series Rodeo Bulldogging champion; competition bull rider; oil production roughneck; drilling foreman; oilman
- Oliver Evans (1755–1819), inventor
- Murray Humphreys (1899–1965), Chicago mobster, chief political and labor racketeer in the Chicago Outfit during Prohibition
- Frank James (1843–1915), cowboy/outlaw
- Jesse James (1847–1882), cowboy/outlaw
- George Jones (1811–1891), New-York Daily Times co-founder
- John L. Lewis (1880–1969), organized labor union leader
- Meriwether Lewis (1774–1809), explorer
- Chelsea Manning (born 1987), mother was Welsh
- Nate Marquardt (born 1979), MMA fighter, partially Welsh on his mother's side
- Daniel Morgan (1736–1802), Brigadier General in the American Revolution in the Continental Army; served in the United States House of Representatives, representing Virginia
- Michael Phelps (born 1985), Olympian swimmer, distant Welsh ancestry
- William Farrand Prosser (1834–1911), Union Colonel in the American Civil War; served in the United States House of Representatives, representing Tennessee
- Herbert M. Sauro (born 1960), scientist (UW, Seattle), born in Dyfed
- Henry Morton Stanley (1841–1904), journalist/explorer
- George Henry Thomas (1816–1870), Union General during the American Civil War
- Joe Watts (born 1942), gangster and associate of the Gambino crime family; partially Welsh on his father's side
- Frank Lloyd Wright (1867–1959), one of the most prominent and influential architects of the first half of the 20th century
- Elihu Yale (1649–1721), first benefactor of Yale University
