= Rhys Llewellyn =

Rhys or Reese Llewellyn may refer to:

- Rhys Llewellyn (rugby), rugby union player in 2011 IRB Junior World Championship
- Sir Rhys Llewellyn, 2nd Baronet (1910–1978), Welsh mining executive, soldier, author and dignitary
- Reese J. Llewellyn (1860s–1936), Welsh-American businessman
