= Better America Federation =

The Better America Federation was a pro-business, anti-communist political surveillance organization based in California, U.S. in the 1920s.

== History ==
The organization was founded on May 7, 1920, in Los Angeles, California by Harry Marston Haldeman (the grandfather of Harry R. Haldeman of Watergate fame), railway developer Eli P. Clark and other businessmen, mostly from the utilities sector. It was formed ‘‘for the political welfare of the nation". In practical terms the BAF collected and circulated information on individuals it claimed held radical political ideas, opposed legislation supporting and protecting the right of labor to organize, and opposed all related activities it viewed as "inimical to the welfare of the nation." The organization's headquarters were in Los Angeles, though local chapters were dispersed across California at the organization's peak in the early 1920s.

The Better America Federation evolved from an earlier organization, also led by Haldeman, called the Commercial Federation of California which formed in 1914 as an alliance of open-shop businessmen determined to oppose California's increasingly progressive political character. Its founding president, Harry M. Haldeman, was the president of the Pacific Pipe and Supplies Company. The vice president for Los Angeles County was Reese J. Llewellyn, the president of Llewellyn Iron Works. Donors included private individuals and corporations like Southern California Edison.

The organization published pamphlets and organized other campaigns to introduce democratic literature into Californian public institutions and lobbied members of the California State Assembly. It promoted a conservative interpretation of American patriotism, while alarming the public about the dangers of domestic communism. Furthermore, it argued the United States Constitution should not be amended. The organization was opposed to labor unions and regulation of industry. Moreover, it promoted a six-day workweek and it rejected the minimum wage.

In schools, it warned against "bolshevik" authors like Edward Alsworth Ross, Arthur M. Schlesinger, Sr. and David Saville Muzzey used in textbooks. They also objected to Garfield Bromley Oxnam joining a school board. Moreover, it was opposed to "compulsory education beyond the age of 14". One of its claimed successes was to ban The Nation and The New Republic from public schools in California, which it viewed as full of left-wing political bias. Haldeman also claimed credit for electing a majority of Southern California's representatives to the state legislature in 1918, and for their subsequent promotion of legislation criminalizing radical political speech in California.

Scholars have suggested the organization has influenced conservative politics in California to this day.

== Pamphlets ==
- A Brief Outline of Arguments (1920)
- Behind the Veil
- The Red Menace
- The World Endangered
- America is Calling
- S.O.S.
