= David Saville Muzzey =

American historian (1870–1965)

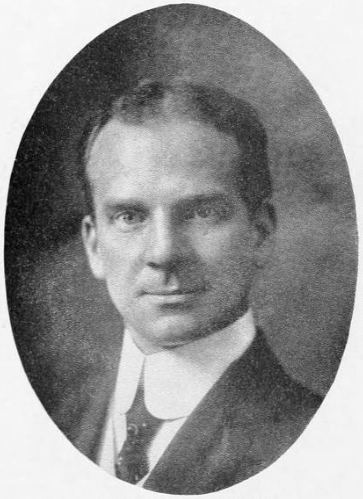
- Born: October 9, 1870; Lexington, Massachusetts, U.S.
- Died: April 14, 1965 (aged 94); Yonkers, New York, U.S.
- Education: Harvard University
- Occupation: Historian
- Parent(s): David W. Muzzey; Anne W. Saville

David Saville Muzzey (1870–1965) was an American historian.

== Biography ==
David Saville Muzzey was born in Lexington, Massachusetts, on October 9, 1870.

His history textbooks were used by millions of American children. Along with Harold Rugg, he was accused of being a "bolshevik" by the Better America Federation. He served as senior leader at the New York Society for Ethical Culture.

He died on April 14, 1965, aged 94, at St. John's Riverside Hospital in Yonkers, New York.
