= Eli P. Clark =

Southern California businessman

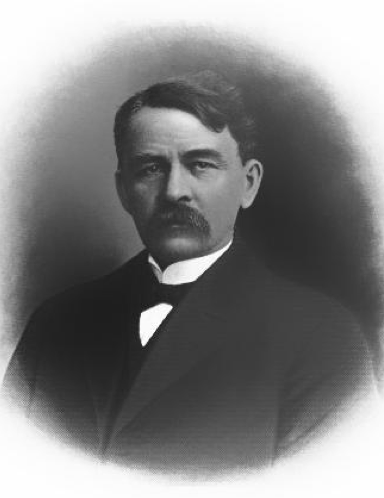
- Born: November 25, 1847; Iowa City, Iowa, U.S.
- Died: 1931 (aged 83–84)
- Education: Grinnell College
- Occupation: Businessman
- Spouse: Lucy H. Sherman
- Children: 1 son, 3 daughters
- Parent(s): Timothy B. Clark; Elvira E. Calkins
- Relatives: Moses Sherman (brother-in-law)

Eli P. Clark (1847–1931) was a pioneer railway builder of Southern California and a leader in the civic, philanthropic and social activities of Los Angeles.

== Early life ==
Eli P. Clark was born on November 25, 1847, near Iowa City, Iowa. His father, Timothy B. Clark, was a prosperous farmer at the time of his birth. His mother was Elvira E. Calkins.

Clark attended the public schools of his district and of Grinnell, Iowa, and later attended Iowa College, also in that city. When he was 18 years of age, he passed the teachers' examination.

== Career ==
Clark was a schoolteacher in Iowa for two years. At the end of that time, when he was 20 years of age, the family removed to southern Missouri, where they located on a large farm. There, Clark was associated with his father in the management and working of the farm during the summer months, and in the winter taught school in the neighborhood of his home.

Clark crossed the plains to Prescott, Arizona, in 1875, the trip requiring three months. There he met Gen. M. H. Sherman, who afterwards became his brother-in-law. In 1877, Clark was appointed auditor of the Arizona Territory, in which position he served for five terms, or ten consecutive years. While in this capacity, he had the attention of Gen. John C. Frémont, then the 5th Territorial Governor of Arizona, and a friendship sprang up between them that ended only with Frémont's death. In 1878, in partnership with A. D. Adams, Clark engaged in the lumber business, operating under the name of Clark & Adams, and also for one year he filled an appointment as assistant postmaster. In Prescott, where he continued to make his home, Clark became interested in the railway business, then of vital import in the territory, and aided materially in securing the passage of a bill by the legislature granting a subsidy of $4,000 a mile for a railroad to be built from Prescott to connect with the Atlantic and Pacific Railroad at Seligman, Arizona. Clark immediately evidenced his further interest in the undertaking by becoming one of the organizers of the new company, of which he was elected secretary and treasurer.

In 1891, Clark came to Los Angeles to be associated with his brother-in-law, General Sherman, in the construction and operation of electric railways in the city and surrounding country. The Los Angeles Consolidated Railroad Company (LACE) was formed, with General Sherman as president, and Clark as vice-president and general manager. The first lines were constructed and electrified by July, 1891 and subsequent growth was rapid. A rival cable operation was acquired in 1892. All local lines were consolidated by 1894 and the system linked many areas in the downtown area, with a total of 108 route miles.

By 1895, with the Los Angeles area affected by the Panic of 1893 and the resulting depression, and with the railway’s finances in dire condition, Clark and Sherman lost control of the Los Angeles Consolidated Electric Railway. The bondholders placed the blame for the line’s troubles on Clark and Sherman, and assumed control of the operation. On March 19, 1895, they renamed the system the Los Angeles Railway. It and other properties would eventually be purchased by Henry E. Huntington in September, 1898 and would ultimately become Los Angeles’ illustrious Yellow Car system.

Clark, reaching out for new interests, acquired local horse-car lines in Pasadena, and was interested in the construction of the Pasadena and Los Angeles Interurban Line, which was in operation in 1895. This line is noteworthy as it was the first interurban line in Southern California.

The growth of the beach district also gave great opportunities for successful enterprises, and another line, the Pasadena and Pacific Railway, between Los Angeles and Santa Monica, was opened for traffic April 1, 1896. This line became the nucleus of a new railway system, the Los Angeles Pacific Railway, incorporated in June, 1898, which covered much of the west side of Los Angeles area through Hollywood and what would become Beverly Hills, Westwood, Santa Monica, Venice and Culver City, and which included a line from Santa Monica down the coast to Redondo Beach. Clark was largely instrumental in the organization of this company, along with brother-in-law Sherman, and was president and general manager.

Though Sherman and Clark had managed to salvage the earlier Los Angeles and Pasadena Electric line when they lost control of the Los Angeles Consolidated Electric Railway, they lost control of that line in January, 1898 and Henry Huntington eventually acquired it. This line was the earliest ancestor of Huntington’s great Pacific Electric Railway.

In 1906, Sherman and Clark sold a controlling interest in their LAP system to E.H. Harriman’s Southern Pacific Railroad for a reported six million dollars. They sold their remaining interest to the Southern Pacific in late 1909, and the Los Angeles Pacific Railway, along with six other electric railways, was merged into the great Pacific Electric system in 1911 in what was known as “The Great Merger”. Most of what was the Los Angeles Pacific Railway became the Western District of the Pacific Electric.

The opportunities offered in the northern country appealed to Clark, and in 1906, he organized and became president of the Mount Hood Railway and Power Company, at Portland, Oregon. The project was put on a successful operating basis, and later Clark sold his interest therein to the Portland Railway, Light and Power Company of Portland.

From the time that he first came to California, Clark was interested in the development of the resources of the state and he invested heavily in real estate. In 1903 Sherman and Clark purchased the site of the present Subway Terminal Building. By the fall of 1905, realizing that a more efficient means of transporting people to the popular beach areas would someday be necessary, they acquired the right of way for a projected subway and purchased property from Hill Street to the Vineyard powerhouse near present-day Venice and La Brea Boulevards. Clark was later vice-president of the Subway Terminal Corporation, which in 1926 completed the Subway Terminal Building over the terminus of the Pacific Electric Railway’s Hollywood subway. In 1913, Clark erected the Hotel Clark across the street from the proposed terminal site, a fireproof, eleven-story structure which at the time was considered the largest reinforced concrete hotel on the west coast.

Clark and Sherman participated in many real estate ventures in conjunction with the development of their rail lines. These included major investments at Sherman (West Hollywood), Hollywood, Playa del Rey, Hermosa Beach and Shakespeare Beach, just north of Hermosa. In addition, the two purchased 640 acres of land in Beachwood Canyon which Sherman and Harry Chandler would develop into Hollywoodland in 1923.

After he severed his railway connections in 1909, Clark devoted his time to private investments which included the Eli P. Clark Company, the Clark and Sherman Land Company, the Del Rey Company, the Main Street Company, the Capitol Crude Oil Company, the Empire Oil Company, and the Sinaloa Land Company. He co-founded the Better America Federation, and was a member of the Los Angeles Area Chamber of Commerce, the Los Angeles Board of Trade, and the Los Angeles Realty Board.

== Philanthropy ==
Clark served on the Board of Trustees of Pomona College. He was a founding member of the Better America Federation. Additionally, he made charitable contributions to the Young Men's Christian Association of Los Angeles.

== Personal life ==
Clark married Miss Lucy H. Sherman, the sister of Moses Sherman, on April 8, 1880, in Prescott, Arizona. They had four children, three daughters and a son.

Clark arranged for 1883 construction of their home in Prescott, which is now listed on the National Register of Historic Places as Clark House.

Clark attended the First Congregational Church. He was a member of the California Club, the Los Angeles Country Club, the University Club and the Los Angeles Athletic Club.

== Bibliography ==
- Guinn, James Miller (1915). A History of California and an Extended History of Los Angeles and Environs: Also Containing Biographies of Well-known Citizens of the Past and Present. Historic Record Company. p. 689.
- Mallory, Mary (2011). Hollywoodland. Charleston, South Carolina: Arcadia Publishing.
- McGroarty, John Steven (1921). Los Angeles From the Mountains to the Sea. Chicago, Illinois: The American History Society.
- Myers, William A.; Swett, Ira L. (1976). Trolleys to the Surf: The Story of the Los Angeles Pacific Railway. Glendale, California: Interurbans Publications, Inc.
- Post, Robert C. (1989). Street Railways and the Growth of Los Angeles. San Marino, California: Golden West Books.
- Sebree, Mac; Walker, Jim (1975). Lines of the Pacific Electric: Southern and Western Districts. Glendale, California: Interurbans.
- Seims, Charles (1982). Trolley Days in Pasadena. San Marino, California: Golden West books.
