= Hotel Clark =

Historic building in Los Angeles, California, US

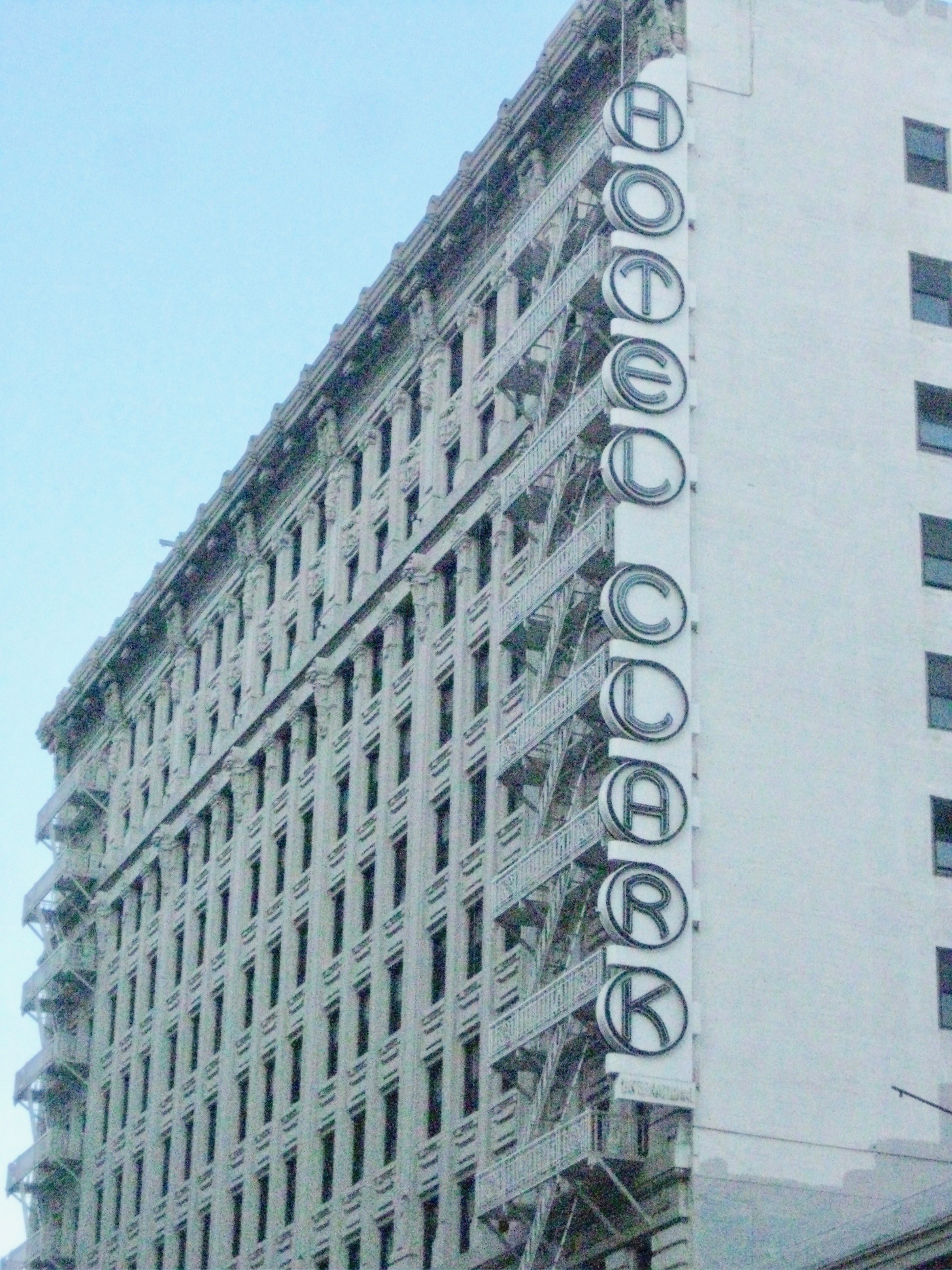
- Alternative names: Clark Hotel

General information
- Location: 426 South Hill Street, Los Angeles, California, US
- Coordinates: 34.04948°N 118.25058°W
- Completed: 1914
- Owner: Chetrit Group

Technical details
- Floor count: 9

The Hotel Clark is a historic hotel in Los Angeles, California, opened in 1914.

== Location ==
The building is located at 426 South Hill Street in Downtown Los Angeles. It is between 4th Street and Hill Street, near Pershing Square.

== History ==
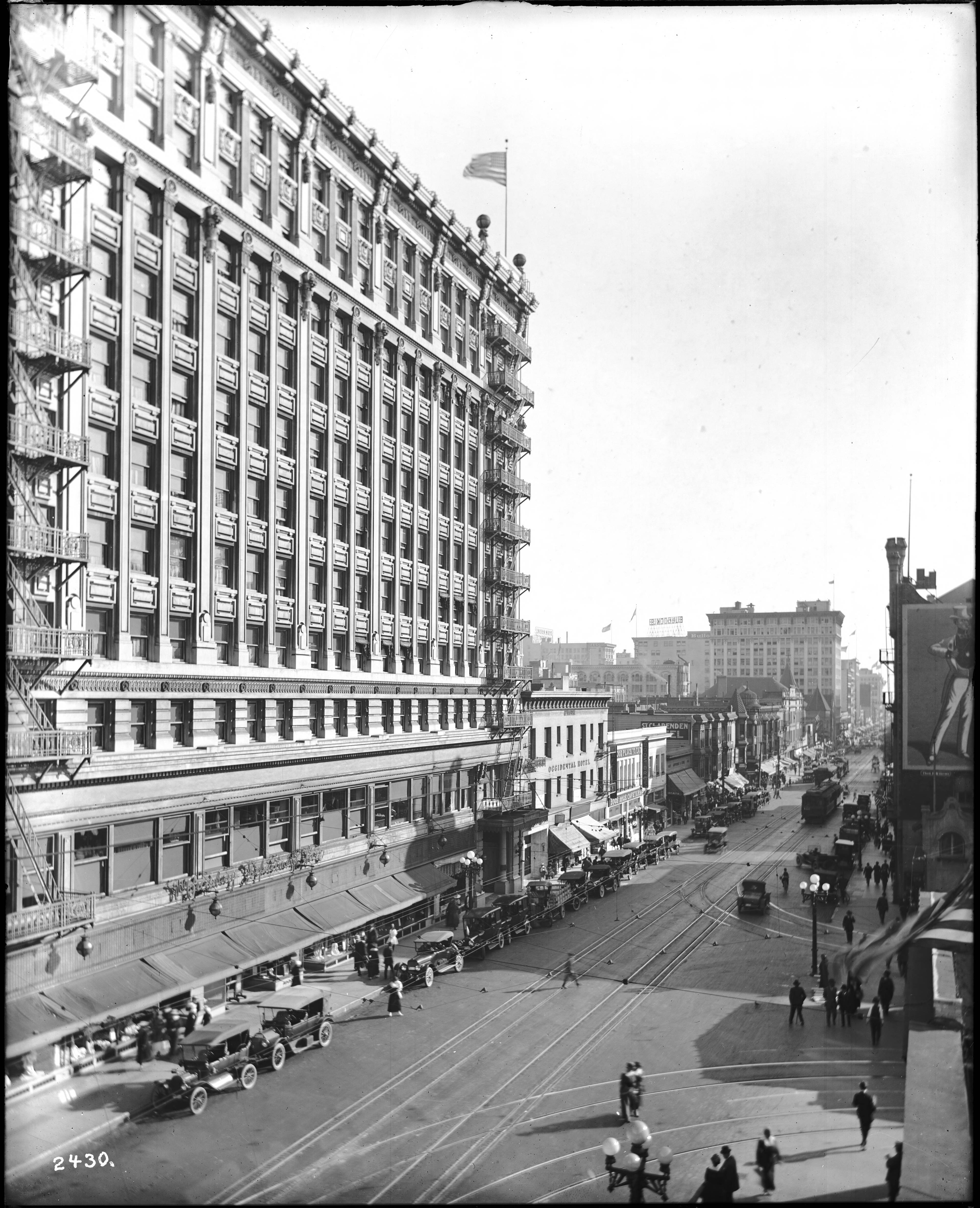
Hotel Clark, circa 1919

The eleven-story, 555-room hotel was built by Eli P. Clark in 1914. Later, the hotel turned into a low-rent apartment building.

It was acquired by JCG Financial Co., followed by Sunday Inn Inc.. When they tried to evict the tenants and turn it into a luxury hotel again in 1979, the tenants filed a lawsuit accusing them of harassment and won. A decade later, in 1988, the building was acquired by the People's Republic of China under the company name of May Wah International Enterprises. Their goal was to turn it into "a Chinese business/cultural center". While the historic facade was preserved, the interior was redesigned in the International Style. When diplomatic relations between the US and China fizzled out, it was turned into a low-rent apartment building. When they tried to evict the residents to raise the rents, they were sued, leading to a US$1.7 million settlement.

The Chetrit Group, chaired by Joseph Chetrit, bought the hotel in 1999. They began remodeling it in 2012. After numerous pauses, the hotel reopened in September 2026, with 120 of the planned 348 rooms available.
