= Clark House (Prescott, Arizona) =

- U.S. National Register of Historic Places
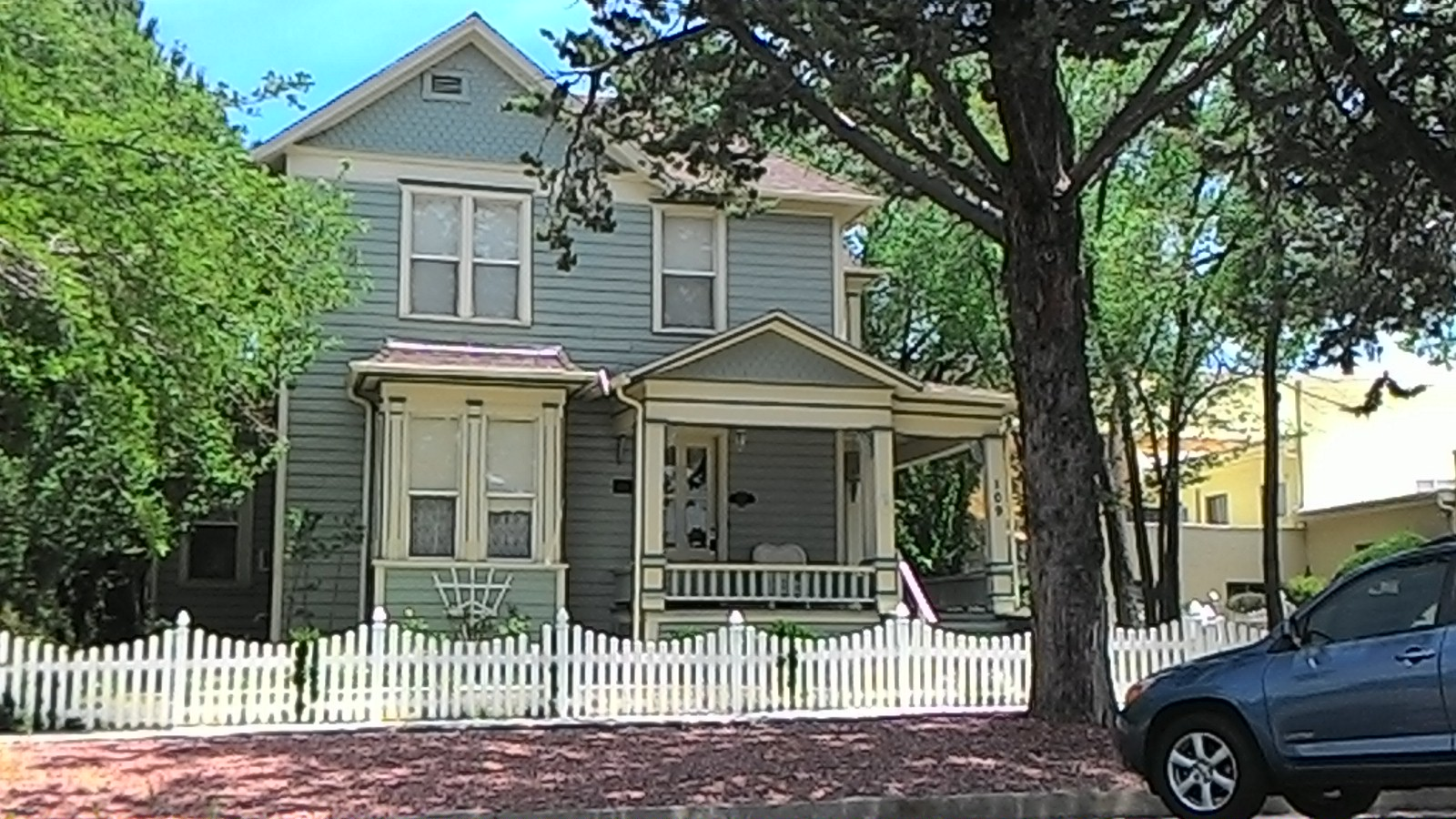
- House in 2016

- Location within Arizona
- Location: 109 N. Pleasant, Prescott, Arizona
- Coordinates: 34.54228°N 112.46435°W
- Built: 1883
- MPS: Prescott Territorial Buildings MRA
- NRHP reference No.: 78003220
- Added to NRHP: December 14, 1978

The Clark House in Prescott, Arizona, at 109 N. Pleasant, was built in 1883, and it was moved a short distance in about 1899. It was listed on the National Register of Historic Places in 1978.

It is a Territorial-style woodframe house, about 30 by 45 feet (9.1 m × 13.7 m) in plan.

It is also known as the Eli P. Clark House, named for Eli P. Clark, a co-owner of the Pioneer sawmill which contractually provided the Atlantic and Pacific Railroad with railroad ties during the railroad's construction. Clark used profits from the contract to build this residence on the northeast corner of Gurley and Pleasant Streets, on a lot which is now a parking lot for a church on Gurley St. It was purchased by a Dr. Pentland in 1899 and was moved, for unknown reason, about 75 feet (23 m) north, so it is now on the second lot up from Gurley St. It faces the Prescott United School District building. At the time of its move, some modifications may have been made, but "the building has retained those features which distinguish it from later styles."

The house was renovated after it was purchased in 2016 and was operated as a vacation rental, the Pleasant Street Guest House.

As of 2025, the house has been renovated again, and now exists as a four-unit apartment complex for lease, including the property's carriage house.

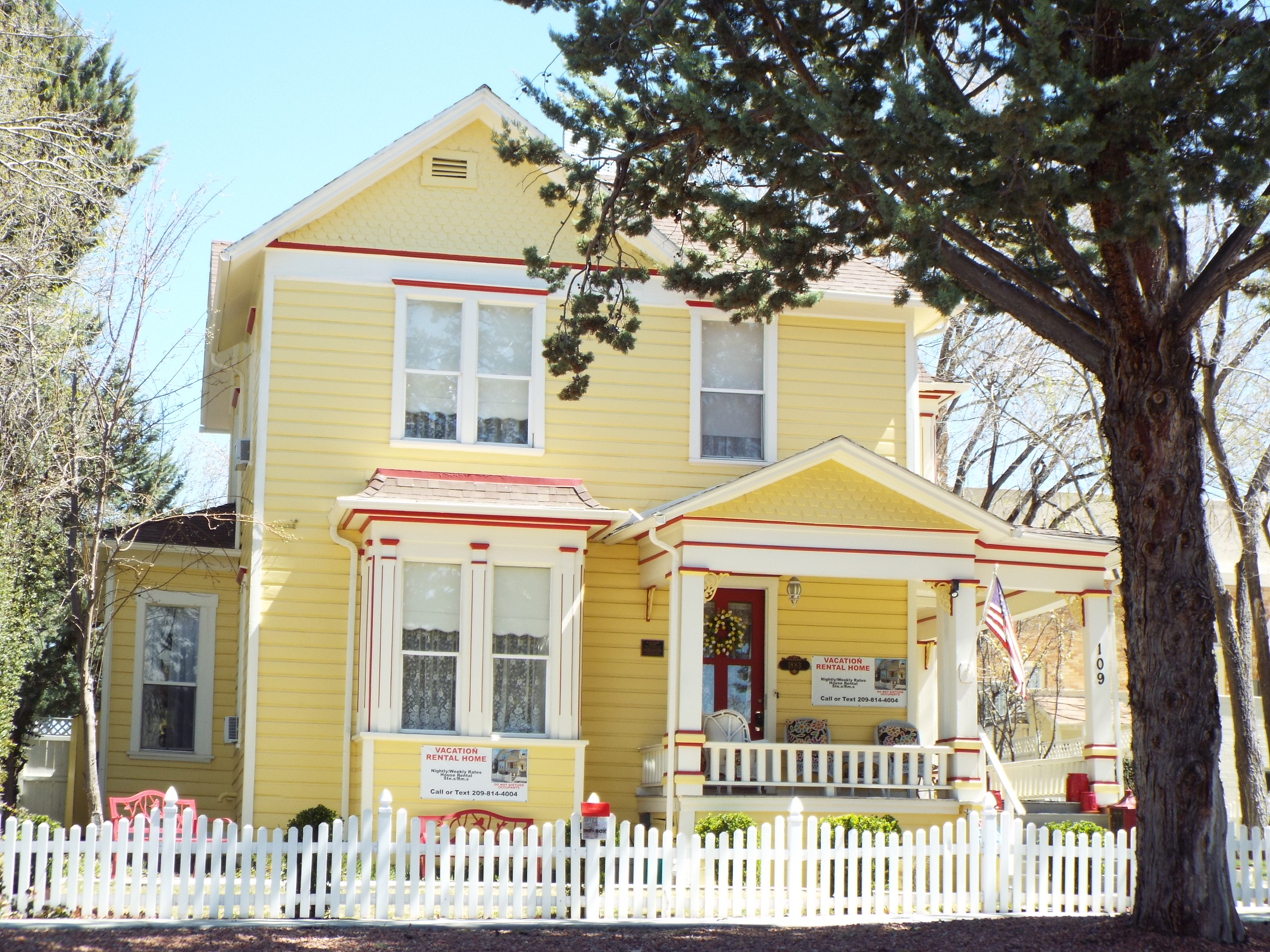
House in 2019
