= Llewellyn Iron Works =

California foundry

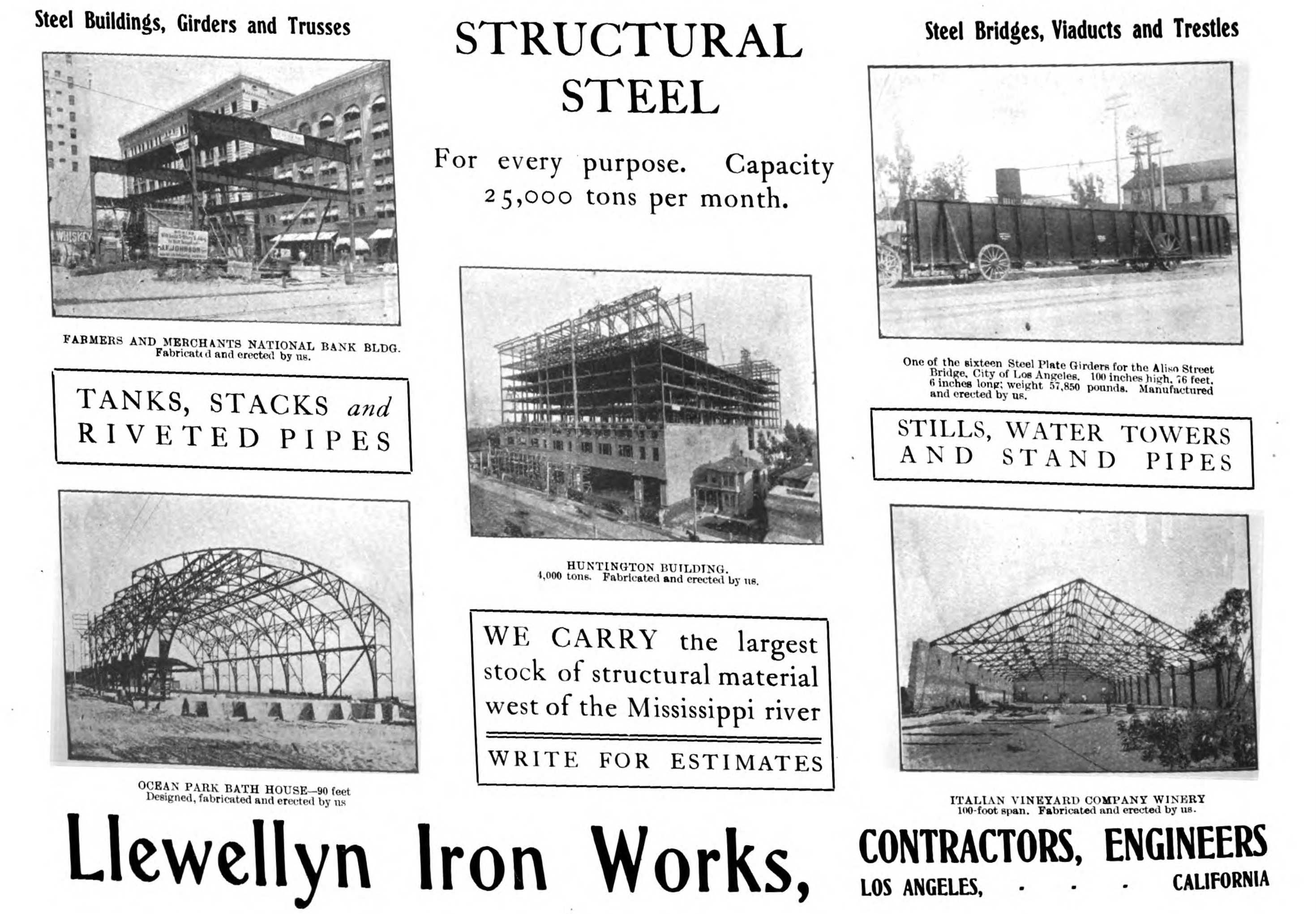
Llewellyn Iron Works advertisement 1904

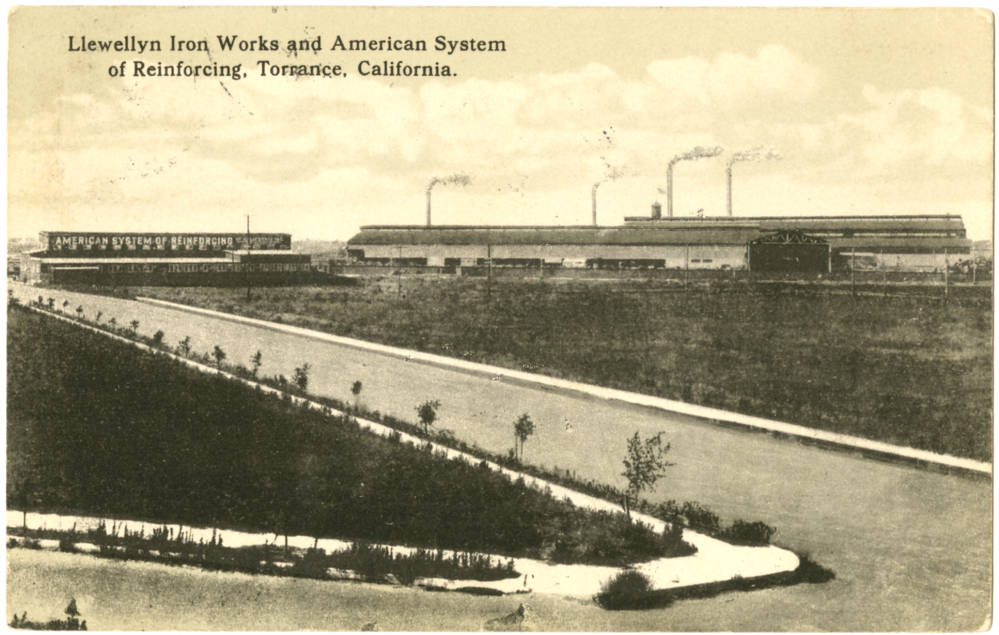
Llewellyn Iron Works and American System of Reinforcing, Torrance, California 1918

Llewellyn Iron Works was a foundry in 19th- and 20th-century Los Angeles and Torrance, California, United States.

== History ==
Brothers Reese Llewellyn, David Llewellyn, William Llewellyn, and John Llewellyn, of Amman Valley, Wales, first organized the company in 1886. The iron works, which had an anti-union leadership team, was bombed on Christmas Day 1910, most likely by Ortie McManigal, an associate of those responsible for the L.A. Times bombing two months earlier. The dynamite explosion at Redondo and Main injured a night watchman. The company moved its factory to Torrance in 1912.

Llewellyn merged with Columbia Steel Corporation of Utah in 1923, and Columbia was acquired by U.S. Steel in 1929. The U.S. Steel plant in Torrance closed in 1979.

=== Production ===
Llewellyn produced the railings that decorate the interior of the Bradbury Building. The steel-rolling mill in Torrance produced the steel used in the L.A. Biltmore Hotel on Pershing Square and several downtown banks.

==== Llewellyn street lights ====
The company also produced street lights, fabricating a variety of electrolier designs and configurations. Their incandescent multi-globe electroliers became so associated with the Llewellyn company that any street light of this style began to be referred to as a Llewellyn. In the early 1900s, Llewellyn street lights were installed in many of the major streets of downtown Los Angeles, most notably on Main, Hill and Spring Streets. More were eventually installed in other commercial districts in the city, and they became the most common street lights in early 20th century Los Angeles.

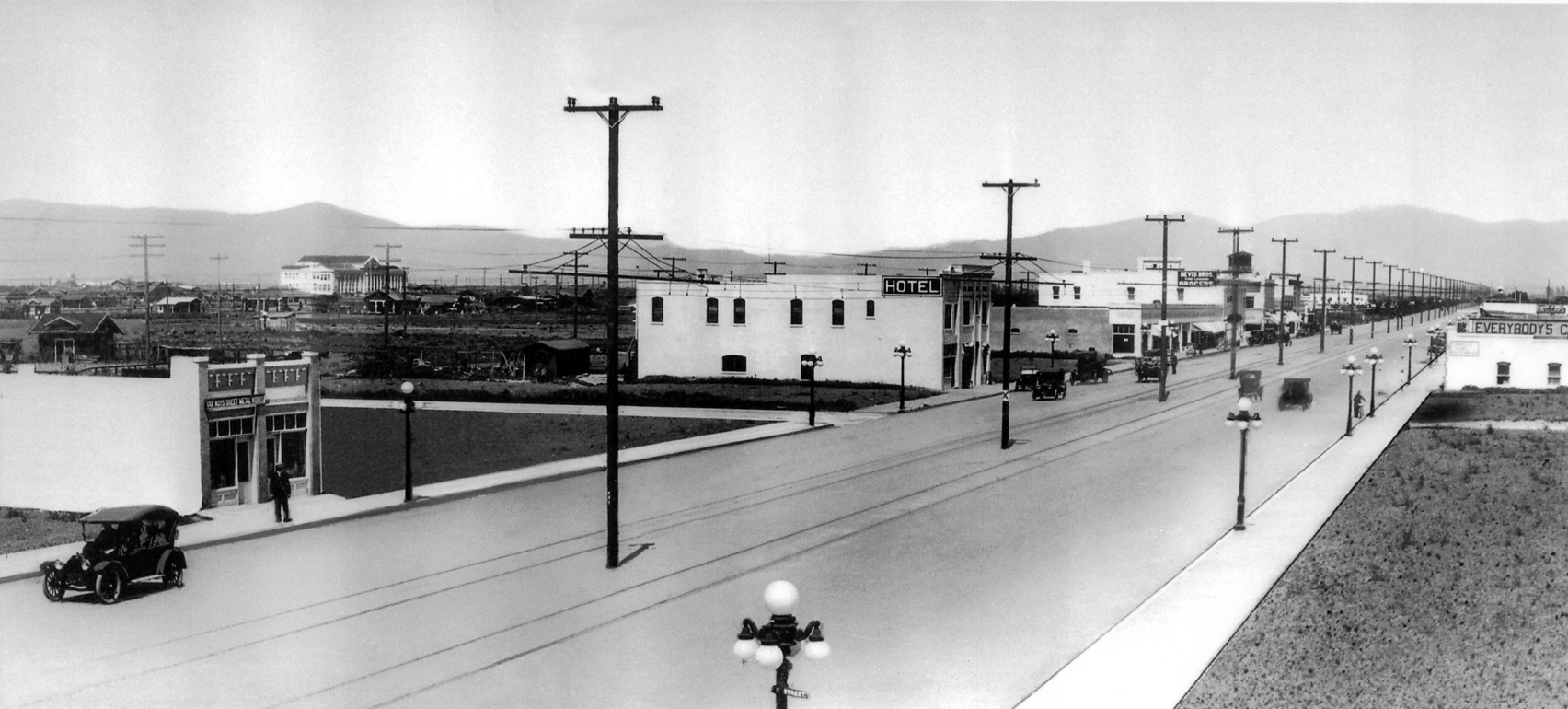
Recently installed 5-globe electrolier Llewellyn street lights in 1913 Van Nuys.

Their use also expanded to other neighboring communities in Los Angeles County. In the southwest San Fernando Valley, then in unincorporated land, Llewellyn street lights were produced for the Van Nuys Highway Lighting District. The district had been organized as the first lighting district in the County on August 10, 1912, and provided for the installation of street lighting in the newly founded communities of Van Nuys, Marian, and Owensmouth. The first street lights were installed along Sherman Way, which connected the townsite. Upon completion, 129 five-globe electroliers were installed in the main parts of the townsites along with 484 three-globe electroliers for a total of 613 street lamps.

Most Llewellyn street lights were eventually replaced. Notably, the CD 943 model street lights, sometimes referred to as the "Llewellyn Slayers" replaced many Llewellyns in Los Angeles.
