= Reese J. Llewellyn =

California businessman (1862–1936)

- Born: Reese James Llewellyn; 30 August 1862; Llangiwg, Glamorganshire, Wales
- Died: 15 December 1936 (aged 64); New York City, U.S.
- Resting place: Forest Lawn Memorial Park (Glendale)
- Occupation: Businessman
- Employer(s): Llewellyn Iron Works (co-founder and president)
- Parent(s): David Llewellyn, Hannah D. James
- Relatives: Llewellyn James Llewellyn (brother), Thomas Llewellyn (brother), William Llewellyn (brother), John Llewellyn (brother), David Edgar Llewellyn (brother), Margaret Winifred Llewellyn (sister), Reese Llewellyn Milner (nephew)

Reese James Llewellyn (30 August 1862 – 15 December 1936) was a Welsh-American businessman. He was the co-founder and president of Llewellyn Iron Works, a company based in Los Angeles, which provided iron works and steel for the construction of buildings in Southern California, the Western United States, Mexico, and South America. The company also produced steel from iron ore and during the World War I shipbuilding boom it was one of the largest manufacturers of triple-expansion steam engines on the West Coast.

== Early life ==
Llewellyn was born in the parish of Llangiwg near Pontardawe in Glamorganshire, Wales, the third of six sons born to David and Hannah (née: James) Llewellyn. His father was an engineer and fitter at an iron works. He emigrated to the United States, first settling in San Francisco, California.

== Career ==
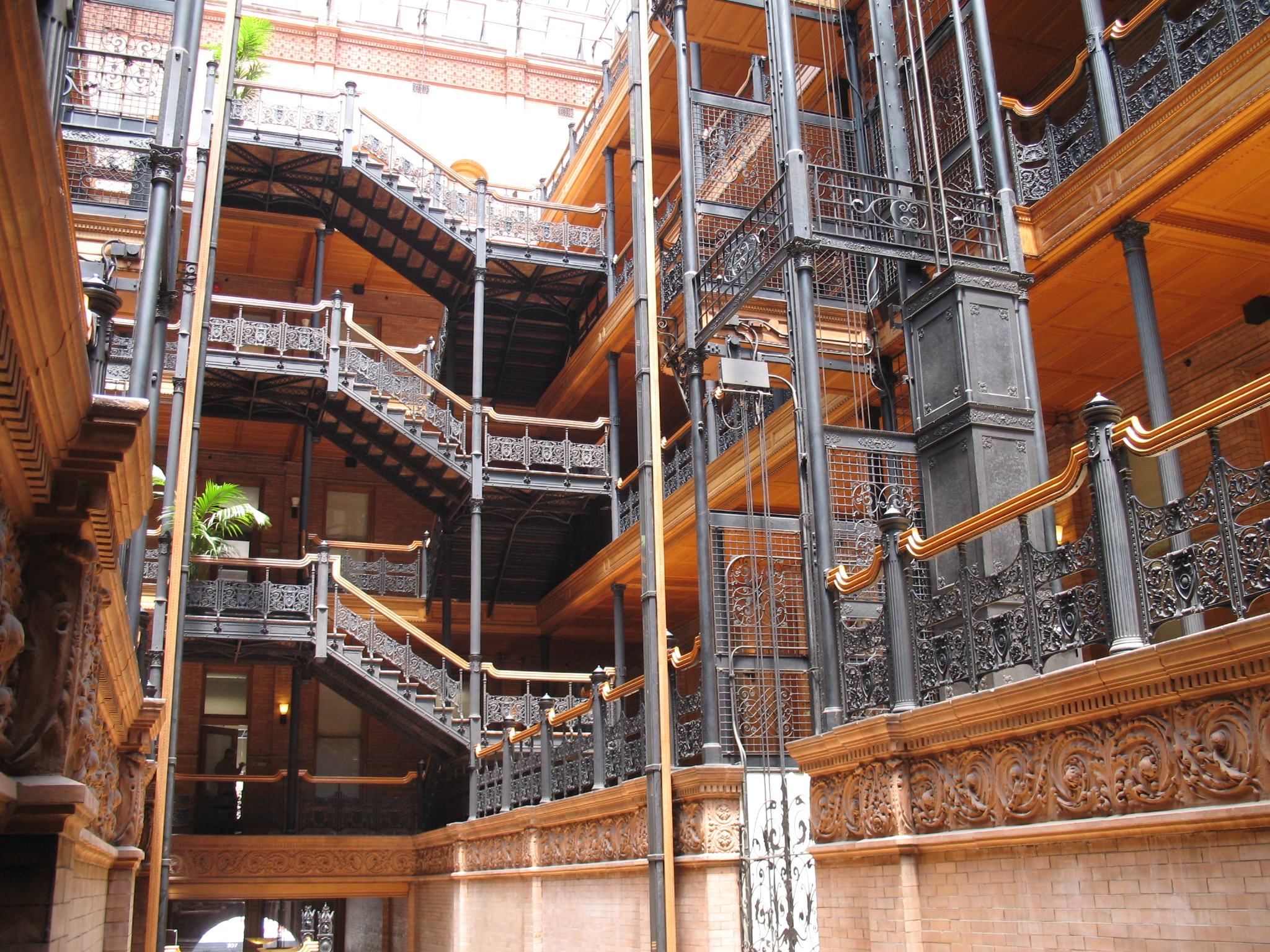
Ironwork inside the Bradbury Building.

Llewellyn was the co-founder of Llewellyn Bros with his brothers in Los Angeles, California in 1889. Llewellyn served as its president, while his brother William was vice-president and his other brother David was secretary.

The firm provided the ironwork inside the Bradbury Building in Los Angeles in the early 1890s. By 1905, it had provided ironwork and steel work in Southern California, but also in Nevada, Arizona, New Mexico as well as abroad in Mexico and South America. Many skyscrapers in Los Angeles were built with steel from the firm. In 1929, the company merged with the Consolidated Steel Corporation.

Additionally, Llewellyn served as the president of the Helsby Red Sandstone Company in 1895. He also served on the board of directors of the Home Savings Bank of Los Angeles in 1905.

== Civic life ==
Llewellyn was a member of the Business Men's Association of Los Angeles, alongside businessmen Walter Newhall, Frank Hicks, John H. Norton, Hancock Banning, Joseph Schoder, James Cuzner, H. E. Graves, and William Lacy. Together, they opposed the closing of saloons in 1905.

By the 1920s, Llewellyn served as the vice president of the Better America Federation for Los Angeles County.

== Death ==
Llewellyn suffered a stroke on board the Grace Line ocean liner Santa Barbara on her trip between Valparaíso and New York City, where he died in 1936. His remains are interred, alongside his parents and siblings, in the Forest Lawn Memorial Park (Glendale).
