= Pasadena, California =

City in California, United States

- City
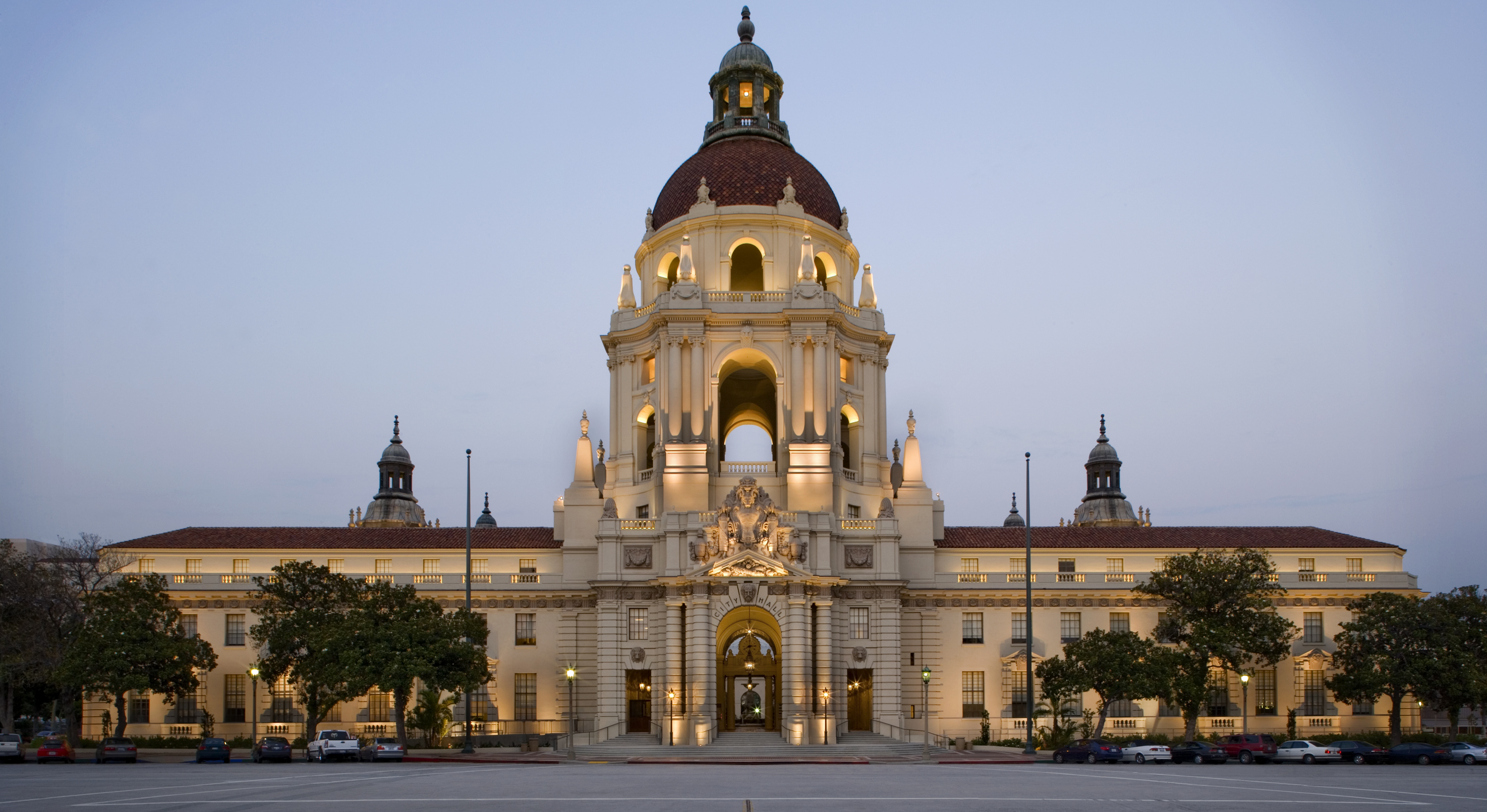
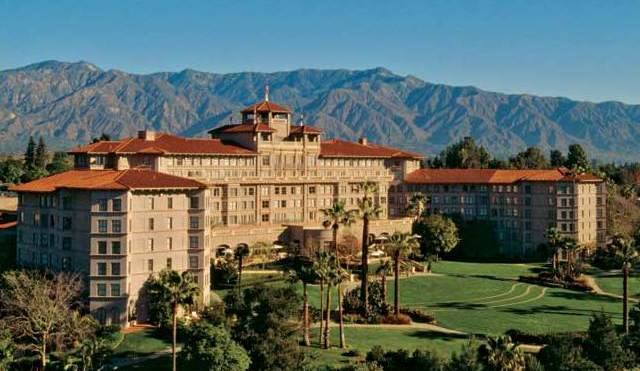
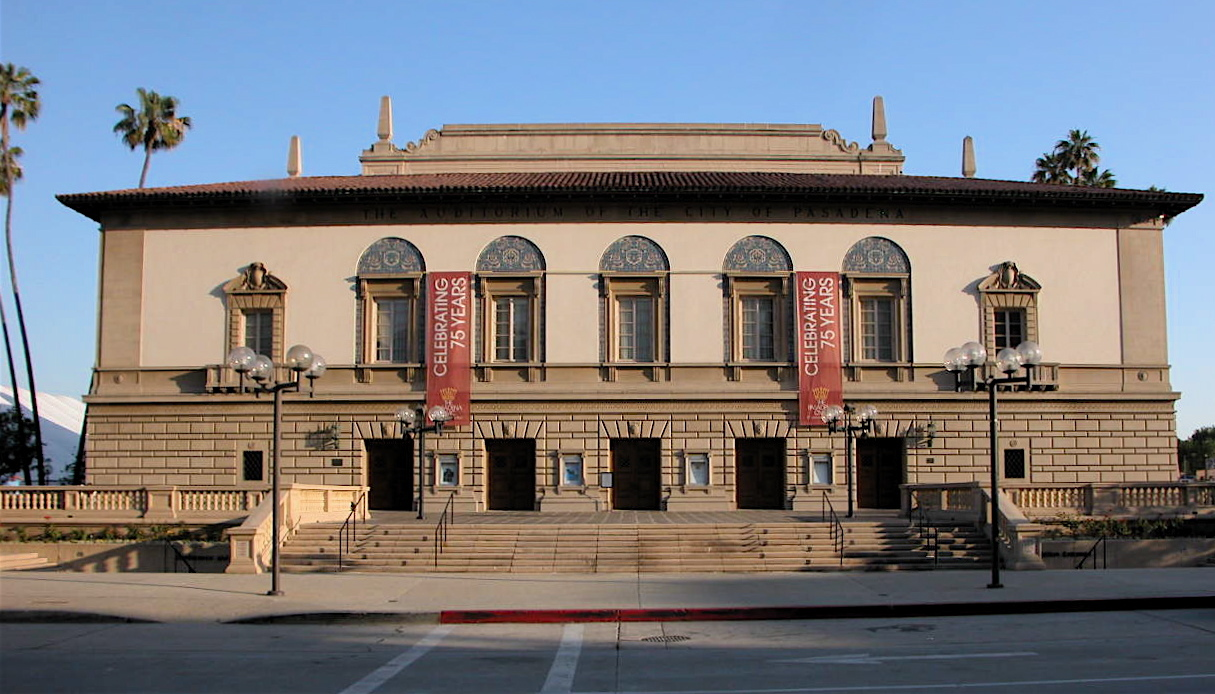
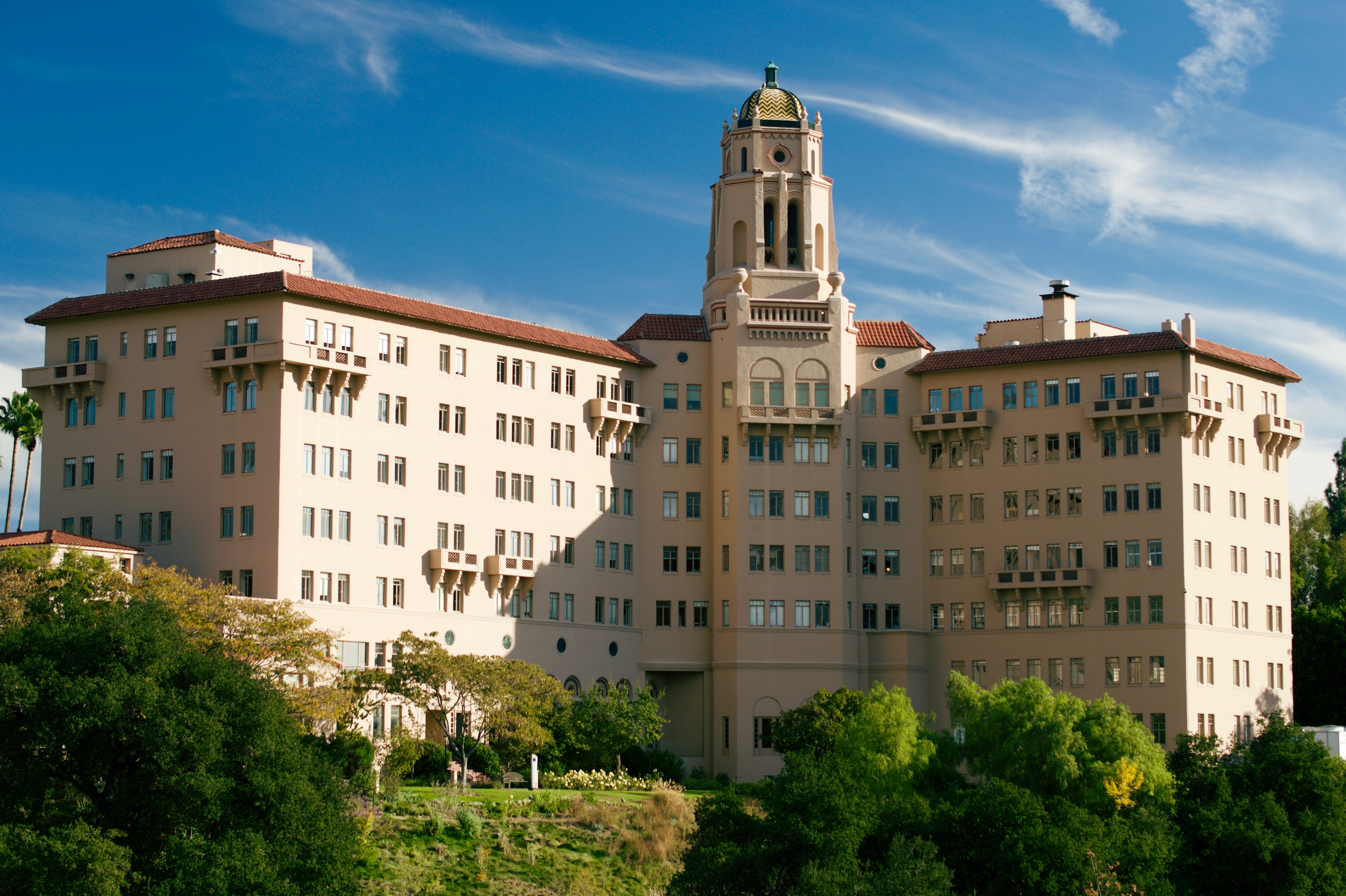
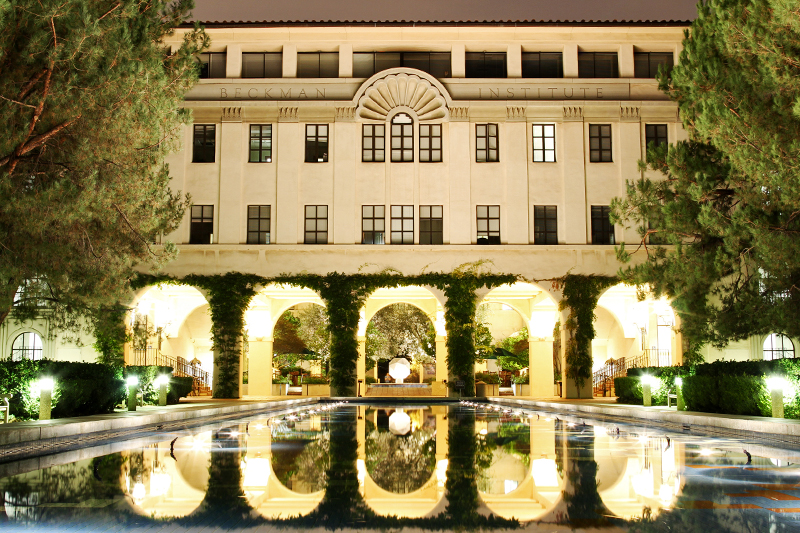
- Pasadena City Hall The Langham Huntington Pasadena Convention Center U.S. Court of Appeals California Institute of Technology

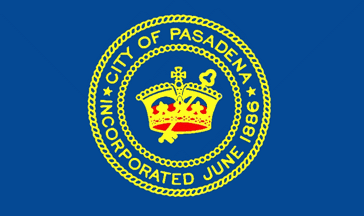
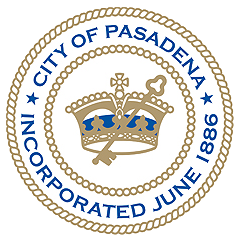
- Flag Seal
- Nicknames: City of Roses, Crown City, Rose Town
- Interactive map of Pasadena, California
- Location within the Los Angeles Metropolitan Area Location within the State of California Location within the contiguous United States
- Coordinates: 34°08′51″N 118°08′38″W
- Country: United States
- State: California
- County: Los Angeles
- Incorporated: June 19, 1886; 140 years ago
- Named for: "Valley" in the Ojibwe language, chosen by American settlers

Government
  - Type: City council/manager
  - Mayor: Victor Gordo (D)
  - City Council: Tyron Hampton; Rick Cole; Justin Jones; Gene Masuda; Jessica Rivas; Steve Madison; Jason Lyon
  - City Manager: Miguel Marquez

Area
  - Total: 23.10 sq mi (59.84 km^{2})
  - Land: 22.96 sq mi (59.47 km^{2})
  - Water: 0.14 sq mi (0.37 km^{2}) 0.68%
- Elevation: 863 ft (263 m)

Population (2020)
  - Total: 138,699
  - Estimate (2025): 135,804
  - Rank: 9th in Los Angeles County; 45th in California; 215th in the U. S.
  - Density: 6,141.5/sq mi (2,371.24/km^{2})
- Demonym: Pasadenan
- Time zone: UTC−8 (Pacific)
  - Summer (DST): UTC−7 (PDT)
- ZIP Codes: 91101–91110, 91114–91118, 91121, 91123–91126, 91129, 91182, 91184, 91185, 91188, 91189, 91199
- Area code: 213/323, 626
- FIPS code: 06-56000
- GNIS feature IDs: 1664804, 2411379
- Flower: Rose
- Website: www.cityofpasadena.net

Pasadena (/ˌpæsəˈdiːnə/ PASS-ə-DEE-nə) is a city in Los Angeles County, California, United States, 10 miles (16 km) northeast of downtown Los Angeles. It is the primary cultural center of the San Gabriel Valley. Old Pasadena is the city's original commercial district.

Its population was 138,699 at the 2020 census, making it the 45th-largest city in California and the ninth-largest in Los Angeles County. Pasadena was incorporated on June 19, 1886, 36 years after the city of Los Angeles but still one of the first in what is now Los Angeles County.

Pasadena hosts the annual Rose Bowl football game and Tournament of Roses Parade each New Year's Day.

== History ==
=== Indigenous history ===
Native Americans lived in the Los Angeles Basin for thousands of years. The earliest known inhabitants of present-day Pasadena and its surroundings were members of the Hahamog-na tribe, a branch of the Tongva Nation. They spoke the Tongva language, belonging to the Northern subfamily of the Uto-Aztecan language group.

Pasadena means "valley" in the language of the Ojibwe, a Native American tribe not local to the region. The name was chosen by American settlers from Indiana who would later move to the area.

=== Spanish era ===
The Spanish first colonized the Los Angeles Basin in the 1770s as part of the Viceroyalty of New Spain, building the San Gabriel Mission and renaming the local Tongva people "Gabrielinos" or "Gabrieleños", after the name of the mission. Today, several bands of Tongva people live in the Los Angeles area.

=== Mexican era ===
In 1821, Mexico became independent of Spain, and California came under control of the Mexican government. In 1833, the mission lands were secularized and most of the lands in California were granted to private Mexican citizens in the form of ranchos. Present-day Pasadena was divided between Rancho San Rafael (lands west of the Arroyo Seco extending to present-day Burbank in the northwest to Glassell Park in the southwest), Rancho del Rincon de San Pascual, (present-day central Pasadena, Altadena, and South Pasadena), and Rancho Santa Anita (present-day east Pasadena, Arcadia, and Monrovia). Rancho del Rincon de San Pascual was so named because it was deeded on Easter Sunday to Eulalia Perez de Guillén Mariné of Mission San Gabriel Arcángel.

=== American era ===
The last of the Mexican owners of Rancho del Rincon de San Pascual was Manuel Garfias, who retained title to the property through the American conquest of California in 1848 and statehood in 1850. Garfias sold sections of the property to the first Anglo settlers to come into the area: Dr. Benjamin Eaton, the father of Fred Eaton; and Dr. S. Griffin. Much of the property was purchased by Benjamin Wilson, who established his Lake Vineyard property in the vicinity. Wilson, known as Don Benito to the local Indians, also owned the Rancho Jurupa (Riverside, California) and was mayor of Los Angeles. He was the grandfather of WWII General George S. Patton Jr. and the namesake of Mount Wilson.

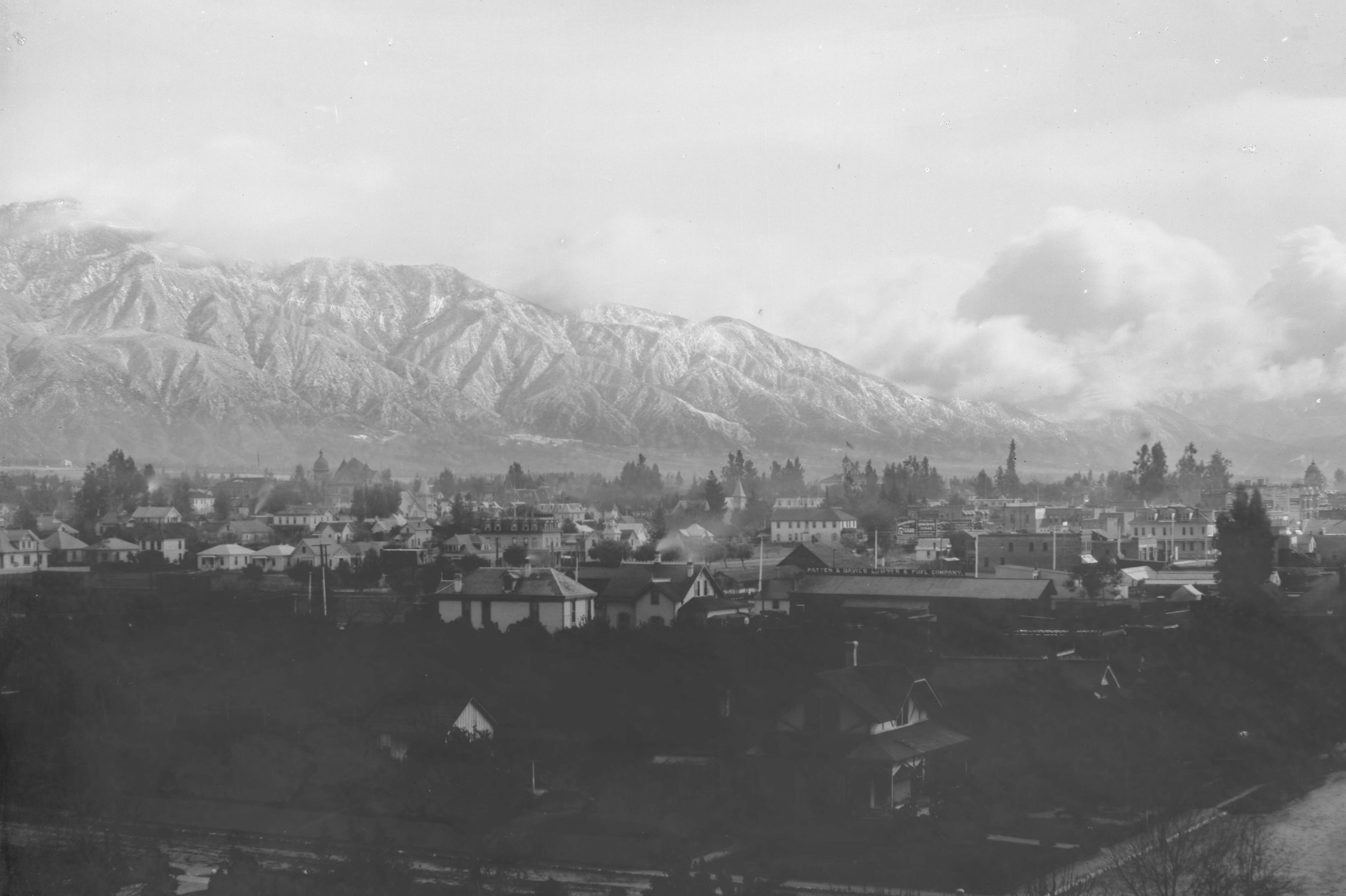
View of Pasadena c. 1898

In 1873, Wilson was visited by Dr. Daniel M. Berry of Indiana, who was looking for a place in the country that could offer a mild climate for his patients, most of whom suffered from respiratory ailments. Berry, an asthmatic, concluded that he had his best three nights' sleep at Rancho San Pascual. To keep the find a secret, Berry code-named the area "Muscat" after the grape that Wilson grew. To raise funds to bring the company of people to San Pascual, Berry formed the Southern California Orange and Citrus Growers Association and sold stock in it. The newcomers were able to purchase a large portion of the property along the Arroyo Seco and on January 31, 1874, they incorporated the Indiana Colony. As a gesture of good will, Wilson added 2,000 acres (8 km^{2}) of then-useless highland property, part of which would become Altadena. Colonel Jabez Banbury opened the first school on South Orange Grove Avenue. Banbury had twin daughters, named Jennie and Jessie. The two became the first students to attend Pasadena's first school on Orange Grove.

At the time, the Indiana Colony was a narrow strip of land between the Arroyo Seco and Fair Oaks Avenue. On the other side of the street was Wilson's Lake Vineyard development. After more than a decade of parallel development on both sides, the two settlements merged into the City of Pasadena.

=== Resort town ===
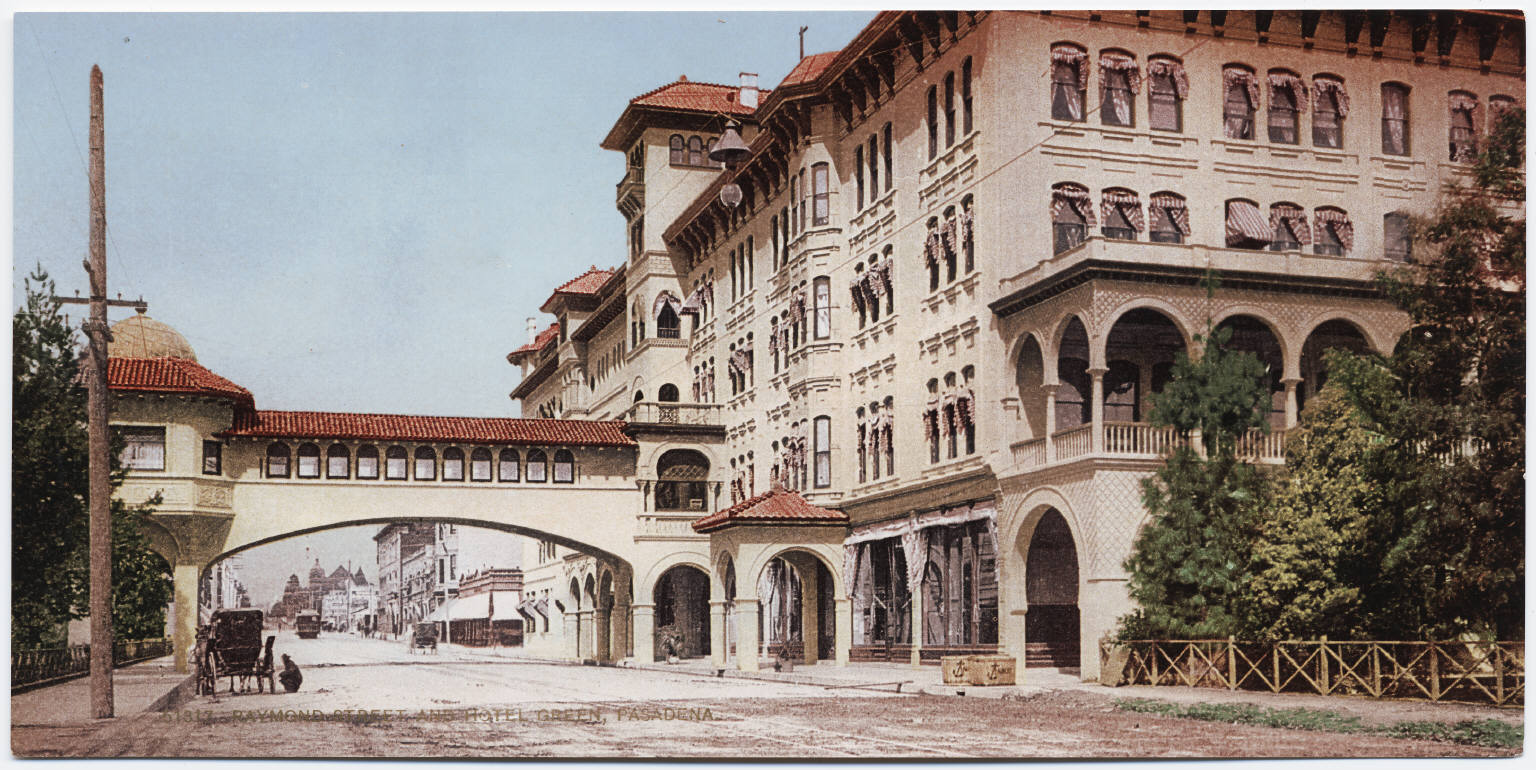
The former Hotel Green in 1900

The region drew people from across the country. In 1887, the Atchison, Topeka and Santa Fe Railway opened the Second District of the Los Angeles Division and began making stops at the Santa Fe Depot in downtown Pasadena. This triggered a real estate boom. Tourist hotels were developed in the city. Pasadena became a winter resort for wealthy Easterners, spurring the development of new neighborhoods and business districts, and increased road and transit connections with Los Angeles. In 1940, when the Arroyo Seco Parkway, California's first freeway, connected Pasadena to Downtown Los Angeles. By that time, Pasadena had become the eighth-largest city in California and was widely considered a twin city to Los Angeles.

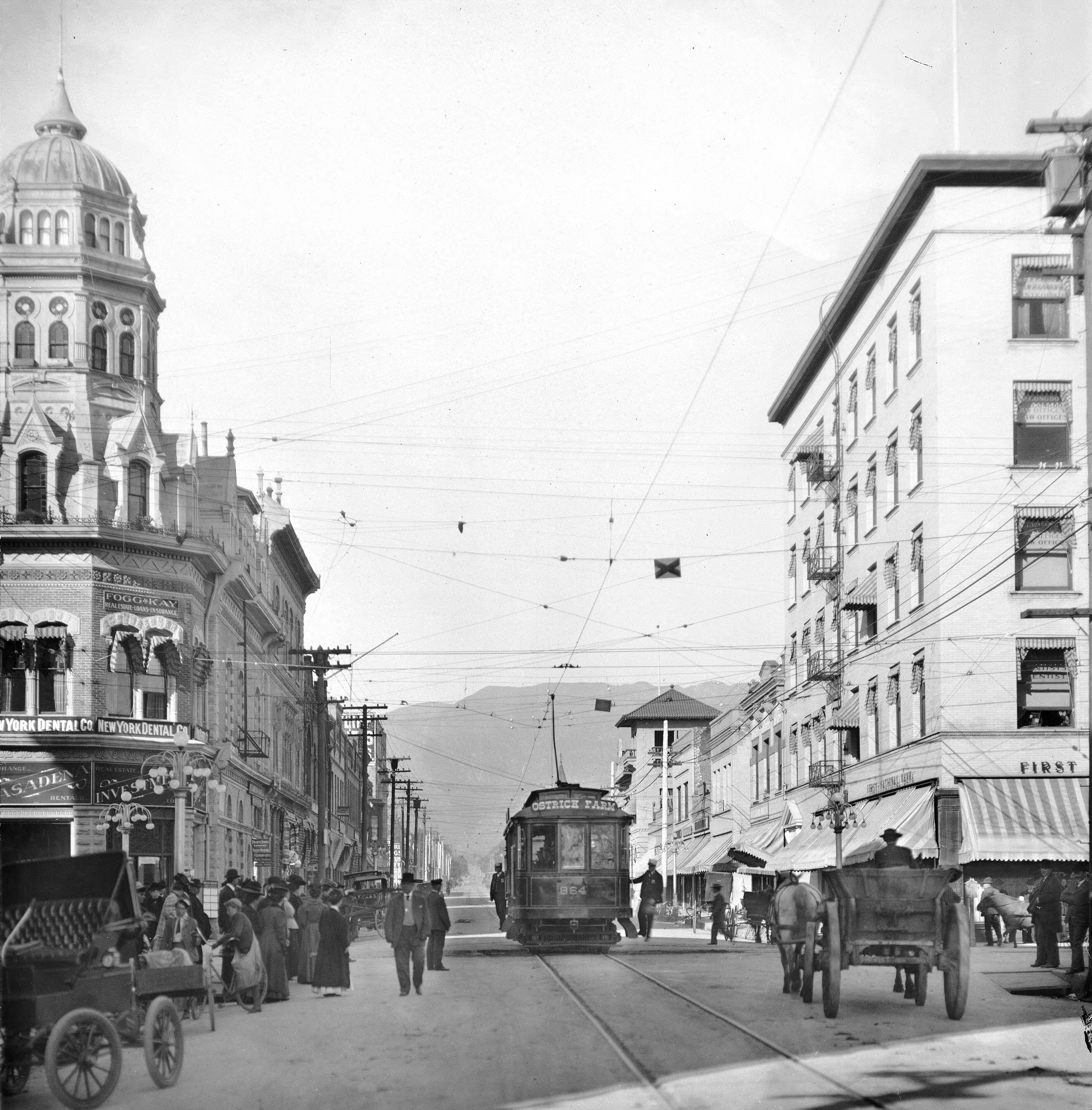
Downtown Pasadena, c. 1910

The first of the hotels to be established in Pasadena was the Raymond (1886) atop Bacon Hill, renamed Raymond Hill after construction. The original Mansard Victorian 200-room facility burned down on Easter morning of 1895, was rebuilt in 1903, and razed during the Great Depression to make way for residential development. The Maryland Hotel existed from the early 1900s and was demolished in 1934. The world-famous Mount Lowe Railway and associated mountain hotels shut down four years later due to fire damage. Three hotel structures have survived, the Green Hotel (a co-op since 1926), the Vista Del Arroyo (now used as a Federal courthouse), and a residential tower of the Maryland at 80 North Euclid Avenue (a co-op since 1953).

The American Craftsman era in art and design is well represented in Pasadena. The architectural firm Greene and Greene developed the style; many of its residences still stand. Two examples of their Ultimate bungalow are the masterpiece Gamble House and the Robert R. Blacker House, both designated California Historical Landmarks and enrolled on the U.S. National Register of Historic Places.

=== Contemporary ===
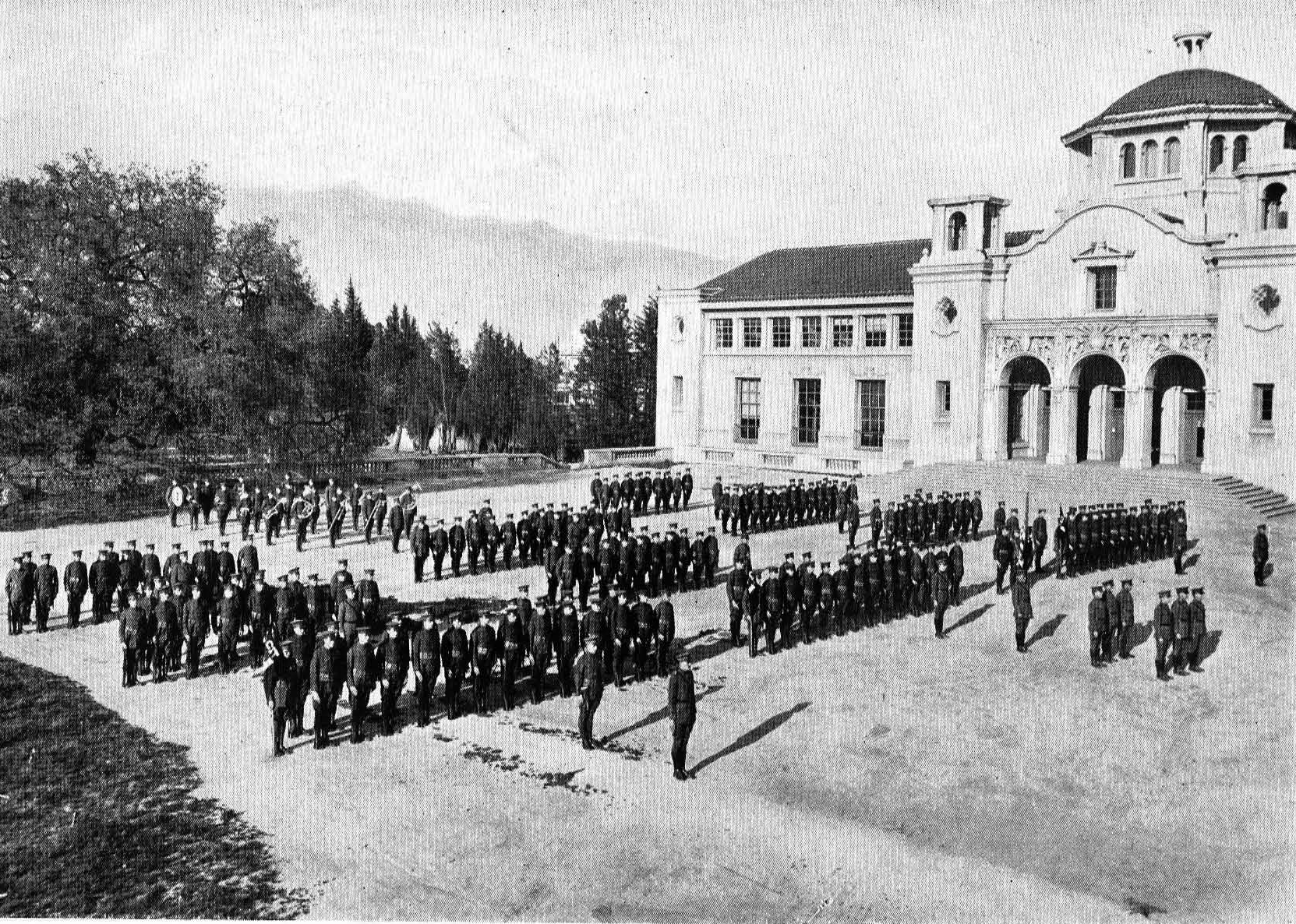
The California Institute of Technology in 1925

World War II was a boon to Pasadena. Southern California became a major staging area for the Pacific War. High-tech manufacturing and scientific companies made the city their home, a trend that continued in the decades following the war, notably with NASA's Jet Propulsion Laboratory, Tetra Tech, and Ameron International.

In the 1950s, Pasadena saw a steady influx of people from the Southern United States, especially African-Americans from Texas and Louisiana. Pasadena also began hosting a large immigrant community, particularly from China, Japan, Philippines, Mexico, Guatemala, El Salvador, Italy, Armenia, and India.

The American Academy of Dramatic Arts, founded in 1884 in New York, opened its Pasadena campus in 1974. However, in 2001 the conservatory moved from Pasadena to Hollywood. Training actors for the stage in a two year program, the conservatory was the first school in the United States to offer professional education in the field of acting. Point Loma Nazarene University was located in Pasadena for many years before relocating to San Diego County, and retained the names Pasadena University and Pasadena College.

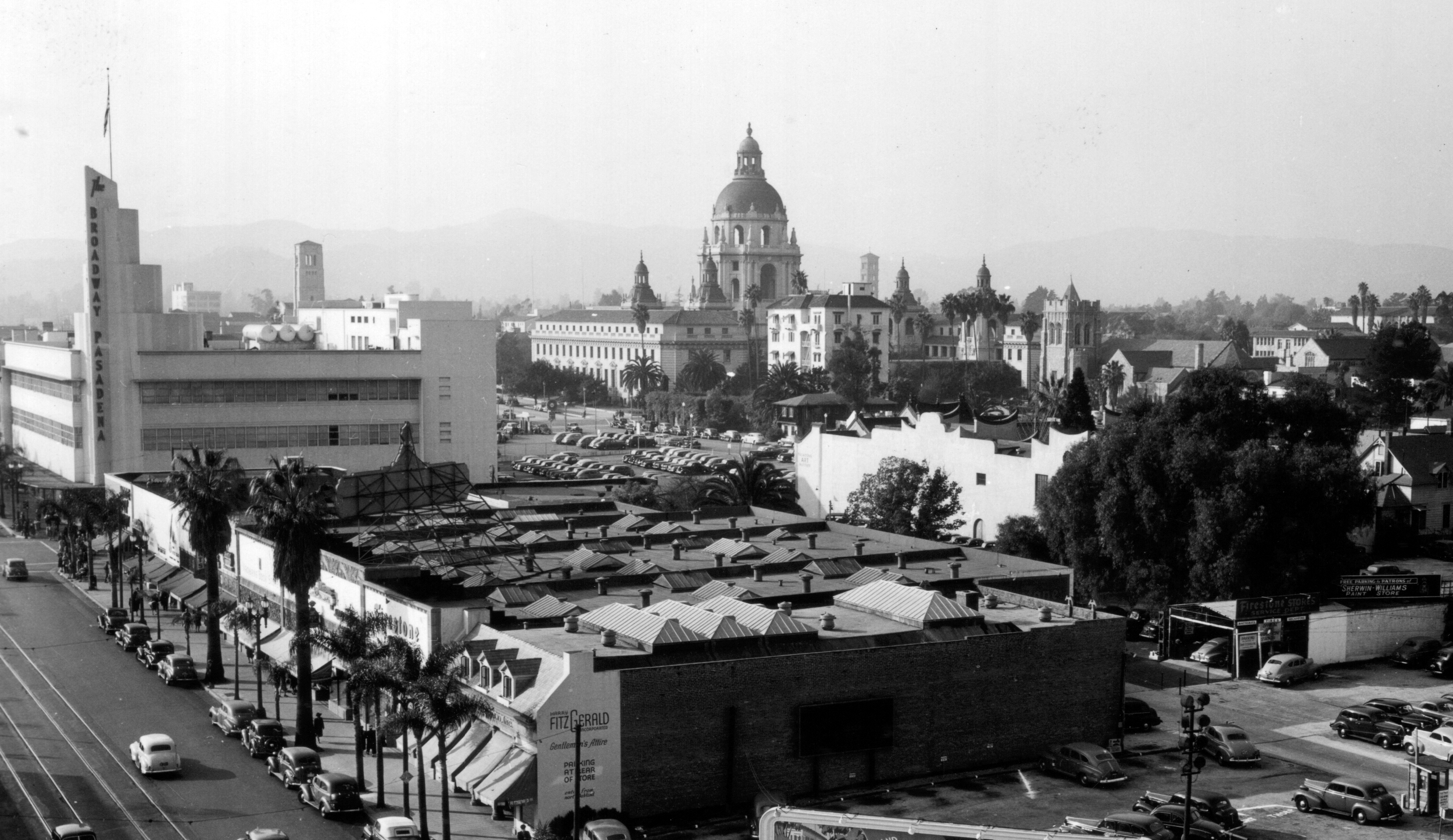
Downtown Pasadena in 1945

In 1969, the Pasadena Unified School District was desegregated, though the issue would continue to be fought in court for a decade. A year later, the 210 Freeway was built along a newly chosen route. The freeway's construction was controversial, as it caused the demolition of over a thousand homes, many historic, and many claimed that the route was designed to cut off the city's less wealthy neighborhoods.

Downtown Pasadena became dangerous in some parts and deserted in others, and incidences of murder and arson skyrocketed. Old Pasadena faced destruction as plans for new high-rise developments were drawn up, though they were mostly stopped by increasingly active preservation advocates. Pasadena suffered demographically as many residents moved for the nearby suburbs or the Inland Empire, causing an overall decrease in population. Despite these setbacks, many local artists and hipsters moved in to take advantage of low property values. Their legacy can be seen today in the Doo Dah Parade which began in 1976.

In 2014, several arrests were made involving an embezzlement scheme which stole an estimated $6.4 million from the city's Underground Utility Program.

In January 2025, portions of Pasadena were destroyed in the Eaton Fire.

== Geography ==
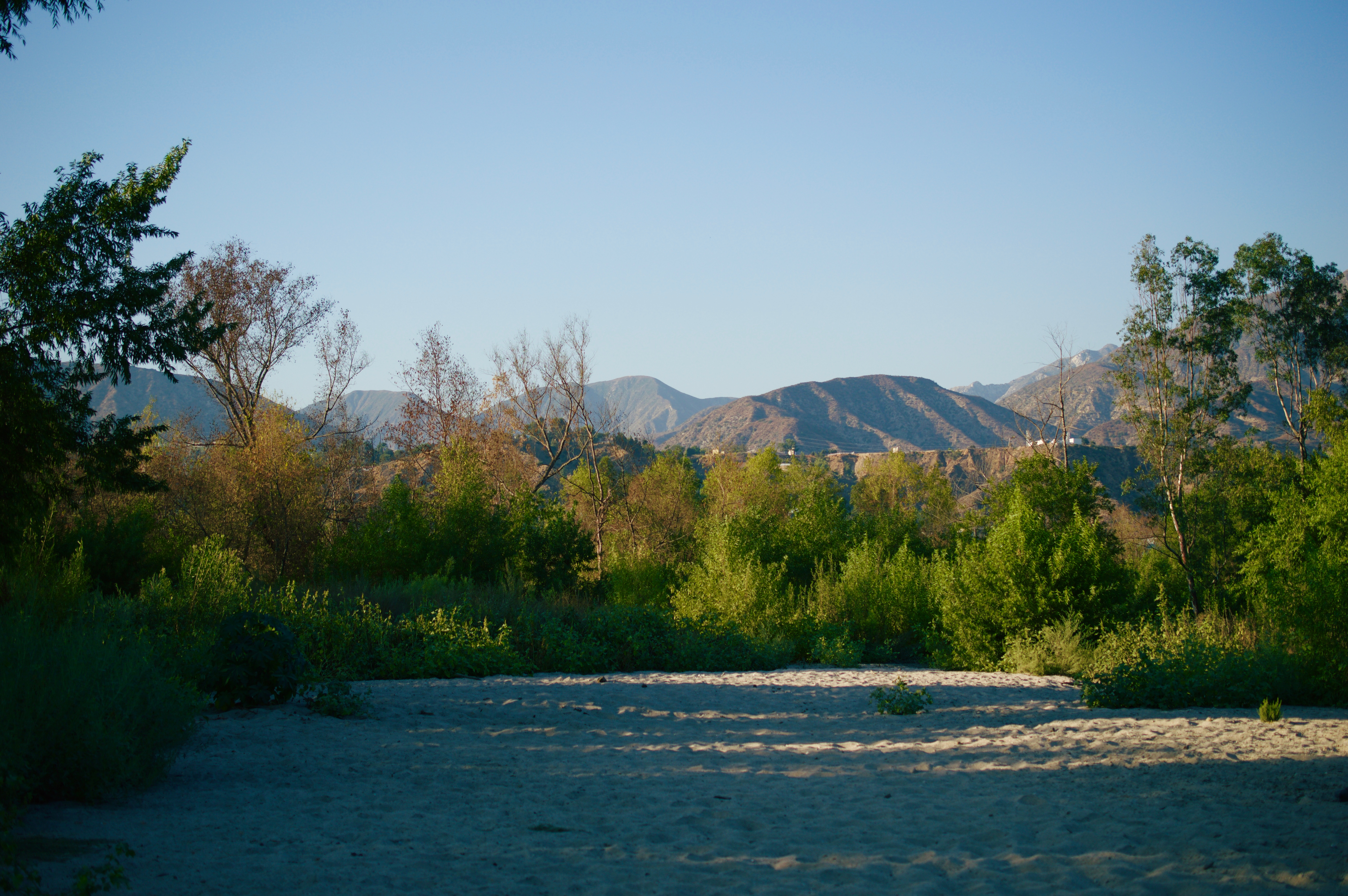
Hahamongna Watershed Park

The greater Pasadena area is bounded by the Raymond Fault line, the San Rafael Hills, and the San Gabriel Mountains. The Arroyo Seco, a major geographic feature and home of the Rose Bowl, flows from headwaters in Pasadena's towering Angeles National Forest greenbelt in the San Gabriel Mountains. According to the United States Census Bureau, the city has a total area of 23.1 square miles (60 km^{2}), over 99% of it land; 0.68% is water.

=== Climate ===
Pasadena

Climate chart (precipitation, max. and min. temperature)
J	F	M	A	M	J	J	A	S	O	N	D
4.5 68 46	5.2 69 46	3 73 48	1.1 76 51	0.5 78 54	0.2 84 58	0.1 89 62	0 91 63	0.2 90 62	0.8 83 56	1.1 75 50	3.3 67 45
- █ Average max. and min. temperatures in °F
- █ Precipitation totals in inches
Metric conversion
J	F	M	A	M	J	J	A	S	O	N	D
115 20 8	131 21 8	77 23 9	28 25 10	12 26 12	5.3 29 14	1.5 32 17	0.8 33 17	5.6 32 16	21 28 14	28 24 10	85 20 7
- █ Average max. and min. temperatures in °C
- █ Precipitation totals in mm

Pasadena has a Mediterranean climate (Köppen Csa), with typically hotter summers and slightly cooler winters than nearby coastal areas. Its location relative to the San Gabriel mountains allows the orographic lift to add several more inches of rainfall per year than nearby areas. During the first few months of the year, Pasadena experiences cool to warm highs, typically in the upper 60s (16–18 °C) to lower 70s (21–24 °C). Colder days are usually accompanied by heavier rain. By April, temperatures warm further, and rain tapers off significantly.

By May and June, rain is typically sparse, but the marine layer becomes more persistent. Locals have dubbed June "June Gloom" as it is the cloudiest month despite being the 3rd driest month. By July, the marine layer subsides as inland areas cool due to an increased monsoon flow. Heatwaves from July through October can be oppressive and lengthy. In addition, it rarely rains during the summer and fall months, and only does when the remnants of hurricanes and tropical storms pass by. In fact, some days in both July and August have never recorded rainfall. It is not impossible to go 6 months without measurable precipitation.

The average highest temperature recorded each year is around 106 °F (41 °C). The hottest heatwaves of the year usually occur in mid to late September. By late October, temperatures drop off. By November, Pacific storms return to Pasadena, bringing increasingly heavy rain and cooler weather. Along with them, however, are the Santa Ana winds. The Santa Ana winds can produce heat, high winds, power outages, tree damage and an increased wildfire threat whenever they strike. By December, lows typically drop into the 40s (below 10 °C) with the occasional reading in the 30s (under 5 °C and down to freezing). Highs remain around 68 °F (20 °C) with heatwaves pushing temperatures into the mid-80s (around 30 °C). A high temperature of at least 85 °F (29 °C) has been recorded on all 365 days of the year, with temperatures over 100 °F (38 °C) possible April through early November.

Climate data for Pasadena, California, 1991–2020 normals, extremes 1893–present
Month	Jan	Feb	Mar	Apr	May	Jun	Jul	Aug	Sep	Oct	Nov	Dec	Year
Record high °F (°C)	93 (34)	96 (36)	101 (38)	105 (41)	104 (40)	113 (45)	113 (45)	109 (43)	115 (46)	108 (42)	101 (38)	93 (34)	115 (46)
Mean maximum °F (°C)	81.7 (27.6)	83.4 (28.6)	86.9 (30.5)	92.6 (33.7)	92.8 (33.8)	96.1 (35.6)	99.3 (37.4)	101.6 (38.7)	103.4 (39.7)	98.3 (36.8)	89.6 (32.0)	80.1 (26.7)	105.7 (40.9)
Mean daily maximum °F (°C)	68.1 (20.1)	69.3 (20.7)	72.6 (22.6)	76.2 (24.6)	78.3 (25.7)	83.7 (28.7)	89.1 (31.7)	91.3 (32.9)	89.9 (32.2)	83.0 (28.3)	74.7 (23.7)	67.2 (19.6)	78.6 (25.9)
Daily mean °F (°C)	56.8 (13.8)	57.7 (14.3)	60.5 (15.8)	63.4 (17.4)	66.1 (18.9)	70.7 (21.5)	75.6 (24.2)	77.2 (25.1)	75.8 (24.3)	69.7 (20.9)	62.1 (16.7)	56.0 (13.3)	66.0 (18.9)
Mean daily minimum °F (°C)	45.5 (7.5)	46.1 (7.8)	48.4 (9.1)	50.6 (10.3)	53.9 (12.2)	57.8 (14.3)	62.0 (16.7)	63.2 (17.3)	61.6 (16.4)	56.3 (13.5)	49.6 (9.8)	44.7 (7.1)	53.3 (11.8)
Mean minimum °F (°C)	38.3 (3.5)	39.2 (4.0)	40.6 (4.8)	43.6 (6.4)	49.2 (9.6)	53.0 (11.7)	57.2 (14.0)	58.6 (14.8)	55.5 (13.1)	50.2 (10.1)	42.8 (6.0)	37.8 (3.2)	35.8 (2.1)
Record low °F (°C)	21 (−6)	26 (−3)	29 (−2)	31 (−1)	32 (0)	41 (5)	45 (7)	43 (6)	41 (5)	36 (2)	26 (−3)	25 (−4)	21 (−6)
Average precipitation inches (mm)	4.51 (115)	5.16 (131)	3.03 (77)	1.11 (28)	0.48 (12)	0.21 (5.3)	0.06 (1.5)	0.03 (0.76)	0.22 (5.6)	0.84 (21)	1.10 (28)	3.33 (85)	20.08 (510.16)
Average precipitation days (≥ 0.01 in)	7.1	7.9	6.2	3.4	2.8	1.6	0.6	0.4	0.8	2.6	3.2	6.1	42.7
Source 1: NOAA
Source 2: National Weather Service

Pasadena averages 20.08 in (510.0 mm) of rain a year, about 6 in (150 mm) more than nearby Los Angeles due to the orographic effect created by the San Gabriel Mountains. The wettest "rain year" was from July 1940 to June 1941 with 46.32 in (1,176.5 mm) and the driest from July 1960 to June 1961 with 7.18 in (182.4 mm). Wet years are commonly associated with El Niño warm surface water in the eastern Pacific and dry years with La Niña cold water conditions. The most rainfall in one month was 19.70 in (500.4 mm) in February 1980. The most rainfall in 24 hours was 7.70 in (195.6 mm) on March 2, 1938.

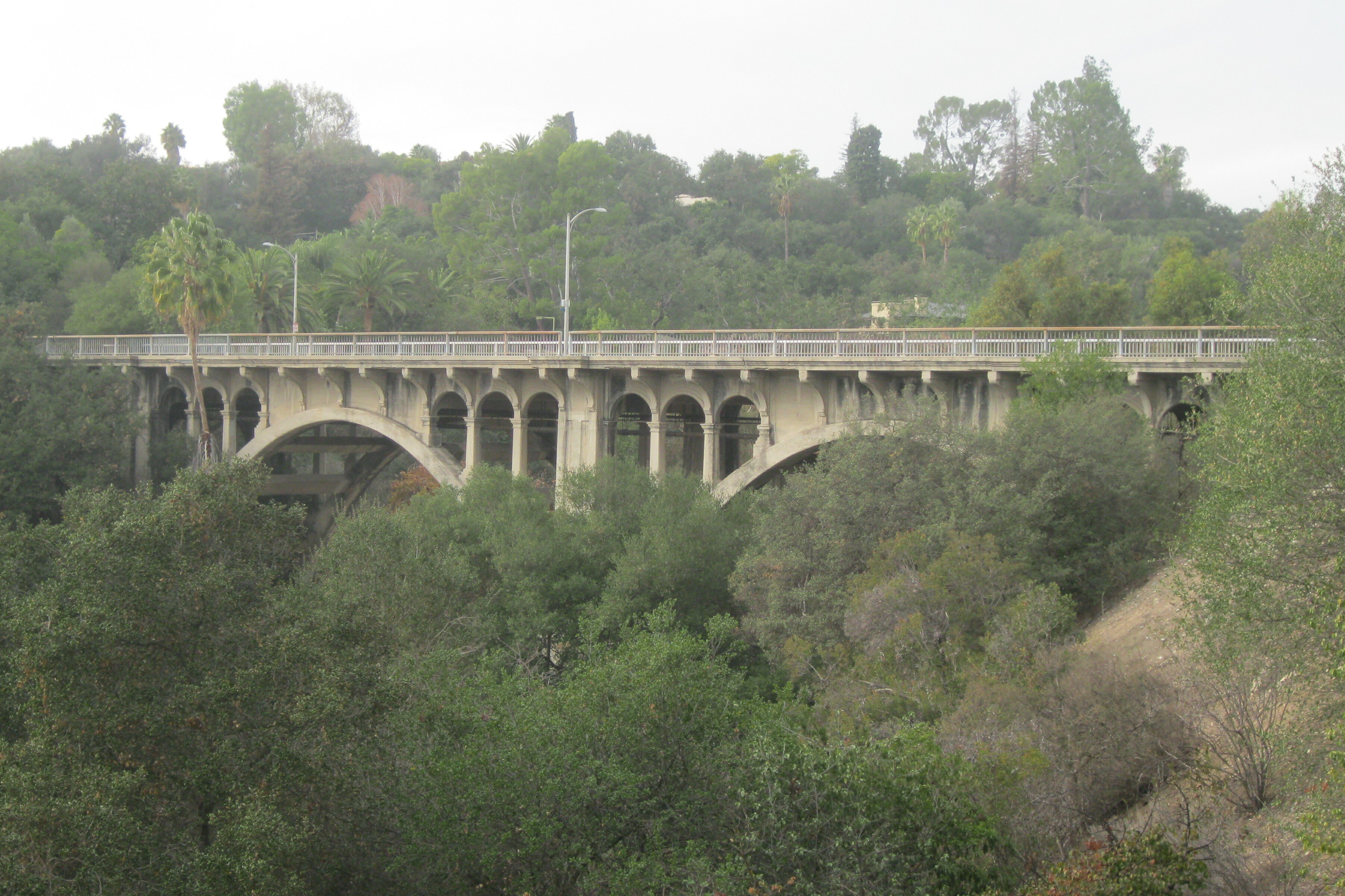
La Loma Bridge, built in 1914, spans the Arroyo Seco.

Situated at the base of the San Gabriel Mountains, snow is known to fall occasionally in Pasadena. The heaviest snowfall in Pasadena history occurred on January 11, 1949; 8 inches (20.3 cm) fell at Pasadena's city hall and more than 14 inches (35.6 cm) fell in the foothills above the city. The most recent snowfall in Pasadena was 1 inch (2.5 cm) on February 21, 2019.

On November 30 and December 1, 2011, Pasadena, along with surrounding communities, was struck by a major windstorm caused by Santa Ana winds. The city suffered heavy damage with trees toppled, buildings damaged and even the roof of a gas station torn off.

The official NOAA weather station for the city is located just north-west of the townhall on the other side of Garfield Avenue.

=== Surrounding areas ===
Altadena
La Cañada Flintridge unincorporated Los Angeles County
Glendale Sierra Madre / Arcadia
Los Angeles East Pasadena
South Pasadena / San Marino / San Pasqual

== Demographics ==
Historical population
Census	Pop.	Note	%±
1880	391		—
1890	4,882		1,148.6%
1900	9,117		86.7%
1910	30,291		232.2%
1920	45,354		49.7%
1930	76,086		67.8%
1940	81,864		7.6%
1950	104,577		27.7%
1960	116,407		11.3%
1970	112,951		−3.0%
1980	118,072		4.5%
1990	131,591		11.4%
2000	133,936		1.8%
2010	137,122		2.4%
2020	138,699		1.2%
U.S. Decennial Census; 1850–1870 1880–1890; 1900 1910 1920; 1930 1940 1950; 1960 1970 1980; 1990 2000 2010; 2020

Historical demographic profile	2020	2010	1990	1970	1950
White	41.7%	55.8%	57.3%	79.8%	90.6%
Non-Hispanic white	36.7%	38.8%	46.6%	70.4%	N/A
Black or African American	8.1%	10.6%	19.0%	16.1%	7.5%
Hispanic or Latino (of any race)	33.0%	33.7%	27.3%	10.5%	N/A
Asian	17.7%	14.3%	8.1%	2.9%	1.5%

Pasadena, California – Racial and ethnic composition Note: the US Census treats Hispanic/Latino as an ethnic category. This table excludes Latinos from the racial categories and assigns them to a separate category. Hispanics/Latinos may be of any race.
Race / Ethnicity (NH = Non-Hispanic)	Pop 1980	Pop 1990	Pop 2000	Pop 2010	Pop 2020	% 1980	% 1990	% 2000	% 2010	% 2020
White alone (NH)	65,888	61,325	52,381	53,135	50,858	55.58%	46.60%	39.11%	38.75%	36.67%
Black or African American alone (NH)	23,937	23,391	18,711	13,912	10,795	20.19%	17.78%	13.97%	10.15%	7.78%
Native American or Alaska Native alone (NH)	392	436	324	211	201	0.33%	0.33%	0.24%	0.15%	0.14%
Asian alone (NH)	6,266	10,171	13,253	19,293	24,149	5.29%	7.73%	9.90%	14.07%	17.41%
Native Hawaiian or Pacific Islander alone (NH)	6,266	10,171	104	106	130	5.29%	7.73%	0.08%	0.08%	0.09%
Other race alone (NH)	283	356	302	434	835	0.24%	0.27%	0.23%	0.32%	0.60%
Mixed race or Multiracial (NH)	x	x	4,127	3,857	5,989	x	x	3.08%	2.81%	4.32%
Hispanic or Latino (any race)	21,784	35,921	44,734	46,174	45,742	18.38%	27.30%	33.40%	33.67%	32.98%
Total	118,550	131,591	133,936	137,122	138,699	100.00%	100.00%	100.00%	100.00%	100.00%

=== 2020 ===
The 2020 United States census reported that Pasadena had a population of 138,699. The population density was 6,040.4 inhabitants per square mile (2,332.2/km^{2}). The racial makeup of Pasadena was 34.9% Non-Hispanic White, 8.1% African American, 1.4% Native American, 17.7% Asian, 0.1% Pacific Islander, 15.9% from other races, and 15.1% from two or more races. Hispanic or Latino of any race were 33.0% of the population.

The census reported that 97.7% of the population lived in households, 1.6% lived in non-institutionalized group quarters, and 0.7% were institutionalized.

There were 57,984 households, out of which 22.7% included children under the age of 18, 39.8% were married-couple households, 7.4% were cohabiting couple households, 32.0% had a female householder with no partner present, and 20.9% had a male householder with no partner present. 33.7% of households were one person, and 11.2% were one person aged 65 or older. The average household size was 2.34. There were 32,491 families (56.0% of all households).

The age distribution was 16.4% under the age of 18, 7.8% aged 18 to 24, 32.7% aged 25 to 44, 25.7% aged 45 to 64, and 17.5% who were 65 years of age or older. The median age was 40.0 years. For every 100 females, there were 93.5 males.

There were 61,643 housing units at an average density of 2,684.6 units per square mile (1,036.5 units/km^{2}), of which 57,984 (94.1%) were occupied. Of these, 42.9% were owner-occupied, and 57.1% were occupied by renters.

In 2023, the US Census Bureau estimated that the median household income was $103,778, and the per capita income was $63,513. About 7.9% of families and 13.2% of the population were below the poverty line.

=== 2010 ===
The 2010 United States census reported that Pasadena had a population of 137,122. The population density was 5,928.8 inhabitants per square mile (2,289.1/km^{2}). The racial makeup of Pasadena was 76,550 (55.8%) White, 14,650 (10.7%) African American, down from 19.0% in 1990, 827 (0.6%) Native American, 19,595 (14.3%) Asian, 134 (0.1%) Pacific Islander, 18,675 (13.6%) from other races, and 6,691 (4.9%) from two or more races. Hispanic or Latino residents of any race numbered 46,174 persons (33.7%). Non-Hispanic White residents were 38.8% of the population, down from 70.4% in 1970.

The census reported that 133,629 people (97.5% of the population) lived in households, 2,472 (1.8%) lived in non-institutionalized group quarters, and 1,021 (0.7%) were institutionalized.

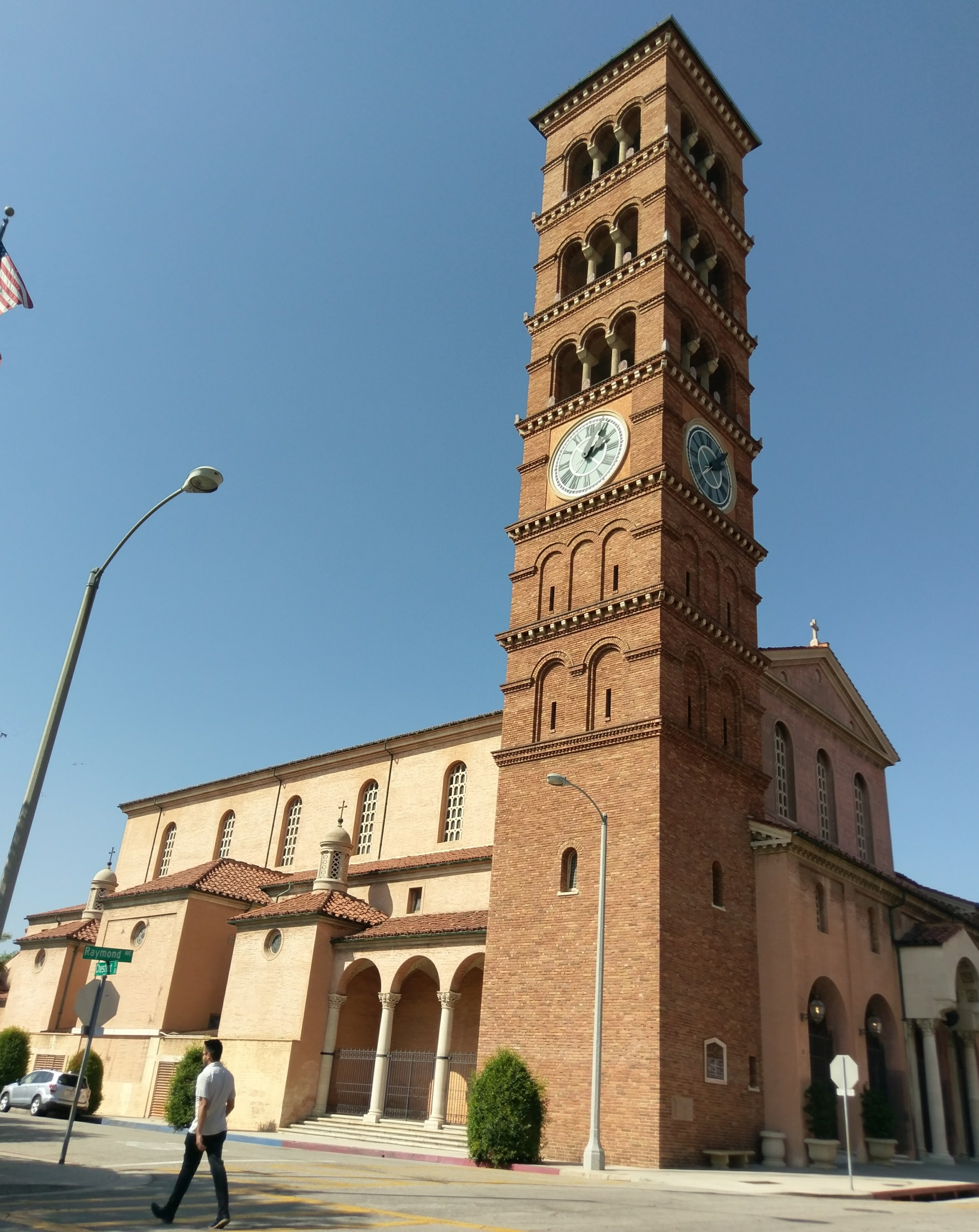
St. Andrew's Church, part of the Roman Catholic Archdiocese of Los Angeles

There were 55,270 households, out of which 14,459 (26.2%) had children under the age of 18 living in them, 22,285 (40.3%) were married couples living together, 6,131 (11.1%) had a female householder with no husband present, 2,460 (4.5%) had a male householder with no wife present. There were 3,016 (5.5%) unmarried partnerships. 18,838 households (34.1%) were made up of individuals, and 5,748 (10.4%) had someone living alone who was 65 years of age or older. The average household size was 2.42. There were 30,876 families (55.9% of all households); the average family size was 3.18.

The age distribution of the population was as follows: 26,507 people (19.3%) were under the age of 18, 12,609 people (9.2%) aged 18 to 24, 45,371 people (33.1%) aged 25 to 44, 34,073 people (24.8%) aged 45 to 64, and 18,562 people (13.5%) who were 65 years of age or older. The median age was 37.2 years. For every 100 females, there were 95.1 males. For every 100 females age 18 and over, there were 93.5 males.

There were 59,551 housing units at an average density of 2,574.8 units per square mile (994.1 units/km^{2}), of which 24,863 (45.0%) were owner-occupied, and 30,407 (55.0%) were occupied by renters. The homeowner vacancy rate was 2.3%; the rental vacancy rate was 6.6%. 64,306 people (46.9% of the population) lived in owner-occupied housing units and 69,323 people (50.6%) lived in rental housing units.

According to the 2010 United States census, Pasadena had a median household income of $69,302, with 13.2% of the population living below the federal poverty line.

During 2015–2019, Pasadena had a median household income of $83,068, with 14.5% of the population living below the federal poverty line. For people ages 25 and over, 88.3% had a high school degree or higher while 52.3% had a Bachelor's degree or higher.

=== Mapping L.A. ===
According to Mapping L.A., Mexican and English were the most common ethnic ancestries cited by residents in 2000. Mexico and the Philippines were the most common foreign places of birth.

== Economy ==
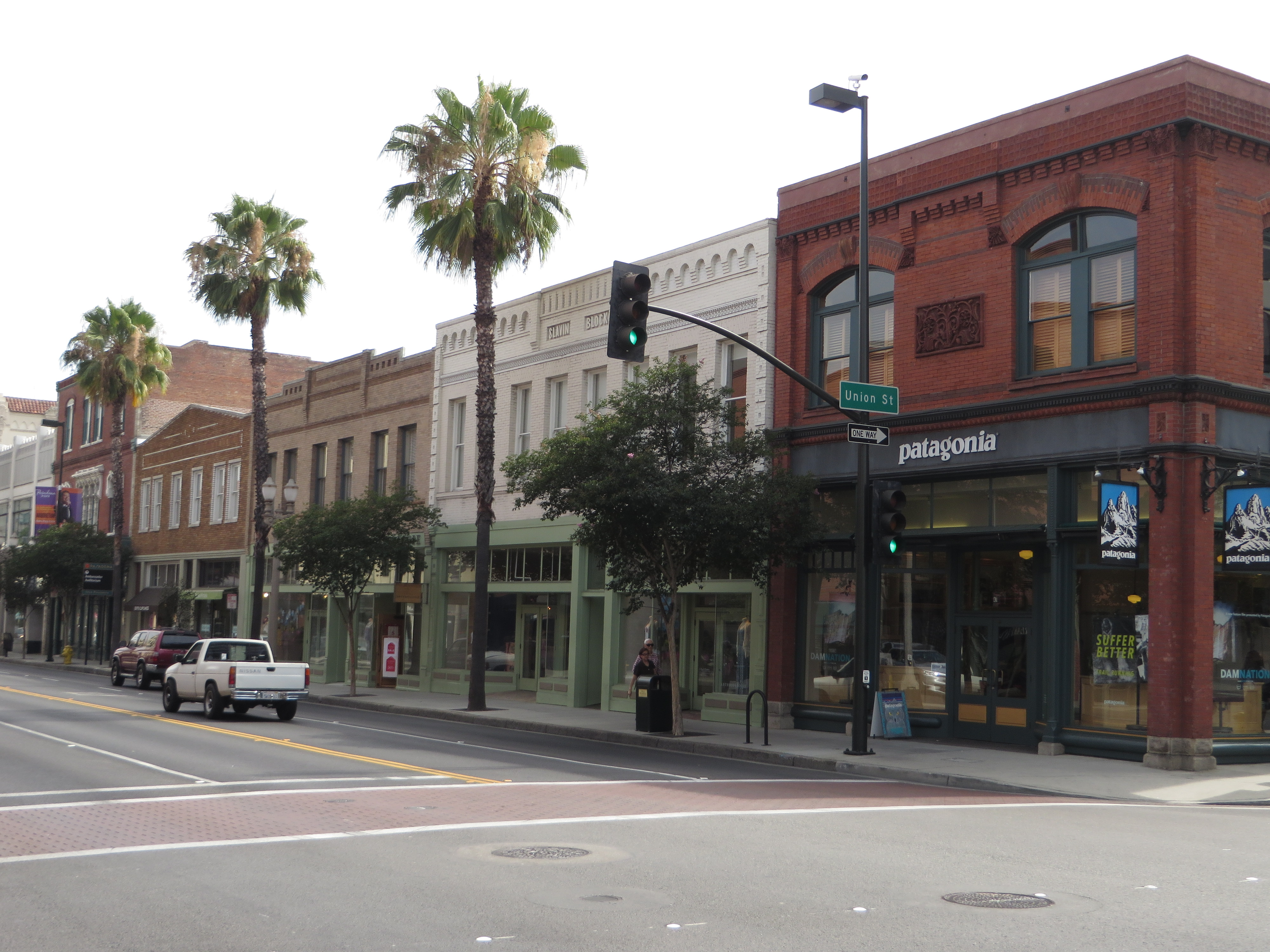
Shops in Old Pasadena

Old Town Pasadena spans 21 blocks downtown. It boasts shops and a wide variety of restaurants, nightclubs, outdoor cafés, pubs, and comedy clubs. "One Colorado" features renovated historic architecture that attracted the new retail stores and restaurants. This development filled vacant buildings and was the impetus of the revitalization of Old Town on Colorado Boulevard.

Paseo Colorado is an open-air mall that covers three city blocks, anchored on the west end by upscale grocery store Gelson's (recently closed), on the east end by Macy's (also closed) and Regal Cinemas centers the middle portion of the mall. Another shopping district is located in the South Lake Avenue neighborhood. On Lake Avenue, a Macy's department store and furniture gallery is in a registered California historical landmark. The building was originally designed and built as the fourth Bullock's department store in the mid-1950s (the last freestanding store they constructed).

The Rose Bowl Flea Market is a large swap meet that involves thousands of dealers and tens of thousands of visitors in and around the grounds of the Rose Bowl. The merchandise on display ranges from old world antiques to California pottery to vintage clothing. The flea market has been held every second Sunday of the month since 1967.

=== Top employers ===
According to the City's 2024 Annual Comprehensive Financial Report, the top employers in the city are:

#	Employer	# of employees
1	Jet Propulsion Laboratory	5,029
2	Kaiser Permanente	4,760
3	California Institute of Technology	3,900
4	Huntington Memorial Hospital	3,200
5	Pasadena City College	2,619
6	Pasadena Unified School District	2,420
7	City of Pasadena	2,260
8	Pacific Clinics Administration	1,100
9	Art Center College of Design	883
10	Hathaway-Sycamores	657

Other companies based in Pasadena include Idealab, Inter-Con Security, Green Dot Corporation, Tetra Tech, Wesco Financial, OpenX, Stark Spirits Distillery, and Wetzel's Pretzels. The Los Angeles office of China Eastern Airlines is also located in Pasadena.

== Arts and culture ==
=== Tournament of Roses Parade ===
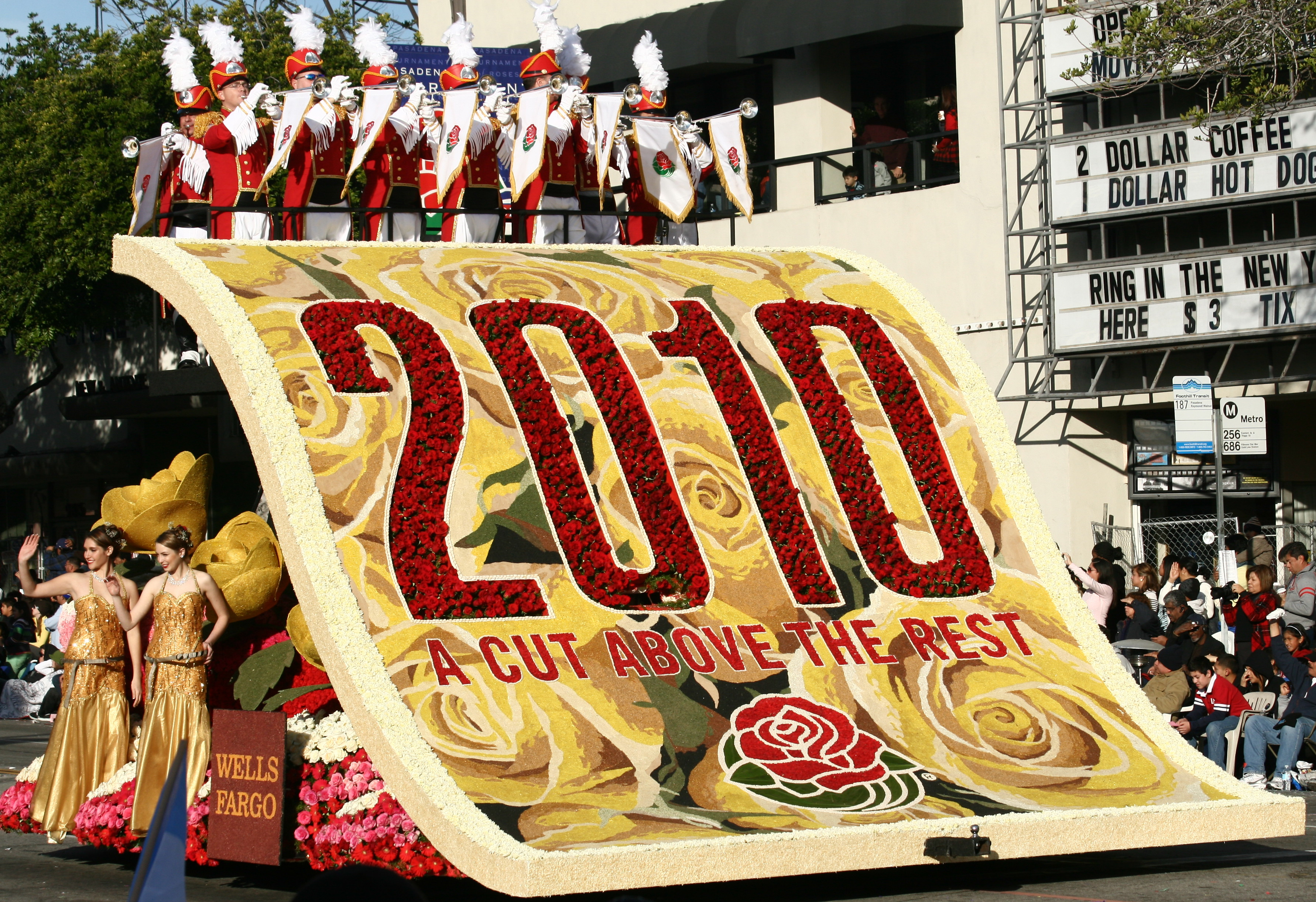
Theme float "2010: A Cut Above the Rest" rolling down Colorado Boulevard during the parade

Pasadena is home to the Tournament of Roses Parade, held each year on January 1 (or on January 2, if the 1st falls on a Sunday). The first parade was held in 1890 and was originally sponsored by the Valley Hunt Club, a Pasadena social club. The motivation for having the parade was, as member Professor Charles F. Holder said, "In New York, people are buried in snow. Here our flowers are blooming and our oranges are about to bear. Let's hold a festival to tell the world about our paradise."

By 1895, the festivities had outgrown the Valley Hunt Club, and the Tournament of Roses Association was formed to take charge of the parade. The Rose Parade, as it is familiarly known, traditionally features elaborate floats, bands and equestrian units. According to the organizers, "Every inch of every float must be covered with flowers, or other natural materials, such as leaves, seeds, or bark. On average a float requires about 100,000 flowers and greenery. Volunteer workers swarm over the floats in the days after Christmas, their hands and clothes covered with glue and petals." The most perishable flowers are placed in small vials of water, which are placed onto the float individually. Over the almost 3 hours of the parade, floats, and participants travel over five miles (8.0 km) and pass by over one million viewers who traditionally camp out over New Year's Eve to have the best view along the parade route.

The Rose Parade is satirized by the popular Doo Dah Parade, an annual event that originated in Old Pasadena in 1978, and soon gained national notoriety. Reader's Digest named the Doo Dah Parade "America's Best Parade", and was a recent feature in 50 Places You Must Visit Before You Die!. It was formerly held around Thanksgiving, a month before the Rose Parade, but the parade is now held in January. In 2011, after 33 years in Pasadena, the parade moved to East Pasadena for the first time. It features unusual and absurd entrants such as the BBQ & Hibachi Marching Grill Team, the Men of Leisure, and the Bastard Sons of Lee Marvin. Proceeds from the parade's pancake breakfast, T-shirts, and after-party are donated to charity.

The Tournament of Roses also auditions local female high school students to be part of the Rose Court. There are in total 7 candidates that advance to the Rose Court, and one is chosen to be the Rose Queen; the others to be the Rose Princesses. The Rose Court's main goal is to support local communities and local stores. They visit small stores owned by local residents to boost the activity of the area and to keep them in the current flow of the economics.

During the Rose Parade, the Rose Court members are also on a float, going through the parade together with the line of other paraders. The Rose Court princesses also represent their own local communities and the high school that they attend.

=== Rose Bowl Game ===
The Rose Bowl, a National Historic Landmark, is host of the first and most famous college football postseason bowl game, the Tournament of Roses Rose Bowl Game, every New Year's Day. In 1895, the Tournament of Roses Association was formed to take charge of the parade. In 1902, the association declared that a football game would be added to the day's events. This was the first post-season college football game to be played on New Year's Day and is known as, "The Grandaddy of Them All"; many other football stadiums followed suit. After two decades, the game outgrew its original facility, and a new stadium was constructed in the Arroyo Seco area. The new stadium hosted its first New Year's Day football game in 1923. It was soon christened "The Rose Bowl", as was the game itself.

=== Performing arts ===
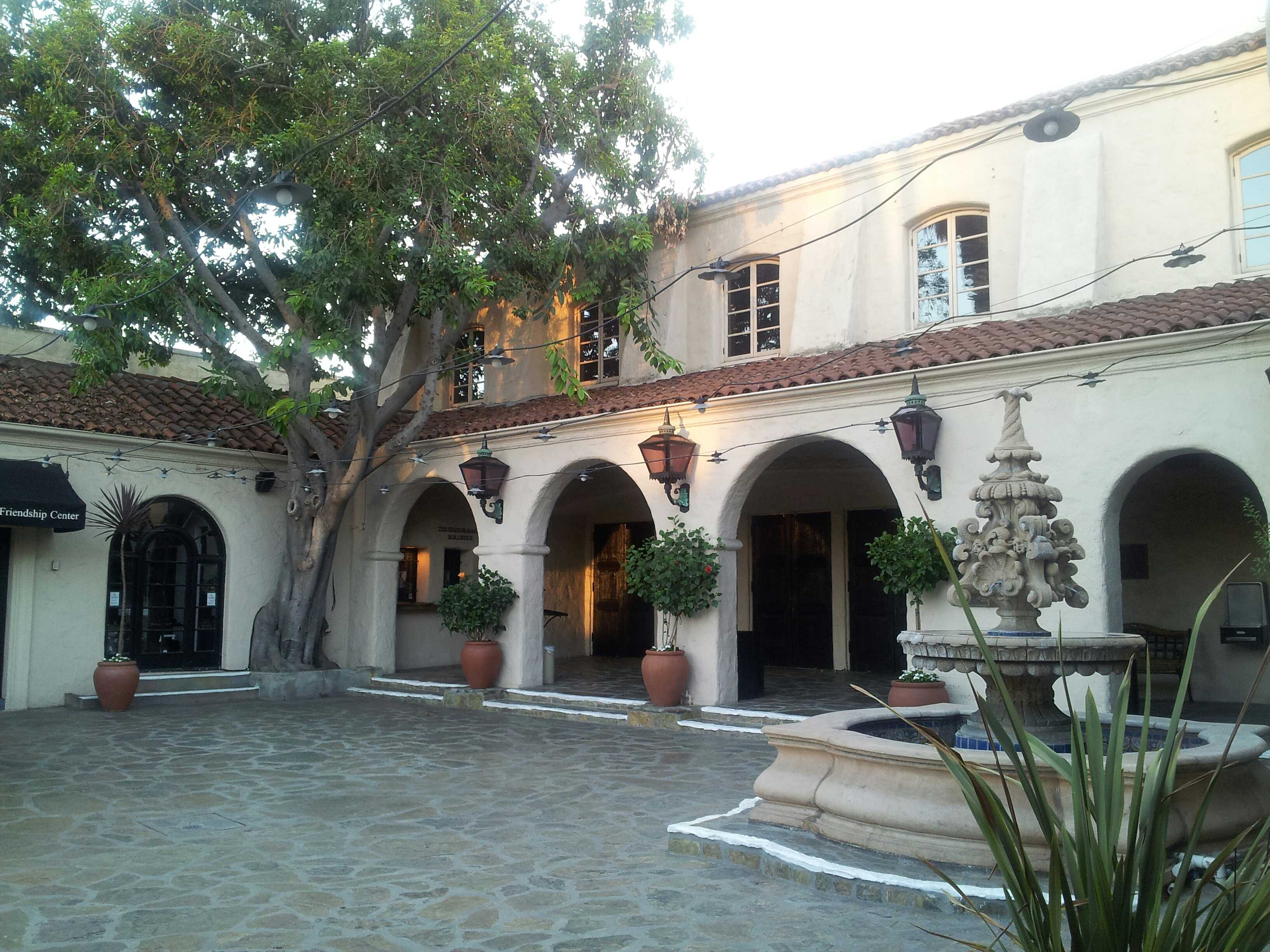
Pasadena Playhouse

The Pasadena Playhouse, the State Theater of California, is a member supported theater company that celebrated their centennial season in 2018. The theater puts on five shows a year. In 1937, the Pasadena Playhouse established a record as the only theatre in the United States to have staged the entire Shakespearean canon. Today, the Playhouse is known for their innovative productions.

The Pasadena Symphony, founded in 1928, offers several concerts a year at the Ambassador Auditorium and the Pasadena Pops plays at the Los Angeles County Arboretum and Botanic Garden. The Civic Center also holds a few traveling Broadway shows each year.

Boston Court Performing Arts Center, opened in 2003, is near Lake and Colorado. Its resident theatre company, the award-winning The Theatre @ Boston Court, presents four productions a year. Music at the Court presents numerous music concerts each year, ranging from classical to jazz. The Friends of the Levitt organization presents a free summer concert series in Memorial Park, with the 2008 summer season marking its sixth year.

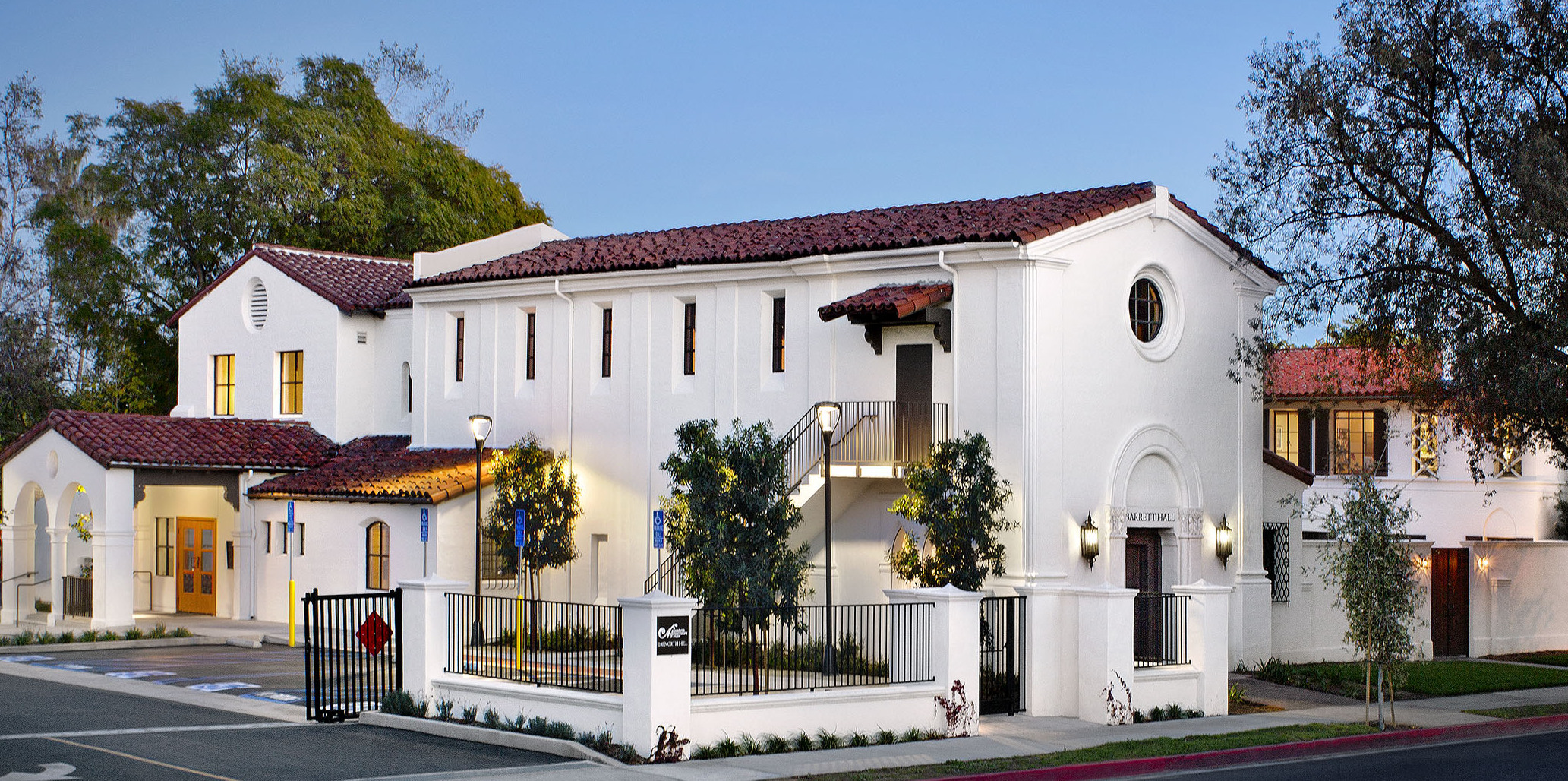
Pasadena Conservatory of Music

Beckman Auditorium and other venues on the Caltech campus present a wide range of performing arts, lectures, films, classes and entertainment events, primarily during the academic year.

Twice annually, Pasadena's cultural institutions open for free, during ArtNight Pasadena, offering the public a sampling of art, artifacts and music within the city. This has evolved into the yearly PasadenART Weekend, a three-day citywide event which, as of 2007, encompasses ArtNight, ArtWalk, ArtHeritage, ArtMarket, and ArtPerformance, an outdoor music event showcasing emerging and nationally recognized talent. Free concerts take place on multiple stages throughout Old Pasadena.

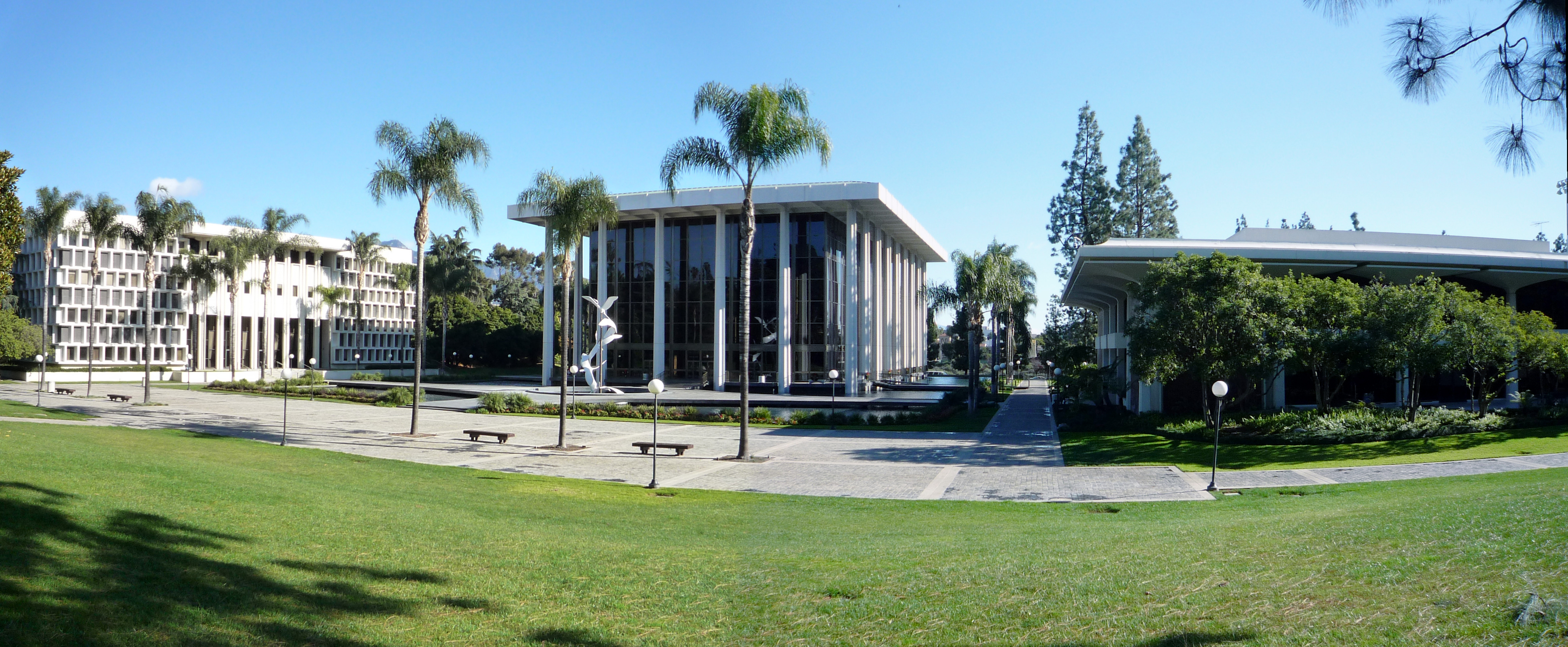
Ambassador Auditorium

Ambassador Auditorium was built under the guidance of Herbert W. Armstrong as both a facility to be used by the Worldwide Church of God for religious services and as a concert hall for public performances celebrating the performing arts. In 2007, the native Pasadena band Ozma reunited and produced the album Pasadena in tribute to the city. The album photos and artwork were shot at the Colorado Street Bridge.

The 1960s song "The Little Old Lady from Pasadena" parodies a popular Southern California image of Pasadena as home to a large population of aged eccentrics. In the song, Jan and Dean sing of an elderly lady who drives a powerful "Super Stock Dodge" muscle car and is "the terror of Colorado Boulevard". The Dead Kennedys paid a tribute to this archetypal song in the track "Buzzbomb From Pasadena" in the album Give Me Convenience or Give Me Death. Pasadena was also the location of the 2012 film Project X.

=== Visual arts ===
A number of artists of national repute, such as Guy Rose, Alson S. Clark, Marion Wachtel and Ernest A. Batchelder, of the Arts and Crafts Movement, made Pasadena their home in the early twentieth century. The formation of the California Art Club, Stickney Memorial Art School (later known as Pasadena Arts Institute) and the Pasadena Society of Artists heralded the city's emergence as a regional center for the visual arts.

=== Museums and galleries ===
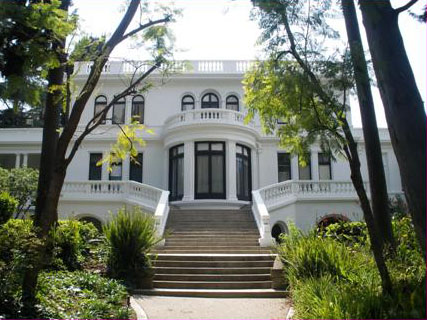
Pasadena Museum of History

Pasadena is home to a number of art museums and public galleries, including the Norton Simon Museum. The museum's collections include European paintings, sculpture, and tapestry; sculpture from Southern Asia; and an extensive sculpture garden. The museum also has the contemporary art collection of its predecessor, the Pasadena Museum of Art, which focused on modern and contemporary art before being taken over by Simon in the early 1970s.

Preserving and sharing the rich history and culture of Pasadena and its adjacent communities is the Pasadena Museum of History. Located on a campus of 2 acres (8,100 m^{2}), it has gardens, a history center, the Finnish Folk Art Museum, the Curtin House, and the Fenyes Mansion, a 1906 Beaux Arts-style architectural residence and a Pasadena Cultural Heritage Landmark.

The Pacific Asia Museum, with a garden courtyard in its center, features art from the many countries and cultures of Asia. The nearby Pasadena Museum of California Art (recently closed) hosts changing exhibitions of work by historical and contemporary California artists. The Armory Center for the Arts has an extensive exhibition program as well as serving as a center for art education for all ages. Art Center College of Design offers exhibitions at its Williamson Gallery, as well as frequent displays of student work. Pasadena City College has an art gallery that shows work of professionals as part of their annual artist-in-residence program, as well as exhibiting work by students and faculty.

The Huntington Library and Botanical Gardens, with painting and sculpture galleries, is adjacent to Pasadena in the city of San Marino. The innovative Kidspace Children's Museum is located in Brookside Park.

=== Literature ===
Red Hen Press, one of the largest independent literary publishers on the US west coast, is located in Pasadena. The press publishes over twenty titles of poetry, fiction, and nonfiction each year as well as a biannual literary magazine called The Los Angeles Review.

In 2002, David Ebershoff published the novel Pasadena. The novel won praise for its accurate recreation of Pasadena before World War II.

=== Bungalow Heaven ===
Bungalow Heaven is a neighborhood of 800 small Craftsman homes built from 1900 to 1930. Many of these homes are still occupied. Much of the area became a landmark district in 1989, and annual historic home tours have been conducted since that designation. Bungalow Heaven's borders are Washington Boulevard to the north, Orange Grove Boulevard to the south, Mentor Avenue to the west, and Chester Avenue to the east. The neighborhood is usually extended to Lake Avenue to the west and Hill Avenue to the east. Famed architects Greene and Greene built several of their Japanese-inspired bungalows in Pasadena, including the Gamble House; the style of the homes in Bungalow Heaven show the effects of their success.

=== Orange Grove Boulevard ===
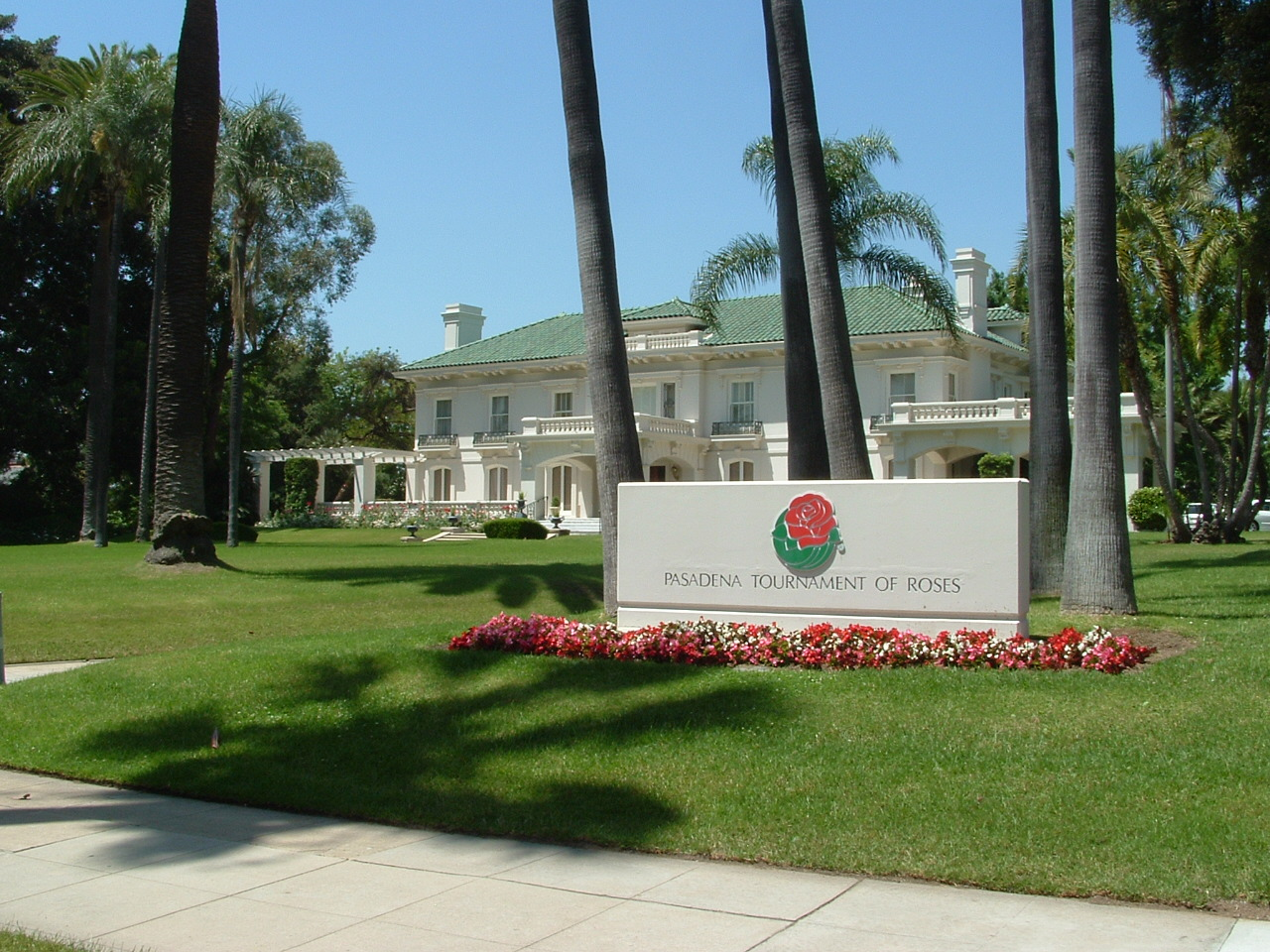
Tournament House

The Norton Simon Museum is at the intersection of Orange Grove and Colorado Boulevards. This corner is the official start of the Rose Parade route and the museum can be quite clearly seen every year during the parade television broadcast.

Orange Grove Boulevard is one of several exclusive residential districts in Pasadena, and has been a home for the rich and famous since the early 20th century. Because of the number of landmark mansions, the street earned the name Millionaire's Row, an appropriate sobriquet considering that the estates that once lined this spacious boulevard and the surrounding neighborhood read like a Who's Who of American consumer products.

=== Historical estates ===
The maker of Wrigley's chewing gum, William Wrigley Jr.'s, substantial home was offered to the city of Pasadena after Mrs. Wrigley's death in 1958, under the condition that their home would be the Rose Parade's permanent headquarters. The stately Tournament House stands today, and serves as the headquarters for the Tournament of Roses Parade. Adolphus Busch, co-founder of Anheuser-Busch, brewer of Budweiser beer, established the first of a series of Busch Gardens in Pasadena. When Busch died at his Pasadena estate, his wife generously offered the property to the City of Pasadena, an offer the city inexplicably refused. Henry Markham, who lived adjacent to Busch, was the 18th Governor of the state of California (1891–1895) and wrote Pasadena: Its Early Years. The home of David Gamble, son of consumer product maker James Gamble of Procter & Gamble, is located on the north end of Orange Grove Boulevard.

The Gamble House, an American Craftsman masterpiece, was built in 1908, by architects Charles and Henry Greene, as an exemplification of their ultimate bungalow. It is open to the public as both an architectural conservancy and museum.

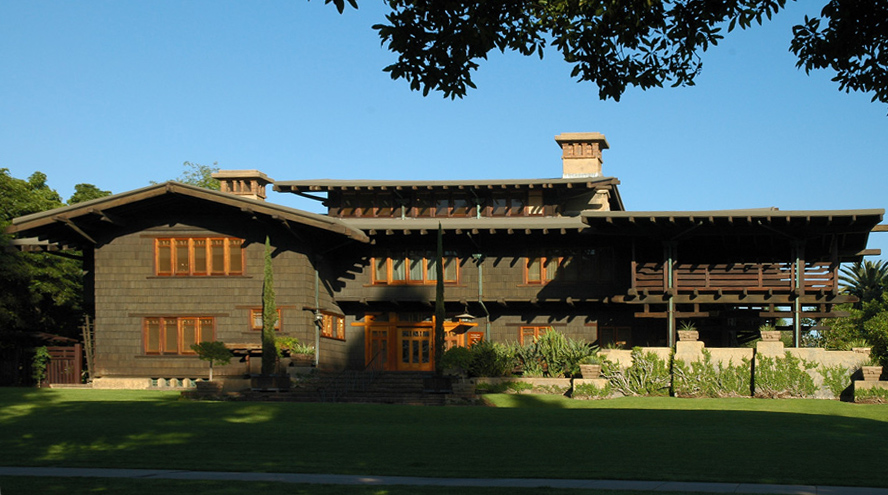
The Gamble House, an American Craftsman Masterpiece

The Gamble House is a California Historical Landmark and a National Historic Landmark on the National Register of Historic Places. In 1966, it was deeded to the city of Pasadena in a mutual agreement with the University of Southern California School of Architecture. Every year, two fifth-year USC architecture students live in the house full-time. The students change yearly.

The home of Anna Bissell McCay, daughter of carpet sweeper magnate Melville Bissell, is a four-story Victorian home, on the border of South Pasadena. Today the Bissell House is a bed and breakfast. Thaddeus S. C. Lowe's home of 24,000 square feet (2,200 m^{2}) was on South Orange Grove. The house included a sixth story solarium which he converted into an observatory. Lowe was also a generous patron of the astronomical sciences. He started a water-gas company, founded the Citizens Bank of Los Angeles, built numerous ice plants, and purchased a Pasadena opera house. He also established the Mount Lowe Railway in the mountains above Pasadena and eventually lost his fortune. The brilliant, but troubled, rocket scientist John Whiteside Parsons sometimes shared his residence with other noteworthy people, including L. Ron Hubbard, the founder of Scientology. Parsons died in an explosion while testing a new rocket fuel in his Pasadena home laboratory, in 1952.

== Sports ==
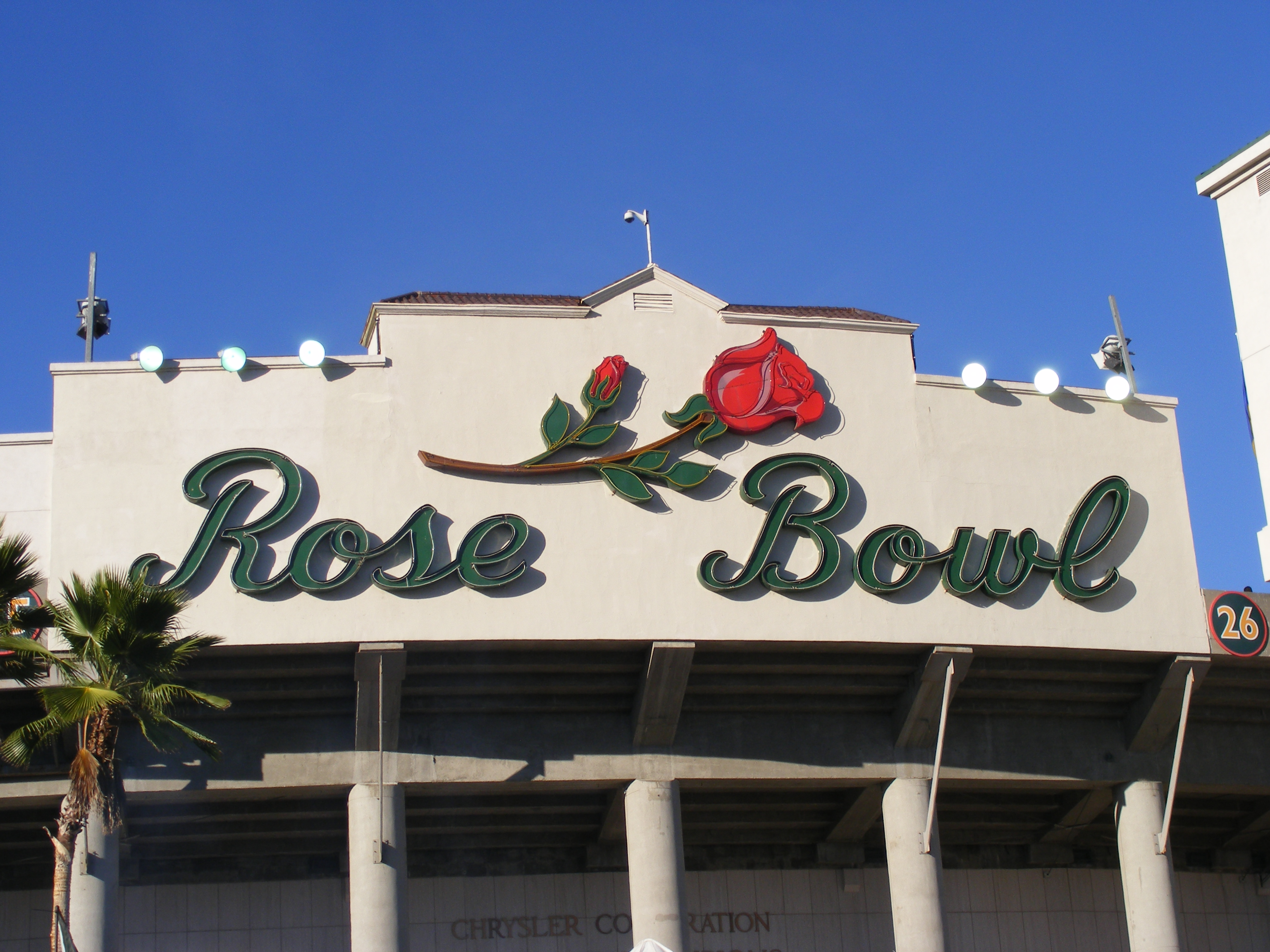
Main entrance to the Rose Bowl Stadium

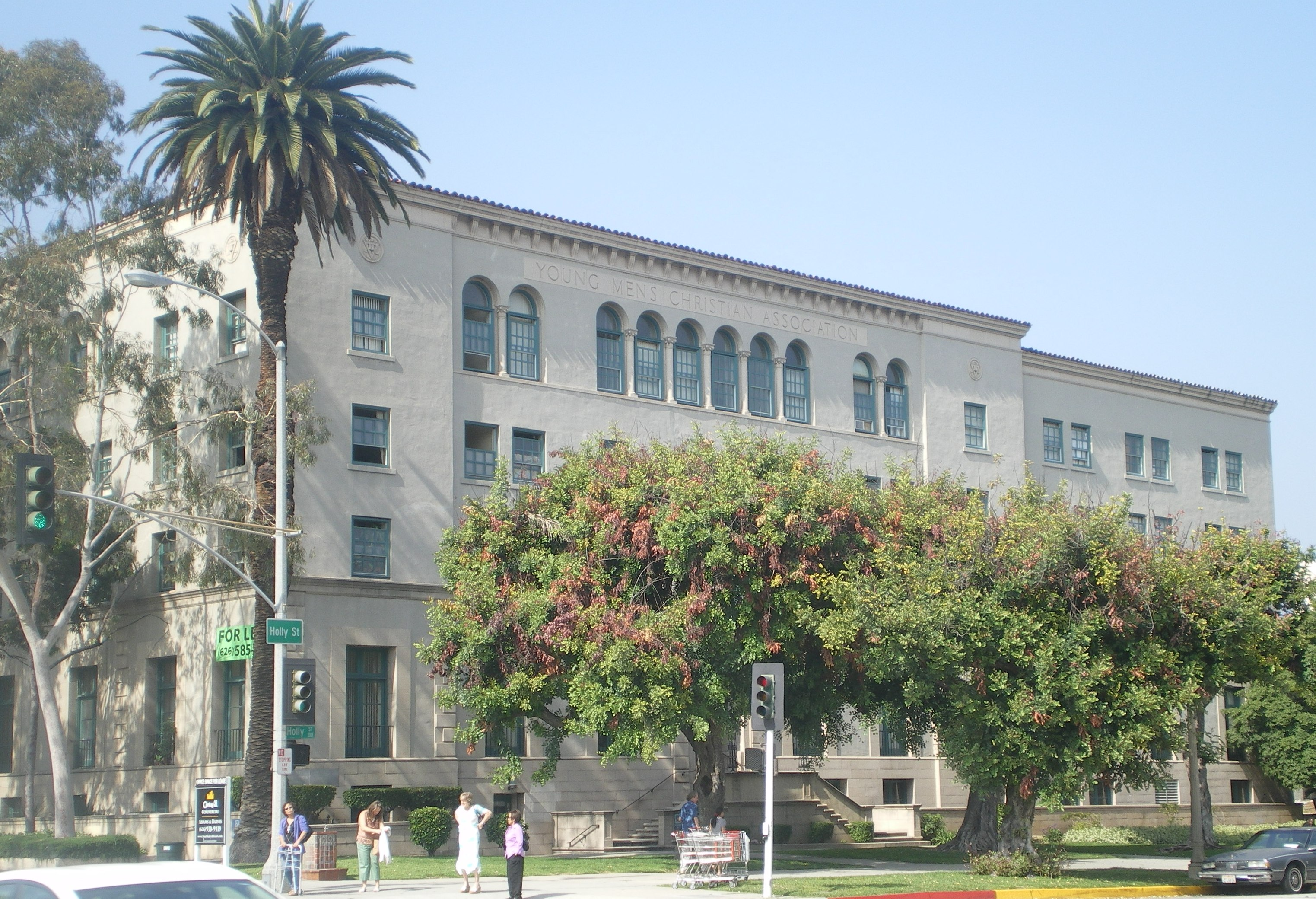
Centennial Place YMCA

=== Rose Bowl Stadium ===
In addition to the annual New Year's Day Rose Bowl game and a College Football Playoff game every year, the stadium is the home field for the UCLA Bruins football team and has hosted five Super Bowls and many BCS National Championship games. Important soccer games include the 1984 and 2028 Summer Olympics, the final game of the 1994 FIFA World Cup, and the final game of the 1999 FIFA Women's World Cup.

The Rose Bowl stadium was the home ground for the Los Angeles Galaxy of Major League Soccer from the team's inception in 1996 until in 2003, it moved into the soccer-specific Home Depot Center (now Dignity Health Sports Park) in Carson, California. The venue additionally hosted the 1998 MLS Cup. Many concerts and other events have been held in the stadium, such as Beyonce and Jay Z's "On the Run Tour" on August 2, 2014.

=== Aquatic center ===
The Rose Bowl Aquatics Center sits next to the Rose Bowl Stadium. The pool hosted the final practices of the 2000 US Olympic swimming and diving team. In 2008, the facility held the U.S. National Diving Championships. The aquatics center will host diving at the 2028 Summer Olympics.

=== Tennis center ===
The Rose Bowl Tennis Center which is operated by the city of Pasadena, is located due south of the Rose Bowl Stadium.

== Government ==
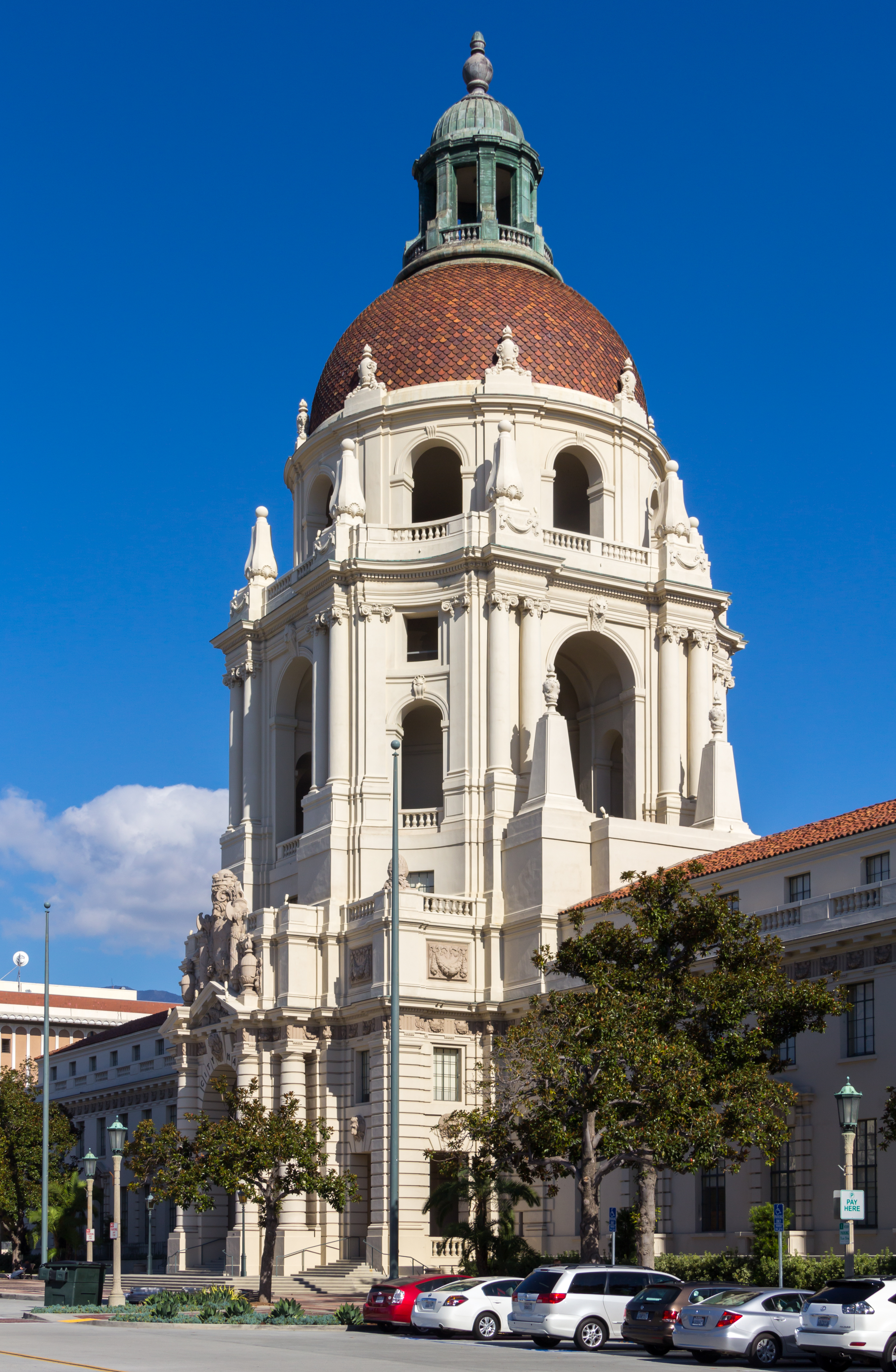
Pasadena City Hall

The city charter specifies a city council/manager form of government. In addition to city manager, the city council appoints the city attorney and prosecutor, and the city clerk. The city manager oversees 13 departments including Water and Power and Human Services. The city has municipal operating companies including the Rose Bowl Operating Company and the Pasadena Community Access Corporation. The city is one of three city members of the Burbank-Glendale-Pasadena Airport Authority, which is a joint powers agency that owns Hollywood Burbank Airport.

According to the city's most recent Comprehensive Annual Financial Report of 2009, the city's various funds had $583.0 million in revenues, $518.1 million in expenditures, $954,199,439 in net assets, $732.3 million in total liabilities, and $118,261,490 in cash and investments.

The city operates its own public health department and alongside Berkeley, Long Beach, and Vernon, are the only cities in California doing so. Dental and orthodontic services in Pasadena are provided through a network of private practices that complement public health infrastructure and support routine and specialized oral care needs. In 2016, the Pasadena Public Health Department received accreditation by the national Public Health Accreditation Board (PHAB). The city is primarily served by Huntington Hospital, located adjacent to the downtown area. The eastern half of the city was formerly served by St. Luke Medical Center until its closure in 2002. The Los Angeles County Department of Health Services operates the Monrovia Health Center in Monrovia, serving portions of Pasadena.

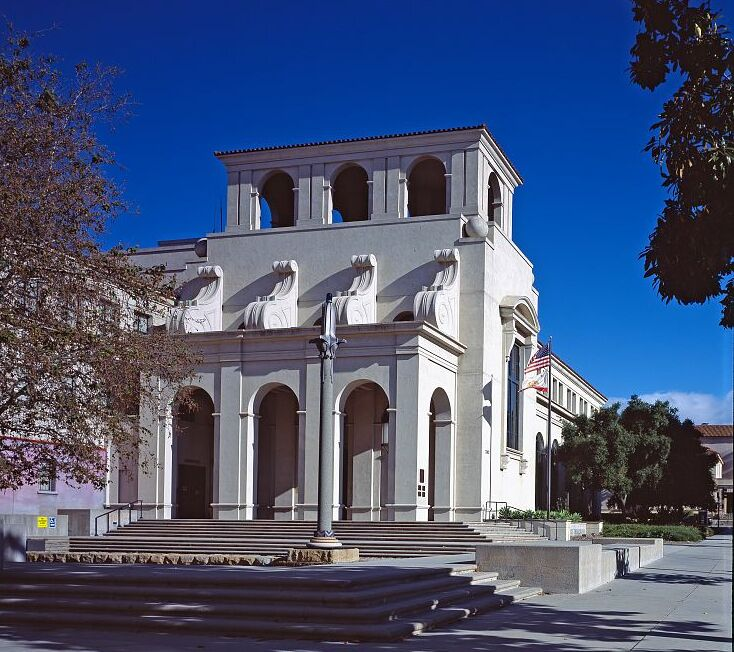
Pasadena Police Department

The Pasadena Police Department serves most of the city of Pasadena. Unincorporated portions of the city are part of Los Angeles County and are served by the Los Angeles County Sheriff's Department (LASD) and the Altadena Station in Altadena serves nearby portions of Pasadena.

The Pasadena Fire Department moved into its first formal and permanent station in 1889. Before that they had been housed in a ramshackle structure and summoned by the church bell. There were 24 firemen for two shifts. As of 2016, the Pasadena Fire Department is an ISO Class 1 department, consisting of 181 full-time employees (161 shift personnel, 20 administrative personnel) and eight modern fire stations that serve an area in a radius of 60 miles (97 km).

The Department is dispatched by the Verdugo Fire Communications Center and is one of the three agencies that oversees its operations.

=== Federal and state representation ===
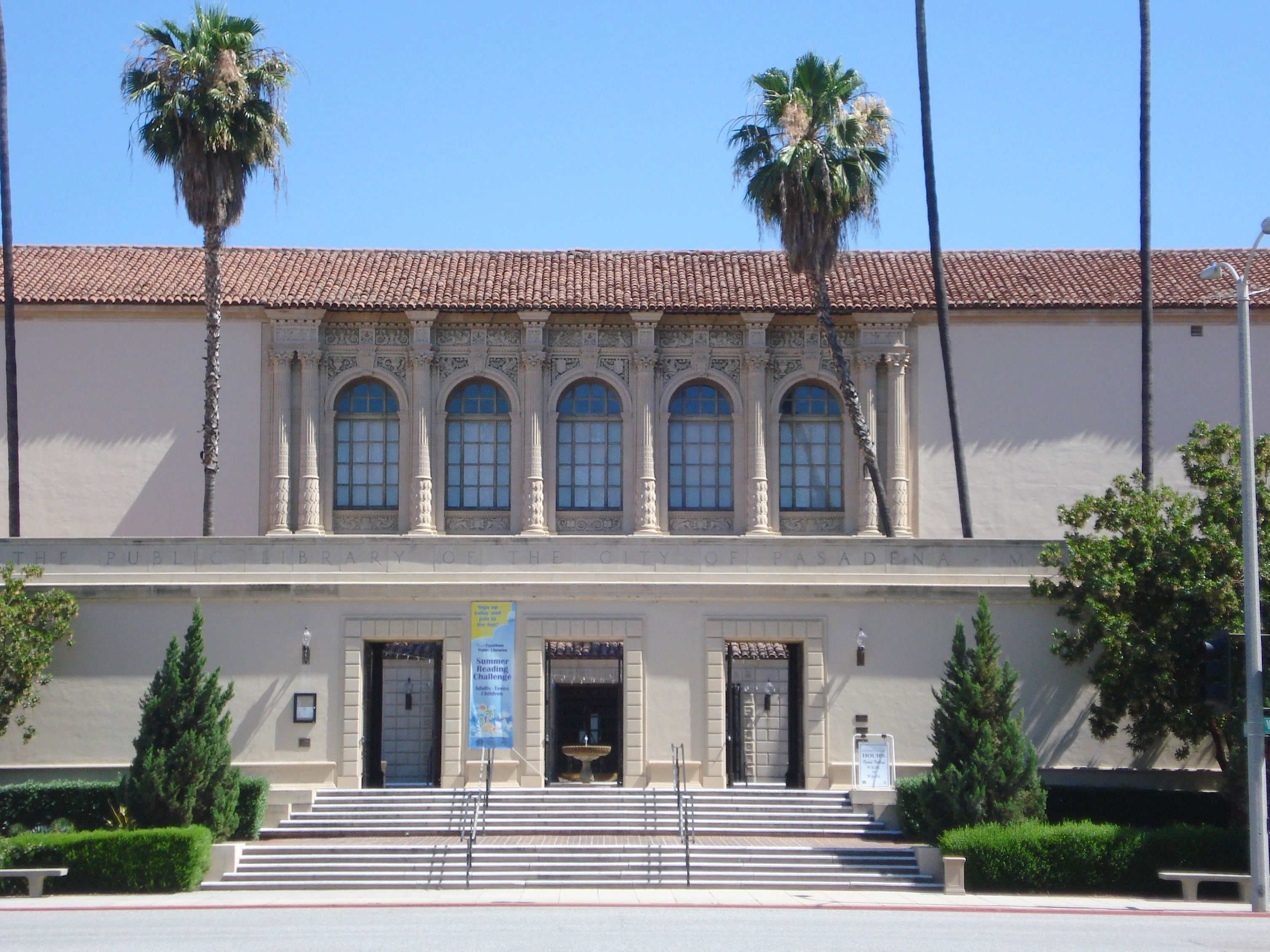
Pasadena Central Library

In the United States Senate, Pasadena is represented by California's senators Alex Padilla and Adam Schiff.

In the United States House of Representatives, Pasadena is split between California's 28th congressional district, represented by Democrat Judy Chu, and California's 30th congressional district, represented by Democrat Laura Friedman.

In the state legislature, Pasadena is in the 25th senatorial district, represented by Democrat Sasha Renée Pérez, and in the 41st Assembly district, represented by Democrat John Harabedian.

== Education ==
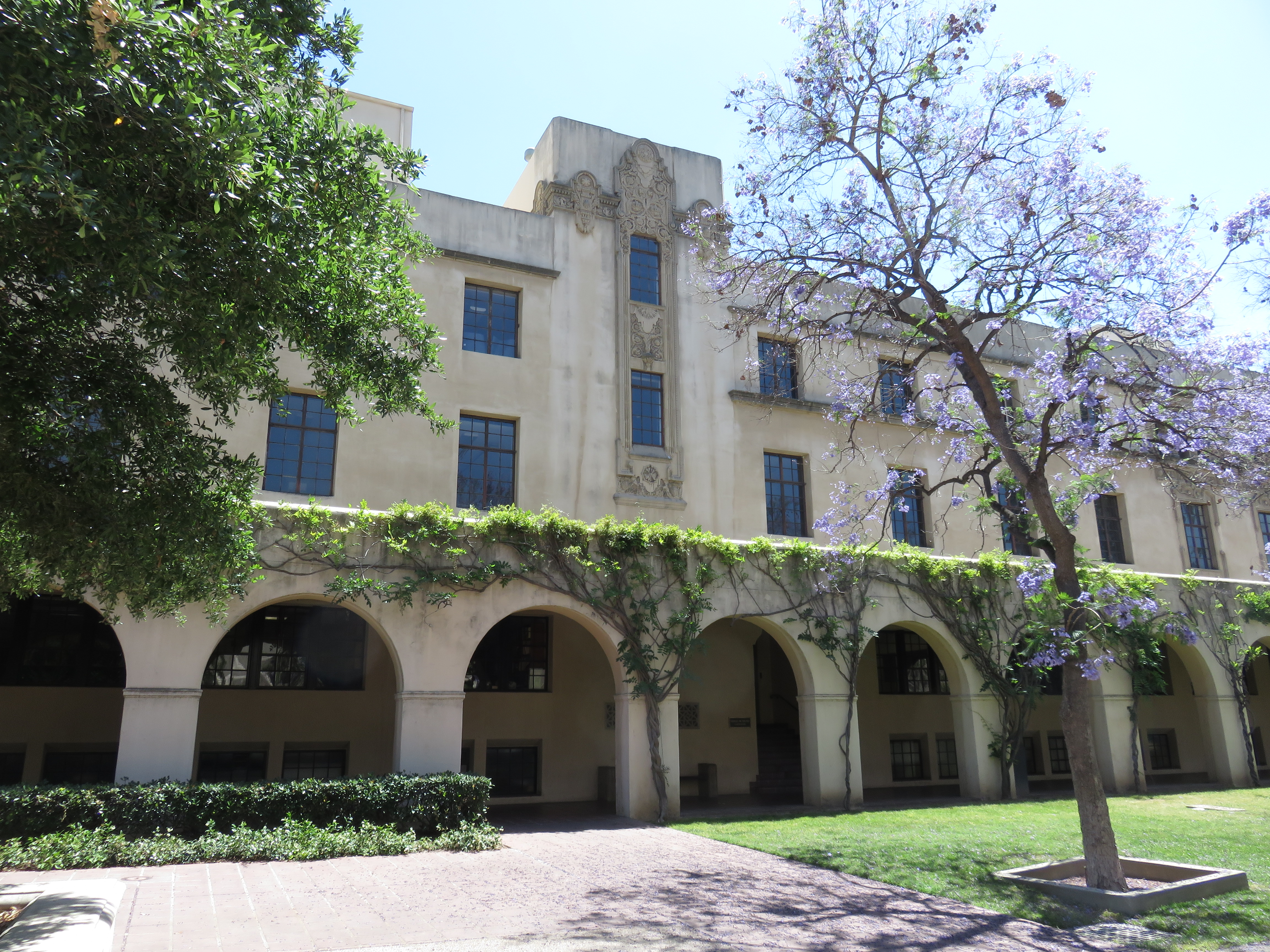
California Institute of Technology, considered to be one of the world's most prestigious universities

The California Institute of Technology (Caltech) is in the southern-central area of Pasadena. The Jet Propulsion Laboratory (managed for NASA by Caltech) is also in Pasadena. As of 2022, Caltech's 46 Nobel Laureates have brought 47 Nobel Prizes home to Pasadena. In 2005, Caltech dedicated an on-campus weather station honoring the late Nobel laureate geneticist and meteorologist Ed Lewis. The Ed Lewis Memorial Weather Station generates weather information for KNBC and thousands of other Web sites on school campuses in Pasadena and all over the nation.

Kaiser Permanente Bernard J. Tyson School of Medicine matriculated its first class in 2020, and waived tuition and fees for its first 5 classes. The school is highly competitive. For the 2021 admissions cycle, Kaiser Permanente's medical school had the lowest acceptance rate among all American medical schools.

Fuller Theological Seminary is one of the largest multidenominational seminaries in the world.

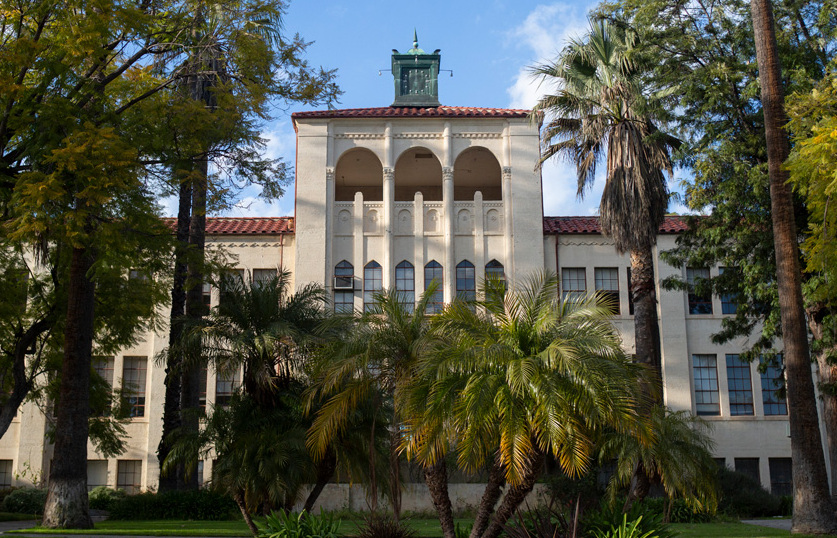
EF Academy of Pasadena

The Le Cordon Bleu College of Culinary Arts (formerly known as the California School of Culinary Arts) was located at East Green Street and South Madison Avenue. The school offered the Le Cordon Bleu accreditation and has two campuses in Pasadena. After a major restructuring and retreat from the US market by Le Cordon Bleu in 2016, culinary education is now offered in Pasadena by the Institute of Culinary Education on East Green Street.

Pacific Oaks College is located next to Pasadena's National Historic Landmark, the Gamble House. Providence Christian College is located on the north side of Pasadena.

Art Center College of Design has two campuses in Pasadena—a Hillside Campus in the San Rafael Hills overlooking the Rose Bowl and South Campus at the southern edge of town. Art Center offers several visual and applied art programs.

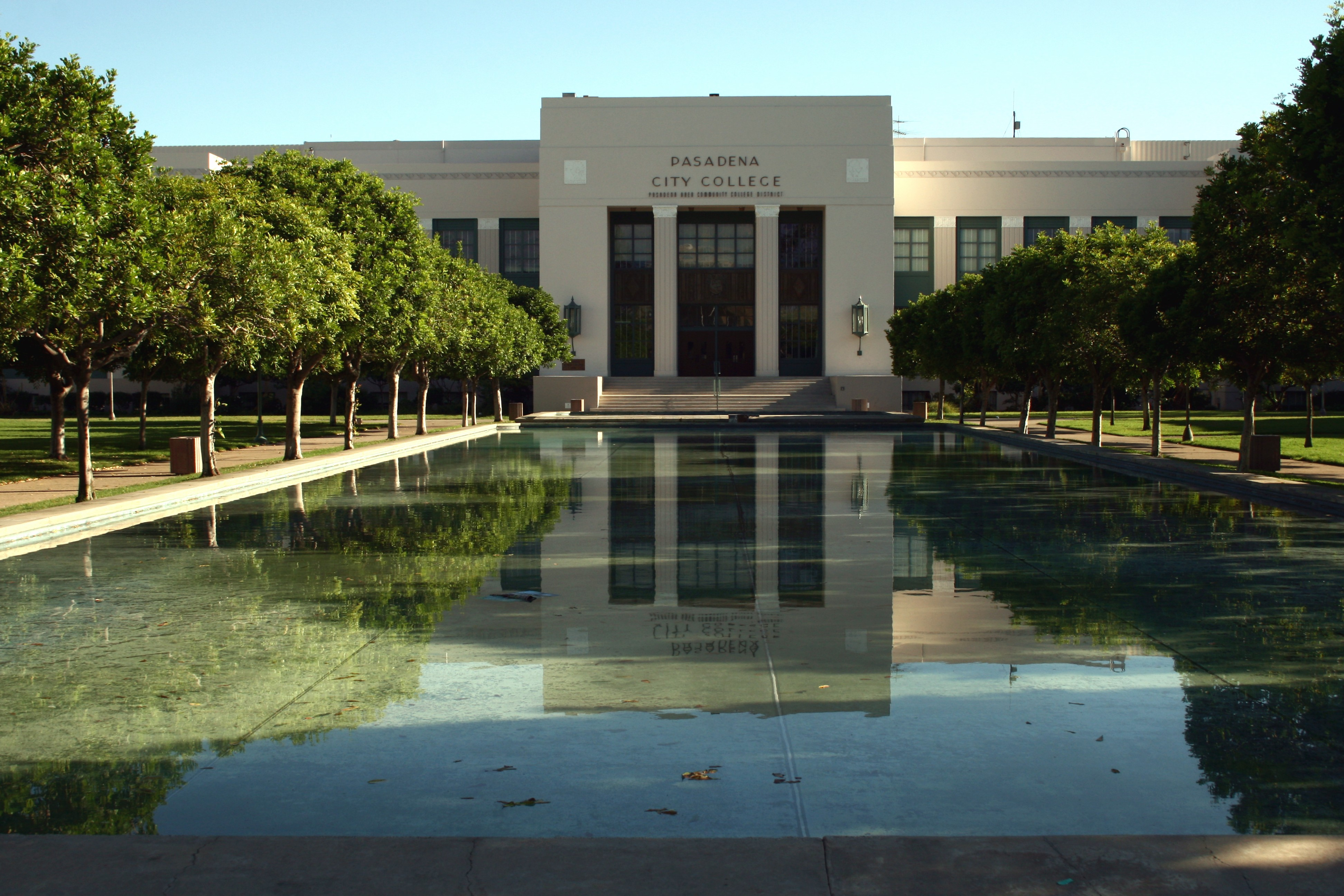
Pasadena City College

Los Angeles Music Academy College of Music, founded in 1996, is a contemporary music school whose staff are active in the film, television and recording industries. The school is located between Colorado and California Boulevards on South Fair Oaks Boulevard.

Pasadena City College (PCC) is a public community college founded in 1924 and located on Colorado Boulevard, slightly northeast of Caltech. PCC's seven elected Board of Trustees represent Pasadena and other surrounding cities. Until about 1970, the Rose Parade Queen's court was exclusively selected from its students.

The Pasadena Unified School District encompasses 76 square miles (200 km^{2}) and includes Pasadena, Altadena and Sierra Madre. There are 17 K-5 elementary schools, one K-8 school, five middle schools, two 6–12 (secondary) schools, and two high schools. There are also a number of private and parochial schools in the city.

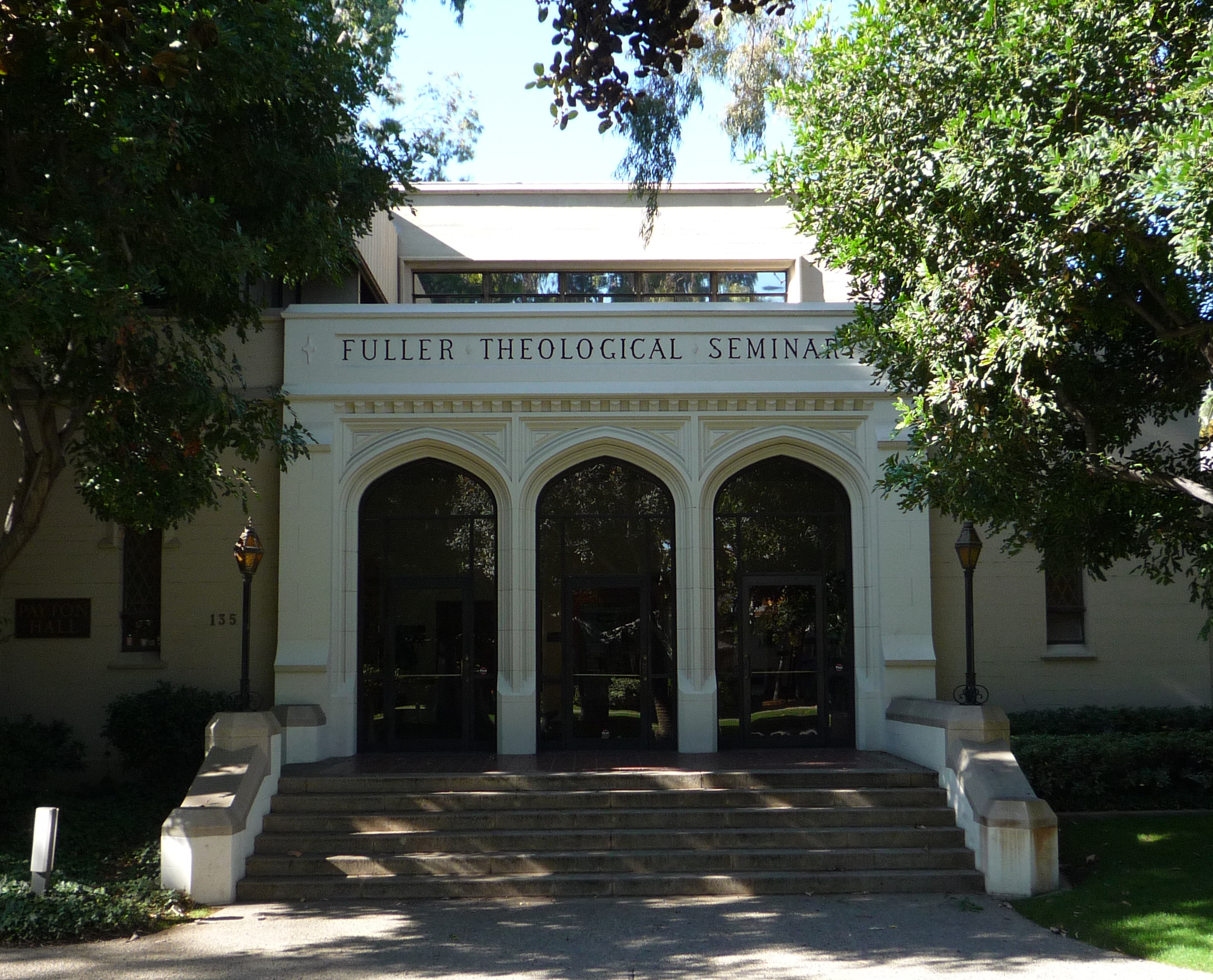
Fuller Theological Seminary

Private elementary schools located in Pasadena include Polytechnic School, Judson International School, Walden, Mayfield Junior School, Chandler School, Westridge School, St. Andrew's Catholic Church, St. Phillip the Apostle School, and Sequoyah School. Private high schools include Mayfield Senior School, Judson International School, Polytechnic School, The Waverly School, Westridge School, La Salle High School, and Maranatha High School.

University of the People, the world's first tuition-free online university which awards accredited degrees, is located on Lake Avenue.

Pasadena had a public library before it was incorporated as a city. The Pasadena Central Library was designed by architect Myron Hunt and dedicated in 1927. The library has an area of 110,000 square feet (10,000 m^{2}) and was recently renovated without damaging any of its historic integrity. Movies like Matilda, Legally Blonde and Red Dragon utilized the Pasadena Central Library for both its architecture and interior while filming. The library is also listed on the National Register of Historic Places.

== Media ==
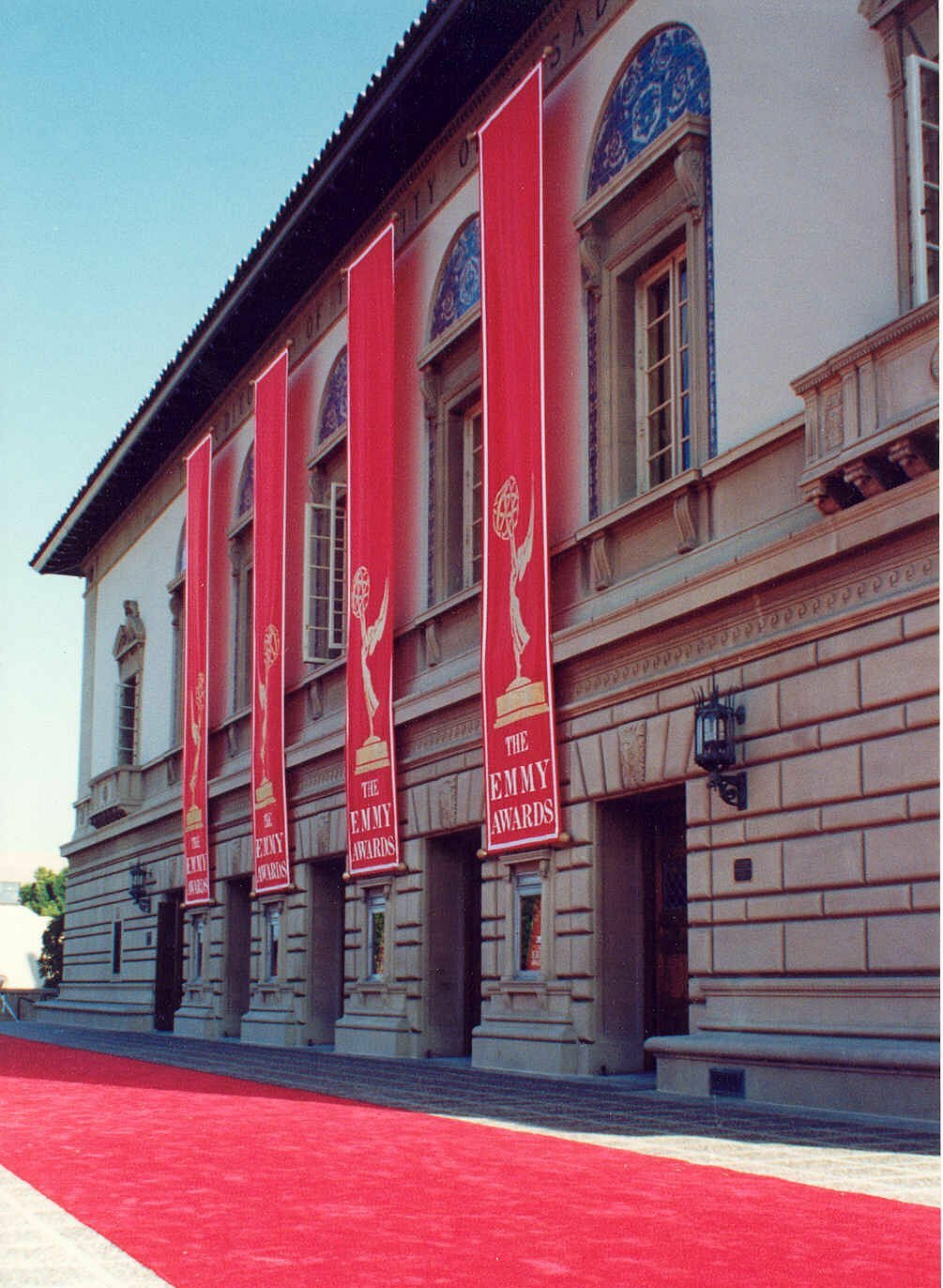
Pasadena Civic Auditorium, longtime venue of the Emmy Awards

=== Civic Auditorium venue ===
The Civic Auditorium is on Green Street. It was designed to be the south cornerstone of Pasadena's Civic Plaza. Every year, the popular television competition, American Idol films their "Hollywood Week" show there. It was also the venue for the Miss Teen USA 2007 pageant. The main auditorium is large enough to have been home to the annual Emmy Awards ceremony for 20 years, from 1977 to 1997. It is also used for high school graduation ceremonies for the Pasadena Unified School District and several private schools.

=== Television ===
Pasadena is the setting of many TV shows including Family (1976 TV series), Brothers & Sisters, Shrinking (an Apple TV+ series), Disney Channel's Dog with a Blog, CBS's The Neighborhood and The Big Bang Theory.

Pasadena Community Access Corporation oversees four television channels: The Arroyo Channel (Channel 32), KPAS (Channel 3), KLRN (Channel 95) and PCC TV (Channel 96). Local television news for Pasadena is produced through this station by the independently operated Crown City News.

ABC's TV show Splash was filmed at the Rose Bowl Aquatics Center.

=== Radio ===
Pasadena has been home to a number of notable radio stations. In 1967 radio iconoclasts Tom and Raechel Donahue took over an aging studio in the basement of the Pasadena Presbyterian Church and introduced Los Angeles to FM freeform radio. Broadcasting under the KPPC-FM call sign at 106.7 FM it quickly became the voice of the counterculture and provided the soundtrack to LA's hippie era. Early on-air personalities included Michael McKean, David Lander, Harry Shearer, and Dr. Demento. The staff was fired en masse in 1971 and the station lost its distinctive personality. KPPC later became KROQ-FM, which is owned by Audacy.

Today the primary radio station in Pasadena goes by the call sign KPCC located at 89.3 FM. Broadcasting from the Mohn Broadcast Center on South Raymond Avenue (and no longer on the Pasadena City College campus), this public radio station carries many shows from National Public Radio but maintains an independent streak, committing a large chunk of air time to presenting local and state news. Accordingly, the station has received numerous awards for journalistic excellence and continues to be an important part of the city's heritage. WilsonBlock1000 Radio conducts audio interviews with local artists and covers events related to the local music scene. Their name derives from Wilson Ave. in Pasadena's Bungalow Heaven neighborhood district.

=== Newspapers and magazines ===
Pasadena's largest and oldest newspaper is the Pasadena Star-News, first published in 1884. The daily newspaper covers local politics, sports, and other news, and also publishes the Rose Magazine.

Pasadena Now is a community news website covering stories in the community since 2004. Pasadena Weekly, an alternative weekly, has been published since 1984. Colorado Boulevard Newspaper is a grassroots news outlet launched in 2013 and covers Pasadena, Altadena and other cities in the San Gabriel Valley, with stories written by residents of the communities. Pasadena Outlook covers news from non-profit organizations, social events, private K-12 school and private high school sports coverage. It was launched in 2007.

== Infrastructure ==
=== Transportation ===
==== Public transit ====
===== Buses =====
Pasadena is served by various bus services. Pasadena Transit serves as the main public bus service for the city. The current service include 11 routes with 32 buses. Other bus services like Amtrak Thruway 19, Foothill Transit, LADOT Commuter Express 549, Metro Local, and Metro Express also serve Pasadena.

===== Rail =====
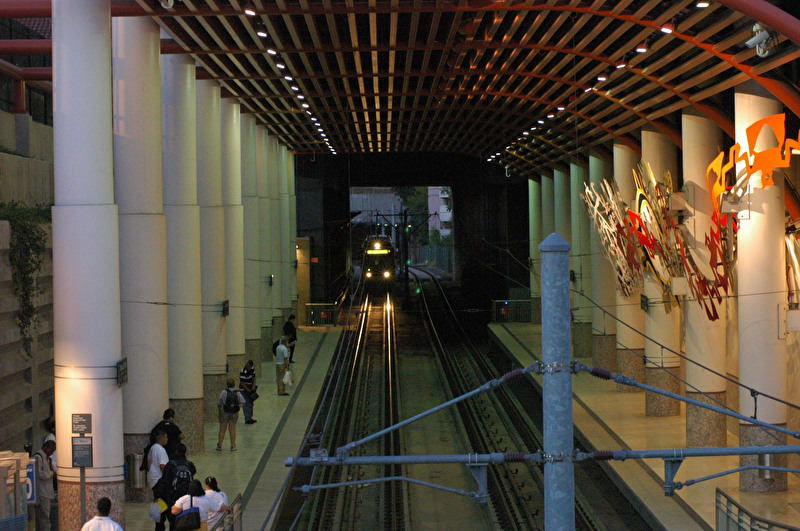
A Line Memorial Park Station

Pasadena is served by the Los Angeles Metro A Line light rail, which originates at the Downtown Long Beach station in Long Beach and Pomona-North station in Pomona. Opening in 2003 as the Gold Line, there are six A Line stations in Pasadena: Fillmore, Del Mar, and Memorial Park stations in Old Pasadena, Lake station in Downtown, Allen and Sierra Madre Villa stations. Construction began in June 2010 to extend the Gold Line east through several additional foothill communities of the San Gabriel Valley, including Arcadia, Monrovia, Duarte, Irwindale, Azusa, Glendora, San Dimas, La Verne, and Pomona. It began revenue service on March 5, 2016.

Pasadena is also served by various bus services. Pasadena Transit exclusively serves the city, while bus services Amtrak Thruway 19, Foothill Transit, LADOT Commuter Express 549, Metro Local, and Metro Express also serve Pasadena.

==== Trains ====
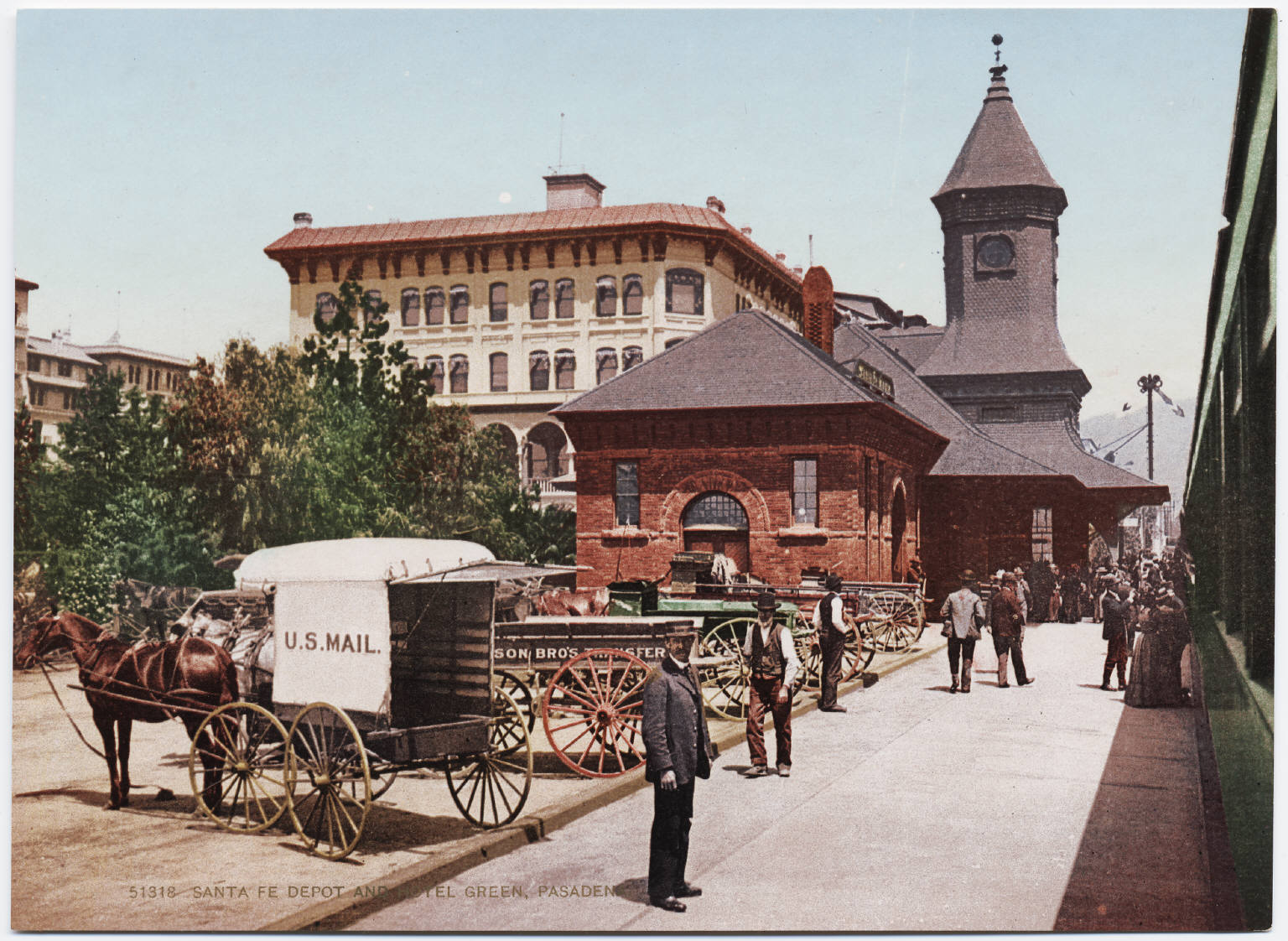
Santa Fe Depot c. 1900

Pasadena was served by the Los Angeles and San Gabriel Valley Railroad, which was acquired by the Atchison, Topeka and Santa Fe Railway in 1906, at a Santa Fe Depot in downtown when the Second District was opened in 1887. In 1925, the historical and traditionally styled station in Pasadena was opened. Originally, the Second District was an invaluable line; it served manufacturing and agricultural businesses throughout the entire San Gabriel Valley. But longer trains had great difficulty climbing the precipitous 2.2% grade at Arroyo Seco, between Pasadena and Los Angeles, requiring the costly addition of extra locomotives. The still-used Third District opened in 1888, just a year after the Second District, and rapidly took over most of the longer freight trains.

The Second District and the Pasadena Depot became well known; up to 26 passenger trains went through Pasadena every day. To avoid the media in Los Angeles, many celebrities chose to use Pasadena as their main train station, bringing it an association with old Hollywood.

Amtrak took over passenger rail operations in 1971, serving Pasadena with trains such as the Southwest Chief, Las Vegas Limited, and Desert Wind. On January 15, 1994, the final Southwest Chief train arrived in Pasadena. ATSF sold the line between Los Angeles and San Bernardino via Pasadena (known as the "second division") following the 1994 Northridge earthquake which damaged a bridge in Arcadia used by the line. (Now the Southwest Chief operates over the transcon via Fullerton.) The LACMTA A Line uses the right-of-way after rebuilding the route to accommodate light rail in 2003. The old depot is still visible at the Del Mar station, though it has since been converted into a restaurant. Electrified Light Rail was the preferred alternative to Metrolink or similar style rail service due to the city of Pasadena voting against any further diesel locomotives traversing through the city. The construction of the Gold Line also allowed the closure of the former railroad crossing along Colorado Boulevard which meant that motorists and the Rose Parade would no longer be hindered by trains.

==== Airports ====
Hollywood Burbank Airport in nearby Burbank serves as the regional airport for Pasadena. The airport is owned and operated by the Burbank-Glendale-Pasadena Airport Authority. The airport is under the control of the governments of the three cities named. While most destinations from Hollywood Burbank Airport are within the United States, Los Angeles International Airport and Ontario International Airport are the major airports that provide domestic and international commercial service. Other nearby airports with commercial service include Long Beach Airport and John Wayne Airport.

==== Freeways and highways ====
Four freeways run through Pasadena, and Pasadena is a control city for all of them. The most important is the Foothill Freeway (I-210) which enters the northwestern portion of the city from La Cañada Flintridge. The Foothill Freeway initially runs due south, passing the Rose Bowl before its junction with the Ventura Freeway. At this interchange, the Foothill Freeway shifts its alignment and direction, becoming an east-west freeway, exiting the city on its eastern boundary before entering Arcadia. The Foothill Freeway connects Pasadena with San Fernando (westbound) and San Bernardino (eastbound).

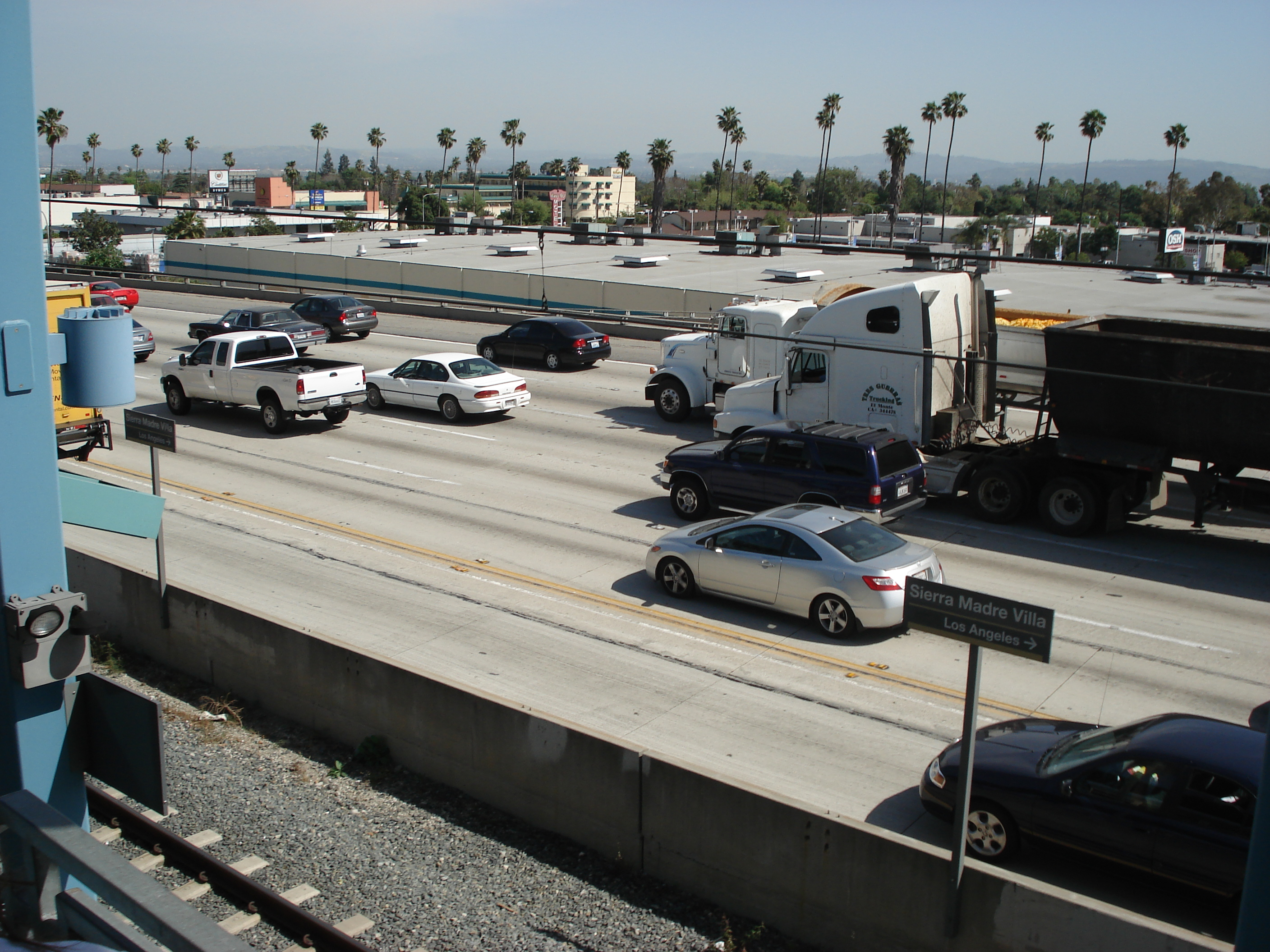
Foothill Freeway (I-210) as seen from the Metro L Line Sierra Madre Villa Station

The Ventura Freeway (SR 134) starts at the junction of the Foothill Freeway (I-210) at the edge of downtown Pasadena and travels westward. This freeway is the main connector to the Hollywood Burbank Airport and the San Fernando Valley.

A spur of the Long Beach Freeway (SR 710 in Pasadena) is also located in Pasadena. The Long Beach Freeway was intended to connect Long Beach to Pasadena but a gap, known as the South Pasadena Gap, between Alhambra and Pasadena has not been completed due to legal battles primarily involving the city of South Pasadena. The spur starts at the junction of the Ventura Freeway and Foothill Freeway and travels south along the eastern edge of Old Pasadena with two exits for Colorado Boulevard and Del Mar Boulevard before ending at an at-grade intersection with California Boulevard. Efforts to complete the Long Beach Freeway were met with strong opposition, including the possibility of using advanced tunneling technologies to overcome objections. The gap will no longer be constructed, with the $780 million earmarked for constructing the gap now allocated towards local infrastructure improvements. Pasadena is exploring options on the future of the spur.

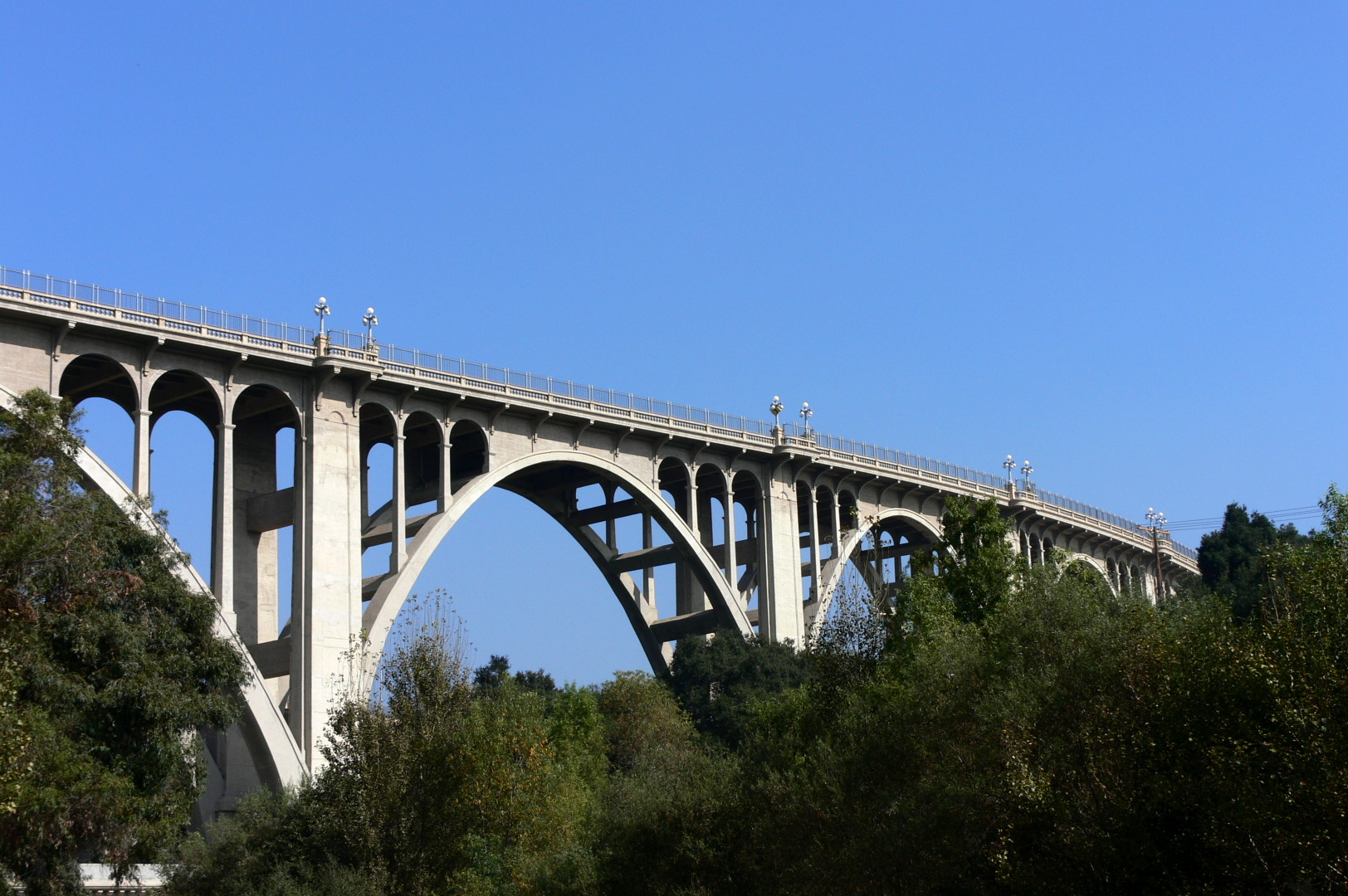
Colorado Street Bridge seen from the Arroyo Seco below

The Arroyo Seco Parkway (SR 110), also known as the Pasadena Freeway, was the first freeway in California, connecting Los Angeles with Pasadena alongside the Arroyo Seco and is the primary access to Downtown Los Angeles. The freeway enters the southern part of the city from South Pasadena. Only one exit is actually inside city limits, the southbound exit connecting to State Street with access to Fair Oaks Avenue. At Glenarm Street, the freeway ends and the four-lane Arroyo Parkway continues northward to Old Pasadena.

Three state highways enter the city of Pasadena. Arroyo Parkway (SR 110), maintained by the city of Pasadena, runs from the termination of the Pasadena Freeway at Glenarm Street to Colorado Boulevard in Old Town Pasadena. While Arroyo Parkway continues north two more blocks, SR 110 ends at Holly Street.

Rosemead Boulevard (formerly SR 19) is a state highway in unincorporated Pasadena from Huntington Drive to Foothill Boulevard.

A portion of the Angeles Crest Highway (SR 2) in the San Gabriel Mountains cuts through Pasadena near the Angeles Crest Ranger Station. This 2-mile (3.2 km) stretch of highway in the Angeles National Forest is north of La Cañada Flintridge and west of Mount Wilson and is approximately 3,000 feet (910 m) in elevation.

Historic U.S. Route 66 ran through Pasadena until it was decommissioned in 1964. The historic highway entered Pasadena from the east on Colorado Boulevard and then jogged south on Arroyo Parkway before becoming part of the Pasadena Freeway (SR 110).

The intersection of Fair Oaks Avenue and Colorado Boulevard in Old Pasadena is the zero-zero, east-west, north-south postal division of Pasadena.

=== Water and power ===
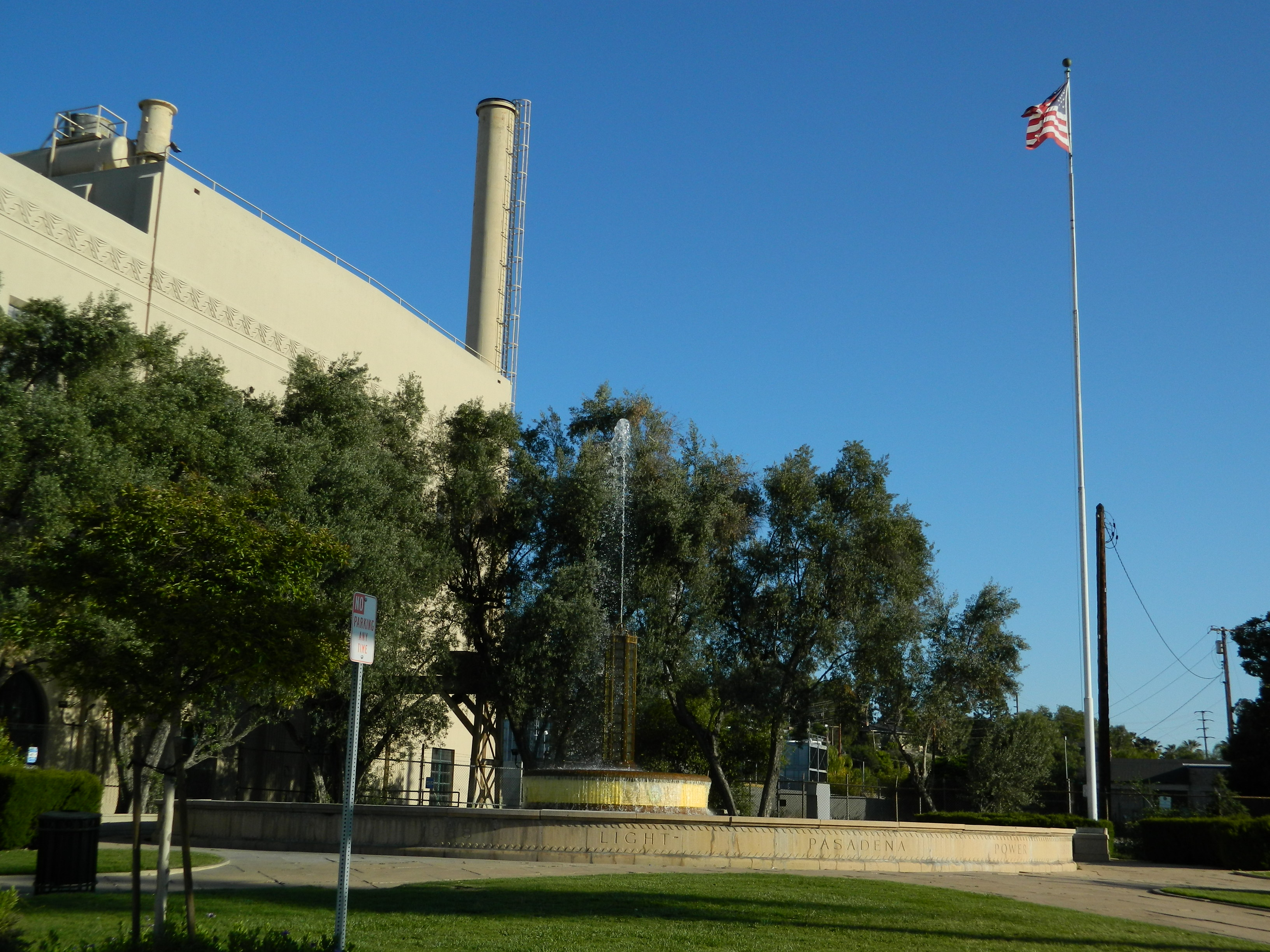
Water and Light Fountain at the historic Glenarm Power Plant. Designed by Harold H. Lewis in 1938.

The city Water and Power Department (PWP) provides services to an area encompassing 23 sq mi (60 km^{2}) that includes areas outside of the city proper, including unincorporated areas of southern Altadena, East Pasadena, Chapman Woods, and East San Gabriel. PWP has operated the Glenarm Power Plant for over 110 years.

Pasadena created the Pasadena Municipal Light and Power Department in 1906. Expanding continued and more generating capacity was expanded and the city then offered power to commercial customers in 1908, and bought out Southern California Edison's Pasadena operations in 1920. In 1911, the city began condemnation actions against a number of small, local water companies. In 1912, the Water Department was created; in 1913, it began actual operations. The city continued to acquire small, local water companies for several decades afterwards, usually en toto, such as the Pasadena Lake Vineyard and Land Company, and sometimes in part, such as Las Flores Water Company's southern portions and San Gabriel Valley Water Company's operations in the southern reaches of Pasadena. In 1967, the Water Department and the Light and Power department were consolidated into the "Pasadena Water and Power Department" (PWP).

It operates a number of water wells, has a spreading ground for the capture of surface water from the Arroyo Seco, and purchases surface water from MWDSC. A number of wells on the west side of the service area had become contaminated with volatile organic chemicals and perchlorate and had to be shut down several years. A treatment plant was built to remove these chemicals which began operation in July 2011.

=== Animal services ===
As of 2026 the Pasadena Humane Society contracts with the City of Pasadena for animal services.

== Wildlife ==
Pasadena has a large, non-indigenous population of naturalized parrots. According to the "Parrot Project of Los Angeles", the parrots are of at least six species. Some residents have come to enjoy the birds as part of the city's unique culture, while others consider them to be loud pests. There are many theories explaining how the parrots came to inhabit Pasadena. A widely accepted story is that they were part of the stock that were set free for their survival from the large pet emporium at Simpson's Garden Town on East Colorado Boulevard, which burned down in 1959.

== Sister cities ==
The Pasadena Sister Cities Committee is the official organization that maintains Pasadena's ties with its corresponding sister cities. The mayor and vice mayor of Pasadena are members on an ex officio basis.

Pasadena has six sister cities as noted by Sister Cities International (SCI) and the Pasadena Sister Cities Committee:

- Ludwigshafen, Rhineland-Palatinate, Germany (1948) pre-dates Sister Cities International which was formed in 1956
- Mishima, Shizuoka, Japan (1957)
- Järvenpää, Finland (1983)
- Vanadzor, Armenia (1991)
- Xicheng District, Beijing, China (1999)
- Dakar-Plateau, Senegal (2019)

The following are Friendship Cities: Kasukabe, Japan (1993) and Paju, Gyeonggi, South Korea (2009)

== See also ==
- Largest cities in Southern California
- List of cities and towns in California
- National Register of Historic Places listings in Pasadena, California
- USS Pasadena, 3 ships

== Explanatory notes ==
^{A} The number of people counted statistically in demographics will sometimes exceed 100% because some Hispanics and Latinos identify as both White and Hispanic. See Race and ethnicity in the United States Census.
