= Neighborhoods in Pasadena, California =

There are several neighborhoods in the city of Pasadena, California.

== Downtown ==
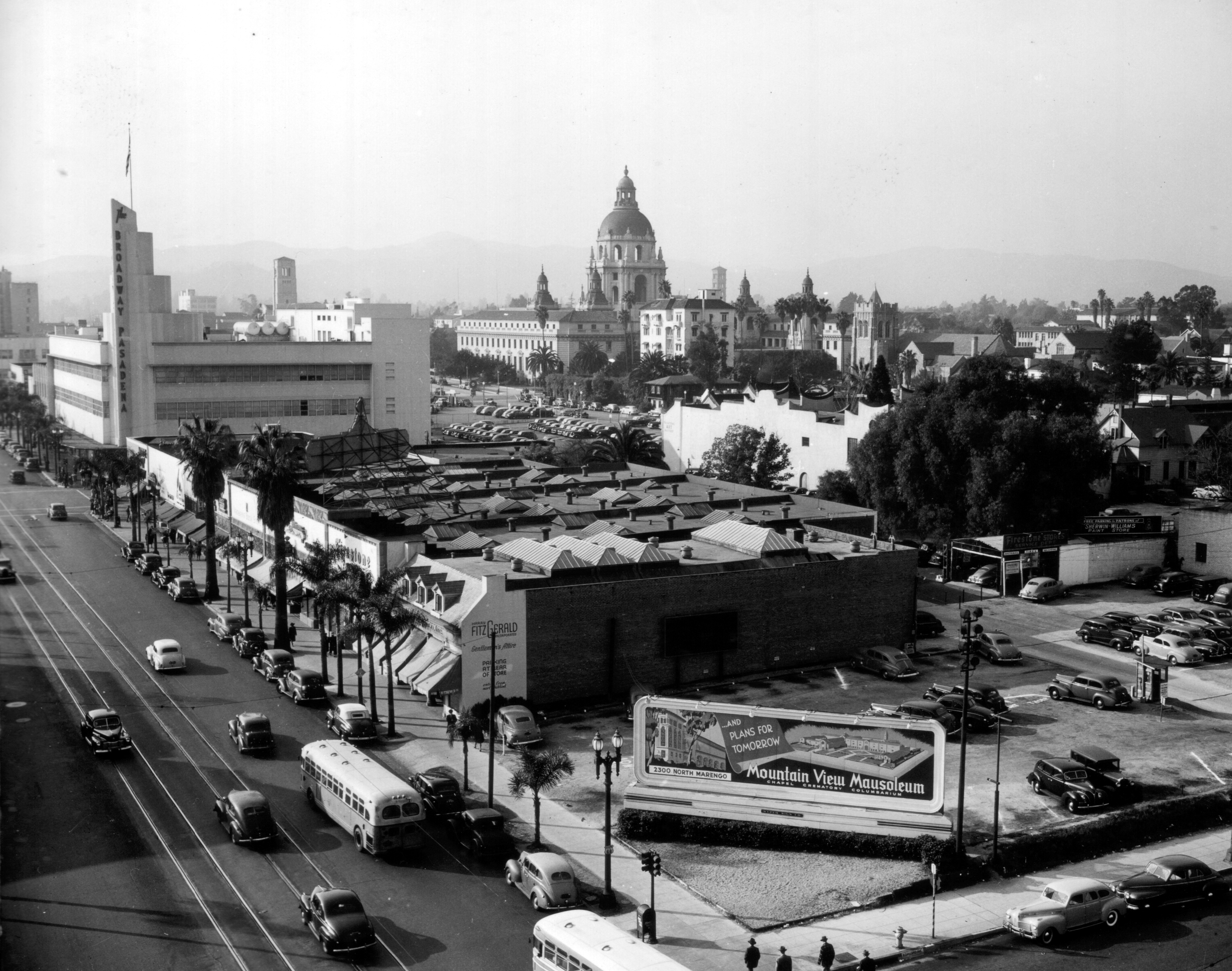
Downtown Pasadena in 1945

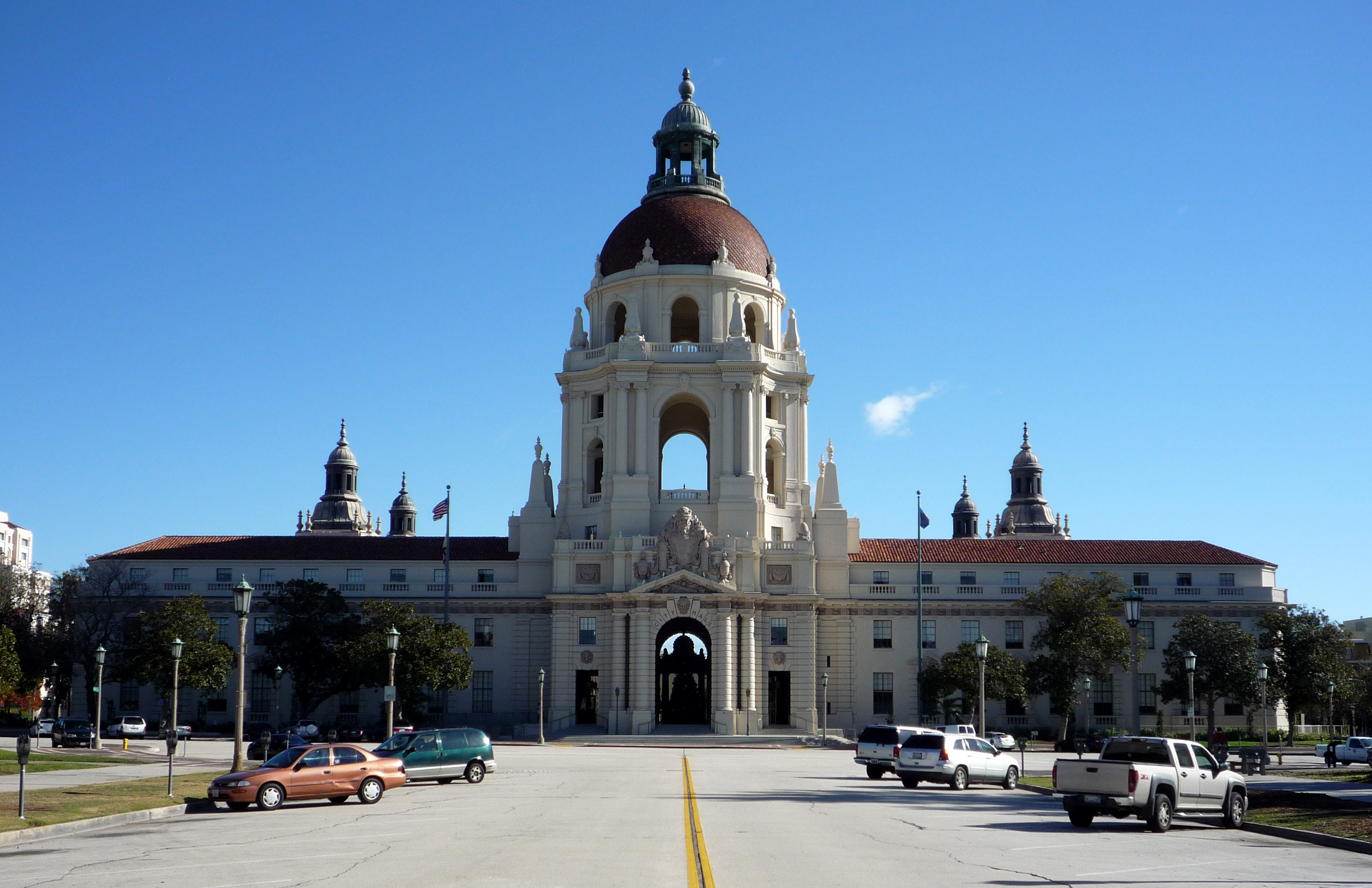
Pasadena City Hall

Downtown Pasadena California is the central business district of Pasadena. It is centered on Fair Oaks Avenue and Colorado Boulevard. Downtown Pasadena is known for its historical buildings that have been preserved throughout the years. Most of the area is served by McKinley School and Blair High School

=== Old Pasadena ===
Old Pasadena is the historic core of Downtown Pasadena; it has a multitude of fine shops and restaurants (Italian and Japanese restaurants are especially numerous here). The attractions in the area involve shopping, dining, and entertainment. There are two parks, the historic Del Mar Station and Castle Green, and the headquarters of Parsons.

=== Civic Center District ===
The Civic Center lies to the east of Old Pasadena and was built in the 1920s. It is roughly bounded by Walnut and Green Streets and Raymond and Euclid Avenues. It is home to Pasadena's City Hall, Pasadena Central Library, Paseo Colorado, and the Pasadena Civic Auditorium. The district was added to the U.S. National Register of Historic Places in 1980. It also houses several municipal government offices, though notably not the Department of Public Works, which is in Banbury Oaks.

=== Monk Hill ===
Monk Hill is the westernmost part of Downtown Pasadena and is home to the Norton Simon Museum and Ambassador Auditorium.

=== Playhouse District ===
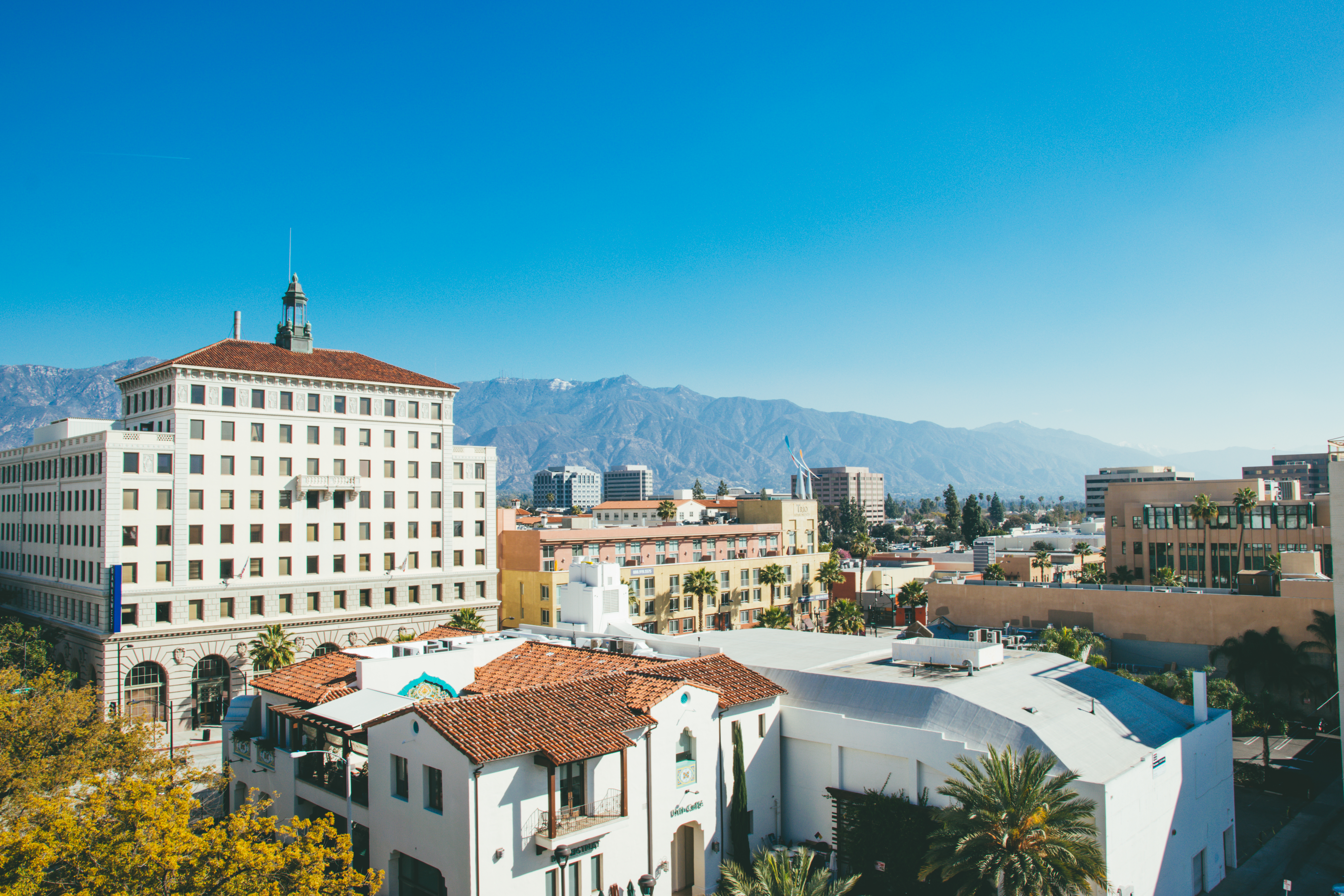
Birds eye view of the central business cluster down Colorado Blvd of Playhouse Village

Playhouse Village, (formerly known as Playhouse District) a neighborhood in Pasadena, is bordered by Interstate 210 to the north, California Boulevard to the south, Los Robles Avenue to the west, and Hudson Avenue to the east; it has a panhandle-like extension to Wilson Avenue. The district is also notable for its manhattanization, the legacy of extensive urbanization from the 1960s to the 1980s.

At Playhouse Village's center is the district's namesake, the Pasadena Playhouse, as well as Vroman's Bookstore, Pasadena's oldest operating independent bookstore, and Landmark Theatres Pasadena. The neighborhood's east end has the Ice House comedy club and Boston Court Pasadena, an arthouse. Fuller Theological Seminary is located at the western end.

At the corner of Colorado Boulevard and Oakland Ave. is the Pasadena Star News building. The newspaper began publication in 1884. The building now houses Pasadena's location for the New School of Cooking's and a 24 Hour Fitness location. The First United Methodist Church and Pasadena Presbyterian Church, which was the former home of KPPC-FM, are located on Colorado Blvd.

The USC Pacific Asia Museum, which started in 1971, is located on North Los Robles Avenue. It has a collection of 15,000 pieces of art work from Asia and the Pacific Islands.

== Northwest Pasadena ==
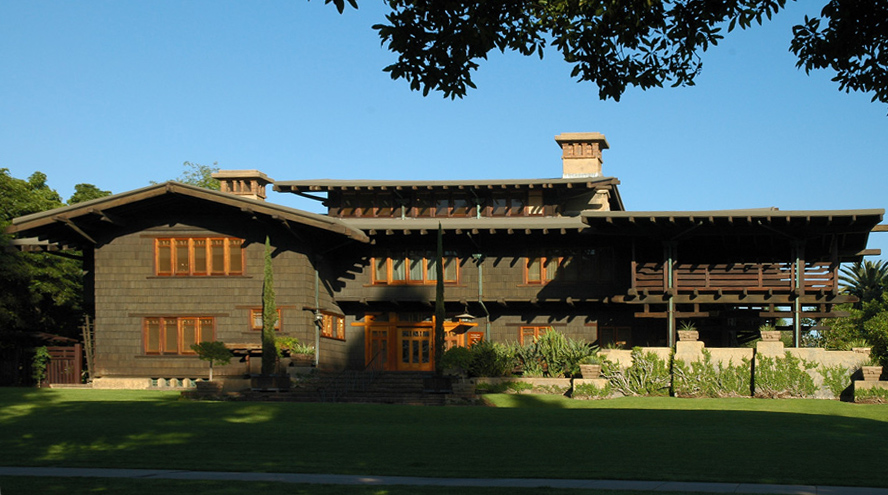
Gamble House was home to David B. Gamble of the Procter & Gamblecompany.

Northwest Pasadena is bordered on the north and west by the city limits, on the south by the 210 and 134 Freeways, and the east by Los Robles and El Molino Avenues. It has traditionally been a working-class area with a significant African-American and Hispanic American populations. Portions of Northwest Pasadena were razed to build the 210 Freeway and the 210/134 interchange. Residents of Northwest Pasadena generally attend John Muir High School. The region is served by Metro Local lines 660 and 662, as well as Pasadena Transit lines 20, 31, 32, 33, 51, 52 and 53. Corridors of commercial development in this area include Fair Oaks Avenue, Lincoln Avenue, Orange Grove Boulevard, Washington Boulevard, and Woodbury Road.

=== Arroyo Terrace ===
The houses surrounding Brookside Park are referred to as Arroyo Terrace, The Brookside Park/Arroyo Terrace neighborhood. It is Pasadena's second largest neighborhood by area, and its second most sparsely populated. The neighborhood is bordered by Oak Grove Drive to the north, the Arroyo Seco Canyon wall to the south, Linda Vista Avenue to the West, and Forest and Rosemont Avenues to the East. It has an odd shape; almost all of Brookside Park is served by Grover Cleveland Elementary School, Eliot and Butler Middle Schools, and John Muir High School. Chandler School is a private school in the neighborhood. A portion of the neighborhood is the Park Place–Arroyo Terrace Historic District, which was added to the National Register of Historic Places on June 29, 2007.

=== Banbury Oaks ===
Banbury Oaks is bordered by Washington Boulevard to the north, Mountain Street to the south, Fair Oaks Avenue to the East, and Forest Avenue to the west. The Banbury Oaks Neighborhood Association sets Banbury Oaks' boundaries at Sunset Ave. between Claremont St. and Mountain St. including 1/2 block of Claremont St. between Glen Ave. & Sunset Ave. The neighborhood is bisected by the 210 freeway. The main roads through the neighborhood are Hammond Street and Lincoln Avenue.

Jackie Robinson Park is located on Fair Oaks and Hammond, Jackie Robinson's childhood home is nearby. On the east side of Sunset Avenue from Glorieta Avenue to Hammond Avenue three houses are not part of the Banbury Oaks Landmark District. The residents chose not be included as part of the historical landmark status of the Banbury Oaks Landmark district in the city of Pasadena. The Pasadena Historic Preservation Commission also covers the Banbury Oaks district.

Banbury Oaks is served by Cleveland Elementary School and Octavia Butler Middle School.

=== Garfield Heights ===
Garfield Heights is bordered by Washington Boulevard to the north, Mountain Street to the south, North Marengo Avenue to the west, and Los Robles Avenue to the east.The original tract's name was registered with the city of Pasadena in 1904. In 1998, the area was designated a landmark district.

The neighborhood contains one of the city's oldest intact neighborhoods featuring a variety of architectural styles ranging from Queen Anne to Spanish Revival. Many of the era's architects built homes here including Meyer & Holler, Greene and Greene and Sylvanus Marston. Los Angeles magazine referred to the neighborhood as "Pasadena's very well kept little secret".

Garfield Heights is served by Washington Elementary, Washington Middle, and John Muir High School.

=== La Pintoresca ===
La Pintoresca is a neighborhood in Pasadena surrounding the park of the same name. It is bordered by Montana Street to the north, Washington Boulevard to the south, Fair Oaks Avenue to the west, and Los Robles Avenue to the east. Notable landmarks in the neighborhood include Octavia Butler Middle School, Washington Elementary School, La Pintoresca Park, and Robincroft Castle.

=== Lincoln-Villa ===
Lincoln-Villa is bordered by Mountain Street to the north, Walnut Street to the south, Lincoln Avenue and Orange Grove Boulevard to the west, and Fair Oaks Avenue to the east.

Lincoln-Villa's central plaza covers a couple of city blocks around the intersection of Fair Oaks Avenue and Orange Grove Boulevard, in addition to commercial developments on Fair Oaks, Villa Street, and Peoria Street. The neighborhood is also home to Pasadena's central post office. Much of the neighborhood was razed in the late 1960s making way for the intersection of the 210, 710, and 134 Freeways. Lincoln-Villa has some of Pasadena's heaviest street traffic, as a result of the aforementioned freeway interchange and the neighborhood's position between Downtown and the Rose Bowl.

Lincoln-Villa is served by Madison Elementary School, Octavia Butler Middle School and John Muir High School.

=== Linda Vista ===
Linda Vista is a wealthy area of Pasadena to the west of Brookside Park and Linda Vista Avenue.

=== Muir Heights ===
Muir Heights refers to the area around John Muir High School.

=== The Oaks ===
The Oaks neighborhood is bordered by Mountain Street to the north, Interstate 210 to the south, the El Molino Avenue to the east, and Los Robles Avenue to the west.

The Oaks is home to Madison Elementary School, and is also served by Octavia Butler Middle School, Pasadena High School and John Muir High School. The Oaks is split between City Council District 3, represented by council member Justin Jones, and District 5, represented by Jessica Rivas.

=== Orange Heights ===
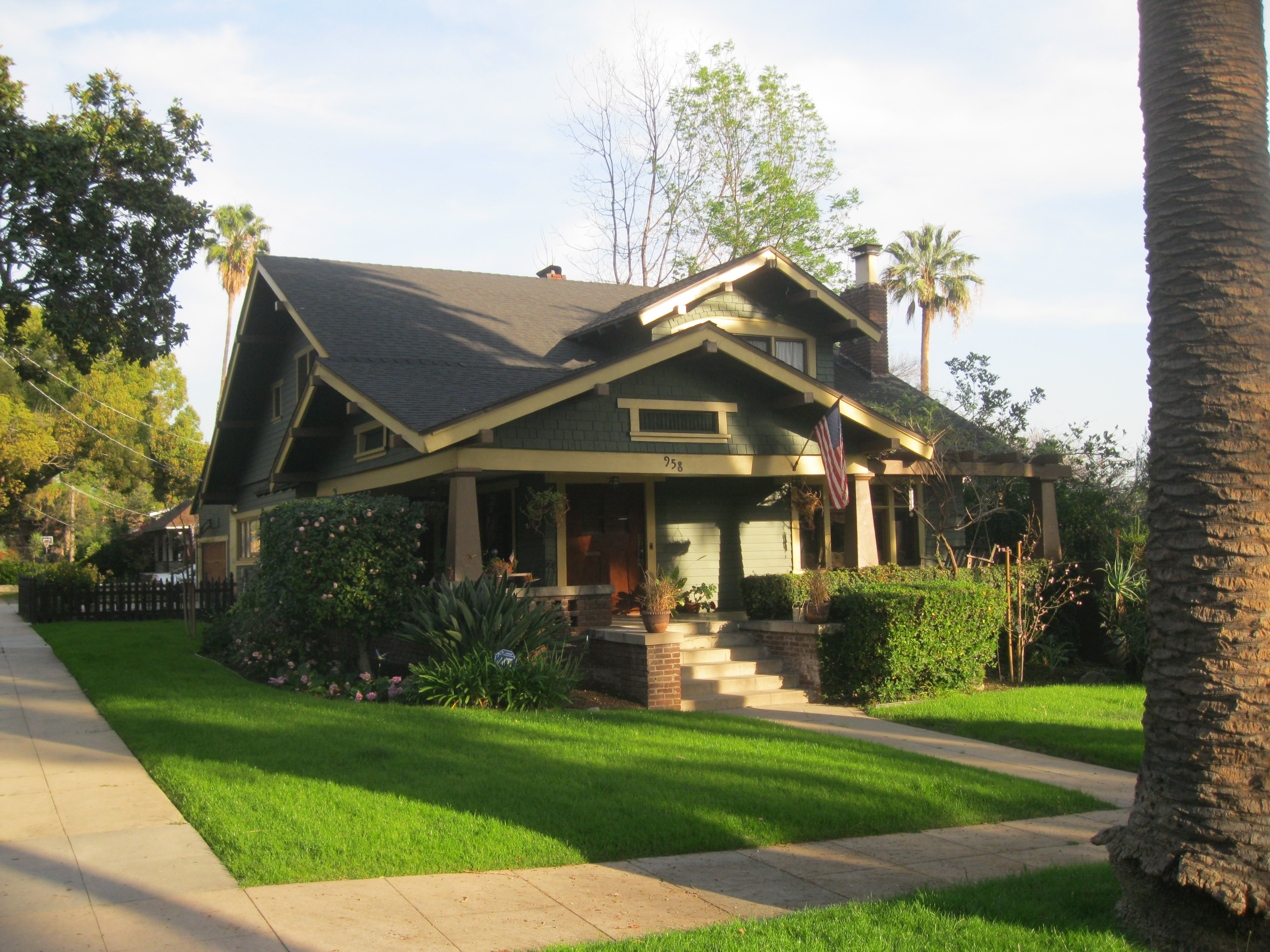
A house in Orange Heights

Orange Heights is bordered by Jackson Street to the north, Mountain Street to the south, Los Robles Avenue to the west, and El Molino Avenue to the east. The Orange Heights-Barnhart Historic District was added to the NHRP (National Register of Historical Places) on September 29, 1995

Orange Heights is served by Longfellow Elementary School, Eliot Middle School, and John Muir High School. Orange Heights is part of City Council District 3, represented by Justin Jones, and District 5, represented by Jessica Rivas.

=== Prospect Park ===
Prospect Park is bordered by Westgate Street to the north, Orange Grove Boulevard to the south, Rosemont Avenue to the west, and Lincoln Avenue to the east. Many of the historic homes in the neighborhood were built between 1906 and 1930. The district was added to the National Register of Historic Places on April 7, 1983.

=== Villa Parke ===
Villa Parke is bordered by Mountain Street to the north, Interstate 210 to the south, Fair Oaks Avenue to the west, and Los Robles Avenue to the east. It surrounds the recreation center with the same name, located at Villa Street and Euclid Avenue. At the district's southern edge is the iconic brick clock tower at St. Andrew's Church.

Villa Parke has its own soccer league, The Villa Parke Soccer League. The league has divisions including women's division, Mascotas division( children), teens division, and adult division. Various game fields include Villa Parke field, Brookside field, Victory Park field, the Rose Bowl, and other parks in the Pasadena/Altadena area. Sometimes John Muir and other schools are as locations for games.

Villa Parke is served by Madison and Washington Elementary Schools, Octavia Butler Middle School, and John Muir High School.

== North Lake ==
North Lake is a large area of Pasadena with all of the neighborhoods along North Lake Avenue between Walnut Street and Woodbury Road. Lake Avenue the major commercial and transportation corridor of this area; Orange Grove Blvd, Washington Boulevard and Hill Avenue are also important streets. The area is split between Muir and Pasadena High Schools. The Metro A Line has a station on Lake Avenue at Interstate 210. The neighborhood is served by Metro Local line 662 and Pasadena Transit routes 20, 31, 32, 33 and 40.

=== Bungalow Heaven ===
Bungalow Heaven is a landmark district centered on McDonald Park. The district is listed on the U.S. National Register of Historic Places.

=== Catalina Villas ===
Catalina Villas is bordered by Orange Grove Boulevard to the north, Walnut Street and Colorado Boulevard to the south, Lake and Wilson Avenues to the west, and Hill Avenue to the east.

There is heavy commercial development on Colorado Boulevard, Walnut Street, Lake Avenue, and Hill Avenue. The neighborhood is bisected by the I-210 and has no parks. Catalina Villas is served by Jefferson and McKinley Elementary Schools; Wilson, McKinley, and Eliot Middle Schools.

=== Lexington Heights ===
Lexington Heights is bordered by Atchison Street (the northern city limit) to the north, Washington Boulevard to the south, Lake Avenue to the west, and Hill Avenue to the east. Lake Avenue and Washington Boulevard have some commercial development, but for the most part Lexington Heights is a residential neighborhood. Lexington Heights is home to Longfellow Elementary School; it is served by Burbank Elementary School and Eliot Middle School

=== Normandie Heights ===
Normandie Heights is bordered by Woodbury Road to the north, Washington Boulevard to the south, Los Robles Avenue to the west, and Lake Avenue to the east.

=== Olive Heights ===
Olive Heights is the most densely populated neighborhood in Pasadena. It is bordered by Mountain Street to the north, Walnut Street to the south, El Molino Avenue to the west, and Lake Avenue to the east.

Olive Heights is served by Madison, Jefferson, and McKinley Elementary Schools as well as Washington, Eliot, and McKinley Middle Schools. Olive Heights is part of City Council District 3, represented by Justin Jones, and District 5, represented by Jessica Rivas.

=== Washington Square ===
Washington Square (34.166°N 118.135°W) is bordered by Washington Boulevard to the north, Mountain Street to the south, El Molino Avenue to the west, and Lake Avenue to the east. It is notable for having been renamed several times, having been known as part of Orange Heights until the 1950s; in the 1980s it was renamed CLEM (short for Claremont, Lake, El Molino, and Mountain; the streets then encompassing the official area), then Heather Heights until the late 1990s when it was given its current name. The neighborhood was built up gradually until the 1940s, when the last housing tract was built around Heather Square.

The land that became Washington Square was a large open field that eventually got replaced by a patchwork of small olive and orange groves. The glen at the corner of Washington and El Molino was used as a municipal dump until 1922, when Theodore Payne reclaimed the land for a park (present-day Washington Park). This helped spur neighborhood development. By 1930, all but the Jonathan Tract (Heather Square) had been filled in. The west-central area of the neighborhood remained undeveloped until 1943. Over the 1970s and 1980s, property values in the neighborhood plummeted. Gang violence and drug manufacturing became rampant, and historic buildings were demolished in favor of low-rent apartments and cheap shopping centers. The Great Recession followed a 20-year-long wave of gentrification and the neighborhood quickly fell into disrepair, struggling with safety and vacancy. To combat this issue, In 2003 residents joined together to form the Washington Square Neighborhood Association successfully reducing crime and establishing Washington Square as a historic Pasadena landmark district encompassing approximately 250 homes built mainly between 1910 and 1940. Architectural styles range from California Craftsman, Spanish Colonial, Tudor, English Cottage to Traditional. Streets are lined with old-growth Camphor, California Oak and Palm trees which not only add beauty to the neighborhood but also keeps homes cool during the warm California summers. All contributing properties are eligible for the Mills Act which gives homeowners a substantial real estate tax savings for maintaining their historic home.

Washington Square is notable for having one of Pasadena's oldest parks, Washington Park, which was reclaimed from a municipal dump in 1922. Woodbury Creek also runs through the neighborhood, though most of the creek now runs underground. The neighborhood is also home to two of Pasadena's oldest standing houses, which date from the early 1890s, and the one-time home of author Upton Sinclair (it is believed that the house belonged to him during his run for Governor of California.

Washington Square is served by Marshall Secondary School, Longfellow Elementary School, Eliot Middle School, and John Muir High School.

Washington Square is served by Metro Local line 662; as well as Pasadena Transit routes 20, 31, 32 and 33.

Major streets are:

- Lake Avenue
- Washington Boulevard

== Northeast ==
Northeast Pasadena is the area north of the 210 freeway, between Hill Avenue and the Eaton Wash. Residents of Northeast Pasadena attend Pasadena High or Thurgood Marshall Secondary School. This neighborhood is served by Metro Local line 267, Foothill Transit Route 187 and Pasadena Transit lines 10, 31, 32, 33, 40 and 60. The Metro A Line, formerly the Gold Line, runs along the 210 freeway, with stations at Allen Avenue and Sierra Madre Villa Avenue.

=== Brigden Ranch ===
The Bridgen Ranch Neighborhood Association defines the borders of Bridgen Ranch as Galbreth Road on the north (including Westlyn Place and Eastlyn Place), Casa Grande Street on the south, North Allen Avenue on the west, and Martelo Avenue on the east. Portions of this neighborhood are in Pasadena and the rest is in unincorporated areas.

All of the commercial development in the neighborhood is on Allen Avenue. Brigden Ranch has no park. Brigden Ranch is served by Webster Elementary School and Eliot Middle School.

=== Casa Grande ===
Casa Grande is bordered by Casa Grande Street, to the north, I-210 to the south, Allen Avenue to the west, and Altadena Drive to the east. The central feature of the neighborhood is the palatial campus of Marshall Fundamental Secondary School, Pasadena's magnet high school. Casa Grande is served by Hamilton, Jefferson, Webster, and Field Elementary Schools, Wilson and Eliot Middle Schools.

=== Daisy-Villa ===
Daisy-Villa is bordered by Sierra Madre Boulevard to the west, Orange Grove Boulevard to the north, the 210 Freeway to the south, and the Eaton Wash to the east. Daisy-Villa is an exclusively residential neighborhood with approximately 350 homes. The neighborhood is named after two streets that meet in the center of the community.

Gwinn Park is in the northeast corner of the neighborhood, and the neighborhood has access to more parks than any other in Pasadena. Residents can easily walk to nearby Victory Park, as well as the adjacent Sunnyslope Park and Vina Vieja Park, home to Pasadena's popular Alice's Dog Park. Daisy-Villa is served by Don Benito Elementary School, Norma Coombs Elementary School, Field Elementary School, Wilson Middle School, and Pasadena High School.

=== East Washington Village ===
East Washington Village is a multiethnic neighborhood in Pasadena, California, straddling the border with Altadena and centered on Washington Boulevard between Hill Avenue and Altadena Drive. Though the western half is in incorporated Pasadena, the eastern half is in unincorporated Altadena.

East Washington Village has heavy commercial development throughout its entire length, and has undergone significant redevelopment in the last decade. The district's southwestern section is home to many federal-style homes, making it a frequent location for films. East Washington Village is also the center of the Armenian-American community in Pasadena.

East Washington Village is home to Webster Elementary School, and is served by Eliot Middle School and Pasadena High School. Burrito Express, on the corner of Washington Boulevard and Sierra Bonita Avenue, is located in the neighborhood.

=== Jefferson Park ===
Jefferson Park is bordered by Orange Grove Boulevard to the north, Walnut Street to the south, Hill Avenue to the west, and Allen Avenue to the east.

At the center of Jefferson Park is Jefferson Elementary School, the adjacent park of the same name, a branch of the public library, and Interstate 210. There is some commercial development on Walnut Street and Allen Avenue. Jefferson Park is served by Jefferson Elementary School, Eliot Middle School, and Pasadena High School.

=== Victory Park ===
Victory Park is bordered by New York Drive to the north, Orange Grove Boulevard to the south, Altadena Drive to the west, and Sierra Madre Boulevard to the east. The park was completed and dedicated on May 25, 1952.

At the center of the neighborhood is the park from which the neighborhood gets its name, which was originally a military airfield. The area also was home to Earthlink headquarters.Victory Park is home to Pasadena High School (commonly referred to as PHS) and is also served by Field Elementary School, Norma Coombs Elementary School, and Norma Coombs Alternative School. Marine Corps Reserve Training Center, Blecksmith Hall, borders victory park to the South, East. Assumption of the Blessed Virgin Mary K-8 Catholic School is a private school in the area.

== Far East ==
The far east portion of Pasadena is east of the Eaton Canyon Wash; some of the newer neighborhoods of Pasadena are here. They are zoned to Pasadena High School. The Metro A Line has a station on Sierra Madre Villa Avenue and Foothill Boulevard, in this section of Pasadena. It is served by Metro Local line 268; Pasadena Transit routes 31, 32, 33, 40, and 60 and Foothill Transit Route 187.

=== California Village ===
California Village is bordered by Sierra Madre Boulevard to the north, Foothill Boulevard to the south, the Eaton Wash to the west, and Sierra Madre Villa Avenue to the east. Like most of the neighborhoods east of the Eaton Wash, it was developed more recently than most other neighborhoods in Pasadena.

The only commercial development in the neighborhood is a single city block on Foothill Boulevard. The neighborhood has no parks, though it is notable for straddling the Eaton Wash and the powerlines that trace its course.

California Village is served by Norma Coombs Elementary School, Field Elementary School, Sierra Madre Middle School, and Pasadena High School.

=== Chapman ===
Chapman, also known as Chapman Woods, is a neighborhood in southern California. Most of the neighborhood is in unincorporated East Pasadena, California, with a small portion extending into the city of Pasadena. The portions in Pasadena are south of Del Mar Blvd and east of the Eaton Wash. Willard Elementary School, along with the former Wilson Middle School, now Rose City Continuation High School and Center for Independent Studies, are located in the area.

=== Hastings Ranch ===
Hastings Ranch is a development east of Sierra Made Villa Avenue and north of the 210 freeway. Formerly a ranch and an airfield, it became a housing tract in the late 1940s and 1950s.

== Southeast ==
Southeastern Pasadena refers to the neighborhoods east of Marengo Avenue and Downtown Pasadena, south of Downtown and the 210 Freeway, and west of Eaton Wash.

Southeast Pasadena is served by Metro Local lines 180, 267 and 662. It is also served by Pasadena Transit routes 10, 20 and 60 and Foothill Transit line 187. The Metro A Line, formerly the Gold Line, runs along the 210 freeway, with stations at Lake Avenue, at Allen Avenue and Sierra Madre Villa Avenue. Residents of Southeast Pasadena attend either Blair International Baccalaureate School or Pasadena High School.

=== Lamanda Park ===
Lamanda Park is bordered roughly by Foothill Boulevard to the north, Del Mar Boulevard to the south, the Eaton Wash to the east, and Allen Avenue to the west. Lamanda Park is an old settlement, with the railroad first coming in 1885

=== Madison Heights ===
Madison Heights is bordered by California Boulevard to the north; Lake Avenue, Arden Road, Oak Knoll Avenue, Oak Knoll Circle, and El Molino Avenue to the east; Allendale, Los Robles Avenue, and South Pasadena to the south, and Marengo Avenue to the west.

Madison Heights is home to Allendale Elementary School and Blair International Baccalaureate School. The neighborhood is served by McKinley and Hamilton Elementary Schools, and McKinley Middle Schools. Madison Heights is split between City Council District 6, represented by Steve Madison, and District 7, represented by Jason Lyon.

=== Oak Knoll ===
Oak Knoll, the southernmost neighborhood of Pasadena, is bordered by Oak Knoll Circle to the north, Old Mill Road to the south, South Oak Knoll Avenue and South Oakland Avenue to the west, and the San Marino border (Kewen Drive and Encino Drive) to the east. Several palatial and historic houses and hotels are located in this neighborhood.

=== Marceline ===
Marceline has an area of roughly half a square mile and is bordered by Walnut Street to the north, Orlando Road to the south, Hill Avenue to the west, and Allen Avenue to the east. The neighborhood is named for a short-lived railroad cutoff which ran through the center of the neighborhood at the turn of the 20th century. Pasadena City College is located in this neighborhood. The vast majority of commercial activity is centered on the PCC Campus, especially on Colorado Boulevard. There are no parks in the neighborhood, though Marceline borders the Huntington Library.

=== South Lake ===
South Lake is a retail district on Lake Avenue (Pasadena) between Colorado Boulevard and California Boulevard. It can also be used to refer to a neighborhood bordered by Colorado Boulevard to the north, the Pasadena–San Marino border to the south, Hudson Avenue to the west, and Hill Avenue to the east. California Institute of Technology, Grant Park, and Tournament Park are in this neighborhood.

Due to the location of Caltech, South Lake has been home to many in the scientific community.

- Albert Einstein, physicist
- Robert A. Millikan, physicist
- Jack Parsons, rocket scientist
- Amos G. Throop, Caltech founder, former Mayor of Pasadena.
- Fritz Zwicky, astronomer

South Lake is served by Hamilton Elementary School, McKinley School, Wilson Middle School, and Blair High School. Polytechnic School and St. Philip the Apostle School are private schools in the area.

== Southwest ==
Southwest Pasadena is the area of Pasadena south and west of the 134 Freeway, Downtown Pasadena and Marengo Avenue. This region is served by Metro Local line 180 and Pasadena Transit line 33. The Fillmore station of the Metro A line is located at the edge of this region.

=== Lower Arroyo ===
The Lower Arroyo is situated along the southwestern quadrant of the city and features a variety of architecture flanking the Arroyo Seco. The district is considered the heart of Pasadena's Arts & Crafts movement.

=== Annandale ===
Annandale is a former independent community that is now split between Pasadena and Los Angeles. The Pasadena portion is bordered by Colorado Boulevard to the north, San Rafael Avenue to the east, and the Pasadena-Los Angeles border to the south and west.

=== Poppy Peak ===
A portion of the Annandale neighborhood along Poppy Peak Drive, Kaweah Drive, Pleasant Way, and Cresthaven Drive was designated a historic district by the National Register of Historic Places in 2009. The neighborhood contains several examples of buildings designed by master modern architects.
