= East Washington Line =

East Washington

Overview
- Status: Defunct
- Owner: Pacific Electric
- Locale: Southern California
- Termini: Downtown Pasadena; East Washington Village
- Stations: 10

Service
- Type: Streetcar
- System: Pacific Electric
- Operator: Pacific Electric

History
- Opened: Unknown
- Closed: July 29, 1923

Technical
- Number of tracks: 1
- Track gauge: 1,435 mm (4 ft 8 1/2 in) standard gauge
- Electrification: Overhead line, 600 V DC

The East Washington Line was a local streetcar route of the United States Pacific Electric Railway serving Pasadena. It ran from Downtown Pasadena to East Washington Village, by way of Los Robles Avenue and Washington Boulevard. The extension to Tierra Alta opened in 1912. The line was abandoned after July 29, 1923. Service was thereafter provided by buses.
