= Allen station (Los Angeles Metro) =

Light rail station in Pasadena, California

Allen
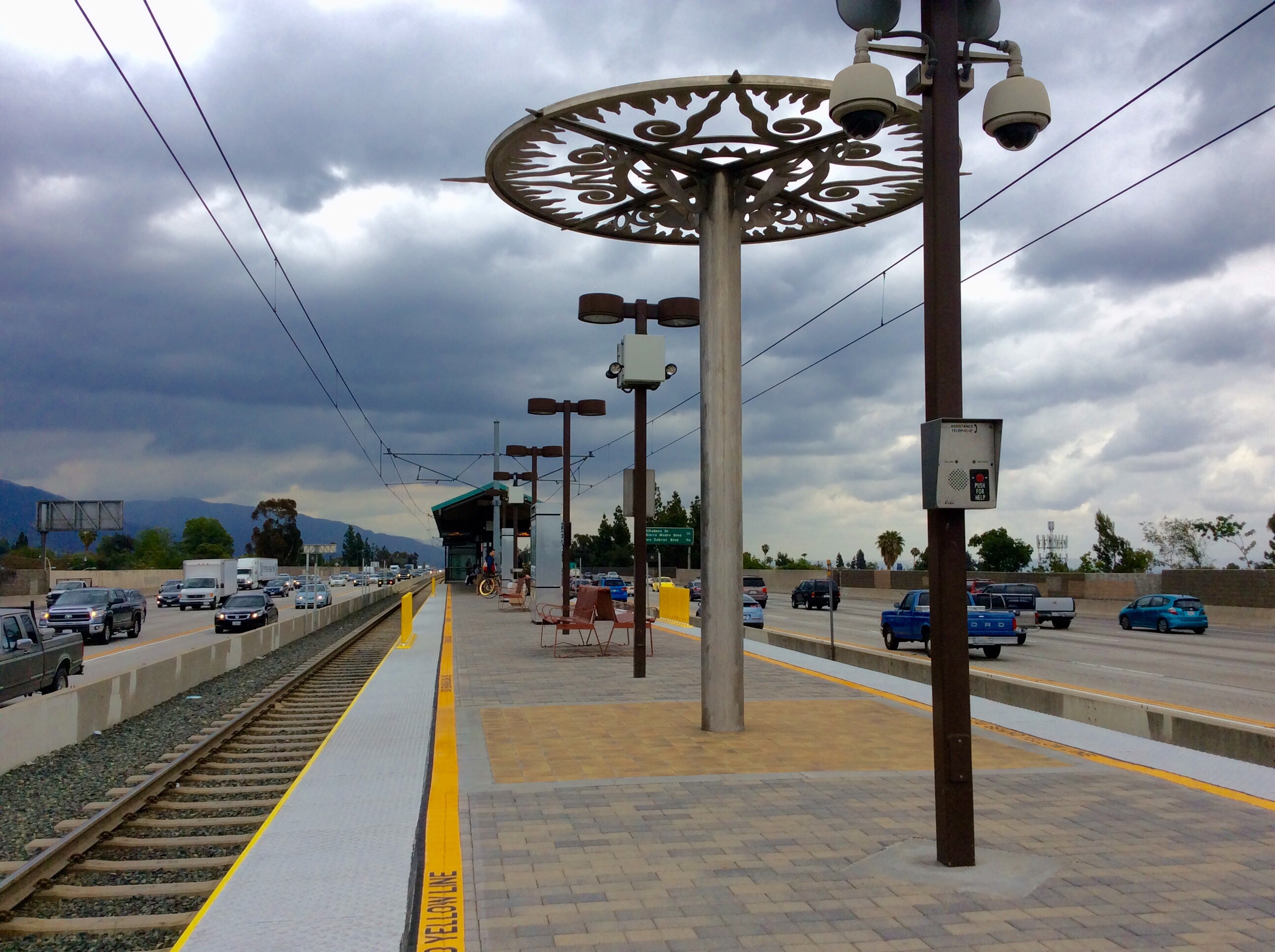
- Allen station platform

General information
- Other names: Allen/College
- Location: 395 North Allen Avenue; Pasadena, California
- Coordinates: 34.1518°N 118.1132°W
- Owner: Los Angeles Metro
- Platforms: 1 island platform
- Tracks: 2
- Connections: Los Angeles Metro Bus; Pasadena Transit; Pasadena City College Shuttle

Construction
- Structure type: Freeway median, elevated
- Cycle facilities: Racks
- Accessible: Yes

History
- Opened: July 26, 2003

Passengers
- FY 2026: 758 (avg. wkdy boardings)

Services
Preceding station	Metro Rail	Following station
Lake toward Long Beach	A Line	Sierra Madre Villa toward Pomona
Former services
Preceding station	Metro Rail	Following station
Lake toward East Los Angeles	L Line	Sierra Madre Villa toward Azusa
Location

Allen station is an elevated light rail station on the A Line of the Los Angeles Metro Rail system. It is located in the median of Interstate 210 (Foothill Freeway), above North Allen Avenue, after which the station is named, in Pasadena, California. The light rail station opened on July 26, 2003, as part of the original Gold Line, then known as the "Pasadena Metro Blue Line" project.

The station is also signed as Allen/College, for the nearby Pasadena City College, which operates shuttles between the station and its campuses.

It is one of the A Line stations near the Rose Parade route on Colorado Boulevard and is used by people coming to see the parade.

This station features an architectural design called Rider's Dream, created by artist Michael Amescua.

== Service ==
=== Hours and frequency ===
A Line service hours are from approximately 4:30 a.m. and 11:45 p.m. daily. Trains operate every 8 minutes during peak hours, Monday to Friday. Trains run every 10 minutes, during midday on weekdays and weekends, from 9:00 a.m. to 7:00 p.m. Night and early morning service is approximately every 20 minutes every day.

=== Connections ===
As of June 7, 2026, the following connections are available:

- Los Angeles Metro Bus: 267
- Pasadena Transit: 10, 40
- Pasadena City College Shuttle (students/staff only)

== Notable places nearby ==
The station is within walking distance of the following notable places:

- California Institute of Technology
- Pasadena City College main campus
- Pasadena Conservatory of Music
