= Pat Ward Williams =

American photographer

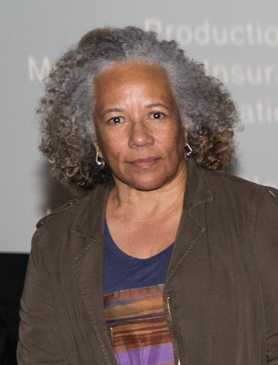
- Pat Ward Williams in 2014
- Born: 1948 (age 77–78)
- Education: Moore College of Art and Design (BFA); Maryland Institute College of Art (MFA)
- Known for: Photography; public art

Pat Ward Williams (born 1948) is an African-American photographer whose work engages with themes of race, gender, and history. In addition to her smaller-scale photographs and installations, she has designed three public artworks in Los Angeles.

Williams holds a BFA from Moore College of Art and Design (1982) and an MFA from the Maryland Institute College of Art (1987).

== Work ==
One of Williams’ best known works is Accused/Blowtorch/Padlock (1986), which consists of an image of a black man tied to a tree (originally published in Life magazine in 1937 and not attributed to a specific photographer), surrounded by text expressing the artist's reaction to this image. Williams enlarges certain aspects of the original image and encases them in an old window frame-like border to bring the viewer in as a witness. About the title, Williams explained: "I force the viewer to look at what is really going on [...] by directing with text what the viewer should notice: the tied hands (accused), the scarred back (blowtorch), and the lock, chain, and tree (padlock)." Art historian Dora Apel argues that in including the text of her own response to the image, Williams "attempts to define for the viewer the relationship between violence, spectacle, and public representation."

Accused/Blowtorch/Padlock has been included in exhibitions such as The Decade Show, a large-scale collaborative exhibition by the New Museum, Studio Museum in Harlem, and Museum of Contemporary Hispanic Art, as well as in Art, Women, California 1950–2000: Parallels and Intersections at the San Jose Museum of Art.

Williams was part of the Photo-Active Feminist Artists 1998–99 series, sponsored by the National Endowment for the Arts and the University of Michigan School of Art and Design and Women's Studies Program. The group of artists, which also included Paula Allen, Barbara Kruger, Susan Meiselas, Connie Samaras, Kathy Constantinides, Wendy Ewald, and Marilyn Zimmerman, were chosen for their engagement with social and political issues in their work and traveled to the University of Michigan to present their work to students and the community.

In 1992, Williams published the exhibition catalog Probable Cause, which contains a series of photographs shown at the Goldie Paley Gallery at Moore College of Art and Design.

== Public art ==
Williams has created three public artworks in Los Angeles. In 1995, she designed The Emperor of the Great 9th District, a memorial to Gilbert Lindsay installed at the Los Angeles Convention Center. The monument consists of three 10-foot high, triple-sided concrete pillars featuring a portrait of Lindsay at his desk. The image of Lindsay is made up of 104 smaller tiles that contain additional images of Lindsay with his family, staff, and other public figures, including Martin Luther King Jr.

Williams’ 2001 work Starbursts decorates the Hollywood and Highland Center. Inspired by the finale dance scene of Busby Berkeley’s 1934 film Dames, Williams created circular images that mimic the camera angles in the film. The photo-etched images are on black granite and can be seen on the upper and lower entrance plaza floors of the Dolby Theatre.

In 2003, Williams created the public artwork Everyday People for the Lake metro station in Los Angeles. The work consists of large photographs of local people mounted on colored glass panels.

== Teaching ==
Williams has taught photography at UC Irvine and as a visiting professor at the University of Hawaii at Manoa and Technikon Witwatersrand in Johannesburg. She taught at Florida State University.

== Personal ==
Williams' daughter, Janaya Williams, is a radio producer at National Public Radio in Washington, DC.
