= Lake station (Los Angeles Metro) =

Light rail station in Pasadena, California

Lake
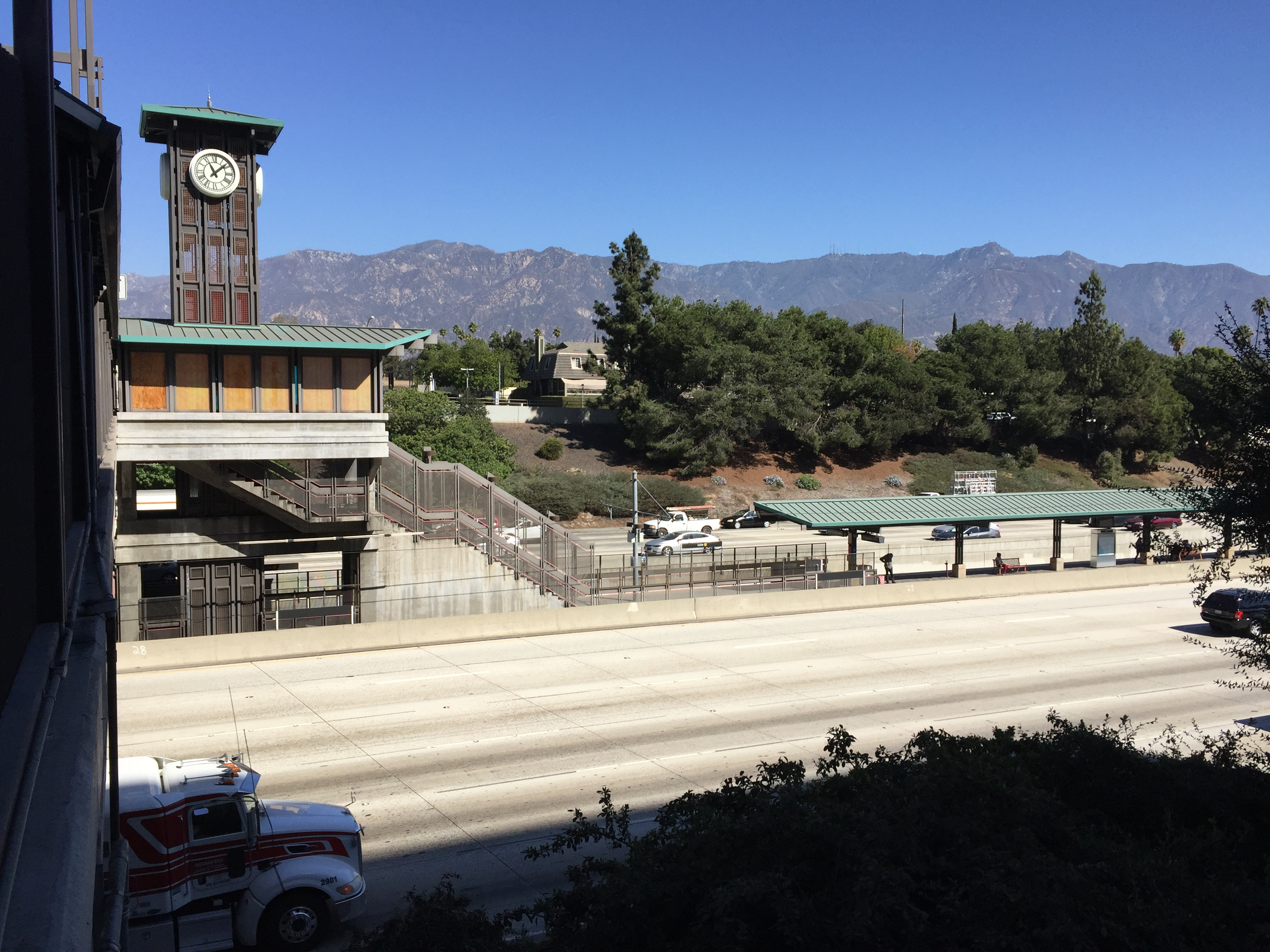
- Lake station sitting in the median of the 210, photographed in 2016

General information
- Location: 340 North Lake Avenue; Pasadena, California
- Coordinates: 34.1519°N 118.1324°W
- Owner: Los Angeles Metro
- Platforms: 1 island platform
- Tracks: 2
- Connections: Los Angeles Metro Bus; LADOT Commuter Express; Pasadena Transit

Construction
- Structure type: Freeway median, below-grade
- Parking: 22 spaces
- Cycle facilities: Racks
- Accessible: Yes

History
- Opened: July 26, 2003

Passengers
- FY 2025: 979 (avg. wkdy boardings)

Services
Preceding station	Metro Rail	Following station
Memorial Park toward Long Beach	A Line	Allen toward Pomona
Former services
Preceding station	Metro Rail	Following station
Memorial Park toward East Los Angeles	L Line	Allen toward Azusa
Preceding station	Atchison, Topeka and Santa Fe Railway	Following station
at AT&SF station
Pasadena toward Los Angeles	Main Line Via Pasadena, Pomona	Lamanda Park toward Chicago
Location

Lake station is a below-grade light rail station on the A Line of the Los Angeles Metro Rail system. It is located in the median of Interstate 210 (Foothill Freeway), below North Lake Avenue, after which the station is named, in Pasadena, California. The light rail station opened on July 26, 2003, as part of the original Gold Line, then known as the "Pasadena Metro Blue Line" project.

It is one of the A Line stations near the Rose Parade route on Colorado Boulevard and is used by people coming to see the parade on New Year's Day.

This station features station art called Everyday People, created by artist Pat Ward Williams. This station has a parking lot with 22 paid reserved spaces.

== Service ==
=== Hours and frequency ===
A Line service hours are from approximately 4:30 a.m. and 11:45 p.m. daily. Trains operate every 8 minutes during peak hours, Monday to Friday. Trains run every 10 minutes, during midday on weekdays and weekends, from 9:00 a.m. to 7:00 p.m. Night and early morning service is approximately every 20 minutes every day.

=== Connections ===
As of September 19, 2025, the following connections are available:

- Los Angeles Metro Bus: 662
- LADOT Commuter Express: 549
- Pasadena Transit: 20, 40

== Notable places nearby ==
The station is within walking distance of the following notable places:

- Pasadena Playhouse District
- Bungalow Heaven Landmark District
- Lake Avenue Church
