= Del Mar station =

Los Angeles Metro Rail station

Del Mar
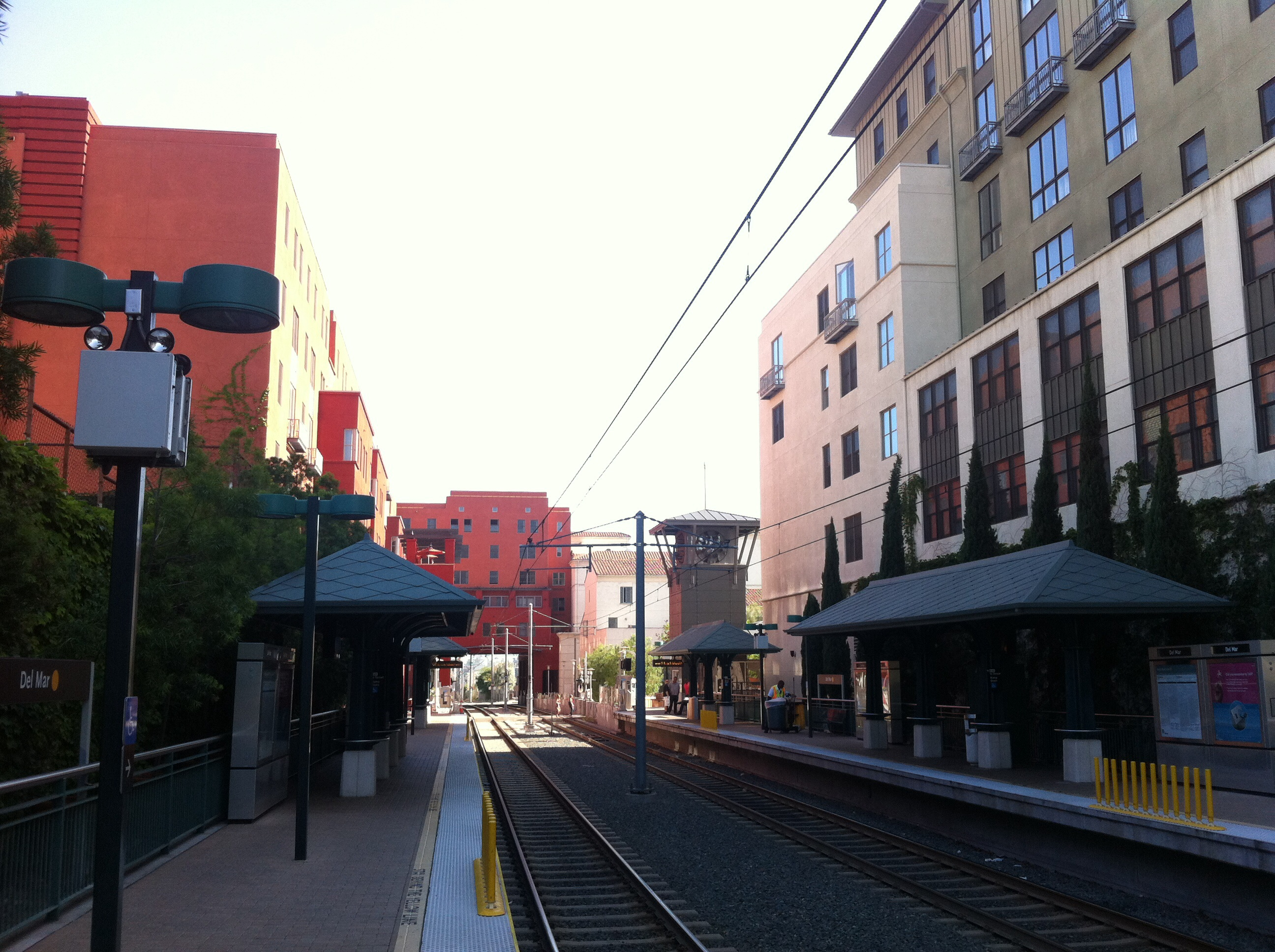
- Del Mar station platform in 2015

General information
- Location: 230 South Raymond Avenue; Pasadena, California
- Coordinates: 34.1426°N 118.1488°W
- Owner: Los Angeles County Metropolitan Transportation Authority
- Platforms: 2 side platforms
- Tracks: 2
- Connections: Amtrak Thruway; ArtCenter College of Design Shuttle; Foothill Transit; Los Angeles Metro Bus; Pasadena Transit

Construction
- Structure type: At-grade
- Parking: 610 spaces
- Cycle facilities: Racks and bike room
- Accessible: Yes
- Architect: Moule and Polyzoides

History
- Opened: 1887
- Rebuilt: 1935 (second station); 2003 (light rail station)
- Former names: Pasadena

Passengers
- FY 2025: 998 (avg. wkdy boardings)

Services
Preceding station	Metro Rail	Following station
Fillmore toward Long Beach	A Line	Memorial Park toward Pomona
Former services
Preceding station	Metro Rail	Following station
Fillmore toward East Los Angeles	L Line	Memorial Park toward Azusa
Preceding station	Amtrak	Following station
at AT&SF station
Los Angeles Terminus	Desert Wind 1979–1986	Pomona toward Chicago
Los Angeles Terminus	Southwest Chief 1984–1994	Pomona toward Chicago
Los Angeles Terminus	Southwest Limited 1974–1984	Pomona toward Chicago
Los Angeles Terminus	Super Chief 1971–1974	Pomona toward Chicago
Los Angeles Terminus	Las Vegas Limited 1976	Pomona toward Las Vegas
Preceding station	Atchison, Topeka and Santa Fe Railway	Following station
at AT&SF station
Raymond Hill toward Los Angeles	Main Line Via Pasadena, Pomona	Lake Avenue toward Chicago
La Grande Station To 1939 Terminus	Main Line Via Pasadena, Pomona	Lake Avenue toward Chicago
Location

Del Mar station is an at-grade light rail station on the A Line of the Los Angeles Metro Rail system. It is located between Arroyo Seco Parkway and Raymond Avenue at Del Mar Boulevard, after which the station is named, in Pasadena, California. The station is located on the site of the historic Pasadena Santa Fe Depot and the station building, built in 1935, still stands on the property.

The property surrounding the station, situated on the southern edge of Old Town Pasadena, has been used extensively for transit-oriented development projects, including one apartment building that was built over the tracks, creating a tunnel for trains.

The light rail station opened on July 26, 2003, as part of the original Gold Line, then known as the "Pasadena Metro Blue Line" project.

It is one of the stations near the Rose Parade route on Colorado Boulevard and is used by people coming to see the parade.

This station features station art called Kinetic Energy, created by artist Ries Niemi.

== History ==
=== Railroad station ===
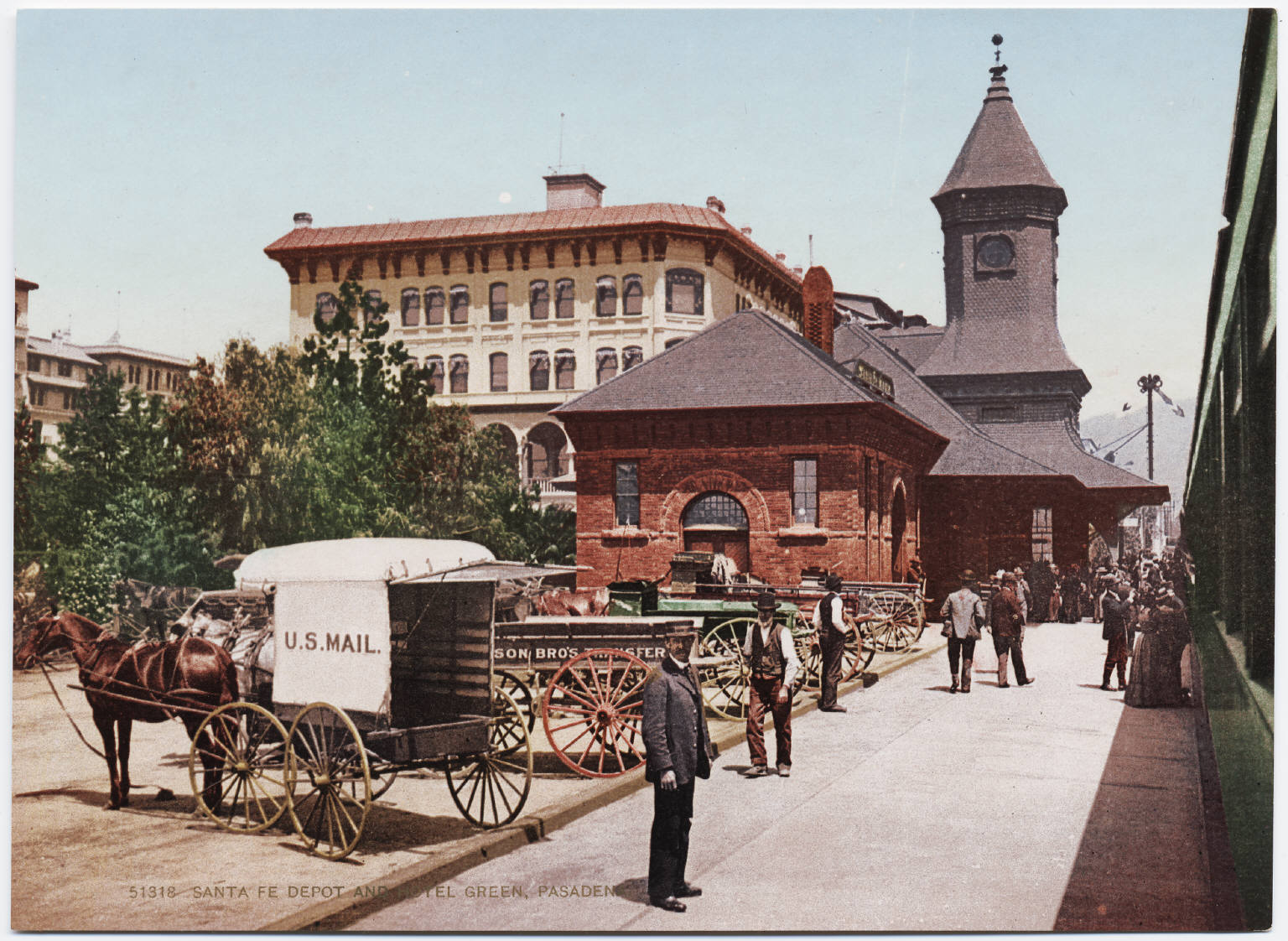
Original Victorian style station building

Pasadena became a stop on the Atchison, Topeka, and Santa Fe Railway’s transcontinental line in 1887. The first station was a Victorian-style building with a tower, weather vane, and scalloped shingles.

In 1935, a new station was built, this time a Spanish Mediterranean style, one-story white stucco building with green trim and a red-tile roof. The station was designed by architect H.C. Gilman and featured ceramic tile designed by Pasadena craftsman Ernest Batchelder.

Pasadena was a stop on the Santa Fe's Super Chief, Chief, El Capitan and other major intercity streamliners, and became a popular with wealthy Easterners who “wintered” in Pasadena, and elite Hollywood actors.

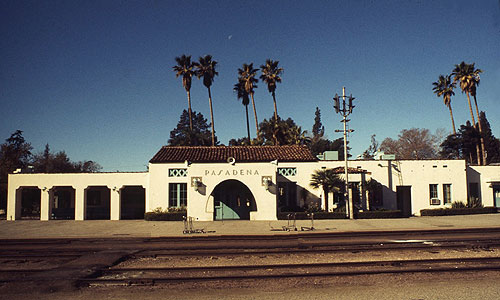
Southwestern style station building

Amtrak took over passenger train service from the Santa Fe on May 1, 1971, and leased the station building from the Santa Fe's real estate subsidiary, the Santa Fe Pacific Realty Corp., for its Southwest Chief and Desert Wind trains. The Desert Wind was re-routed via Fullerton on April 27, 1986.

=== Conversion to light rail ===
In the early 1990s, the Santa Fe agreed to sell the tracks through Pasadena as part of a larger deal with the Los Angeles County Metropolitan Transportation Authority, which would use the right of way to build the Gold Line, then known as the "Pasadena Metro Blue Line" project. Eastbound Southwest Chief service was rerouted to the San Bernardino Subdivision on November 28, 1993, followed by westbound service on January 15, 1994, ending Amtrak service to Pasadena and Pomona.

As construction was underway on the new light rail line, an agreement was reached to use the 4.4-acre (1.8 ha) site for a transit-oriented development project to include 347 apartments, a 1,200 space underground parking garage to be used by Metro passengers and the apartment renters, public courtyards, retail shops, and the historic Santa Fe Depot, which would be fully restored. The project was designed by Nadel Architects and Moule & Polyzoides.

To enable the construction of the underground parking garage, in November 2001, a preservation firm sliced the historic train station into three pieces and moved them across Raymond Avenue to be stored in Central Park. It was returned to the station site in September 2003 and reused as a space for a restaurant.

The underground parking garage opened in April 2003, the light rail line opened on July 26, 2003, and the commercial/residential development opened in June 2006.

=== Later changes ===
By 2007, Metro's 600 spaces in the underground parking garage were being underutilized. Most usage happened on weekdays and Metro still had enough excess capacity to rent spaces to a car dealership group. Meanwhile, the nearby parking garages for Old Town Pasadena shoppers were often full on weekends. In 2007, the City of Pasadena purchased Metro's share of the garage, opening it up to both commuters and shoppers.

The station became part of the A Line when the Regional Connector tunnel opened on June 16, 2023.

== Service ==
=== Hours and frequency ===
A Line service hours are from approximately 4:30 a.m. and 11:45 p.m. daily. Trains operate every 8 minutes during peak hours, Monday to Friday. Trains run every 10 minutes, during midday on weekdays and weekends, from 9:00 a.m. to 7:00 p.m. Night and early morning service is approximately every 20 minutes every day.

=== Connections ===
As of December 15, 2024, the following connections are available:

- Amtrak Thruway: 19 (four blocks, 1/2 mile (0.8 km) east at Hilton Pasadena, 168 South Las Robles Avenue)
- ArtCenter College of Design Shuttle (students/staff only)
- Foothill Transit: 187
- Los Angeles Metro Bus: 260, 267, 501 (NoHo-Pasadena Express), 660, 662
- Pasadena Transit: 20, 33, 51, 52
