= Pasadena Transit =

Bus system in Pasadena, California

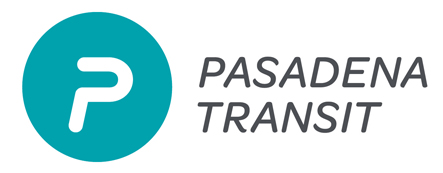

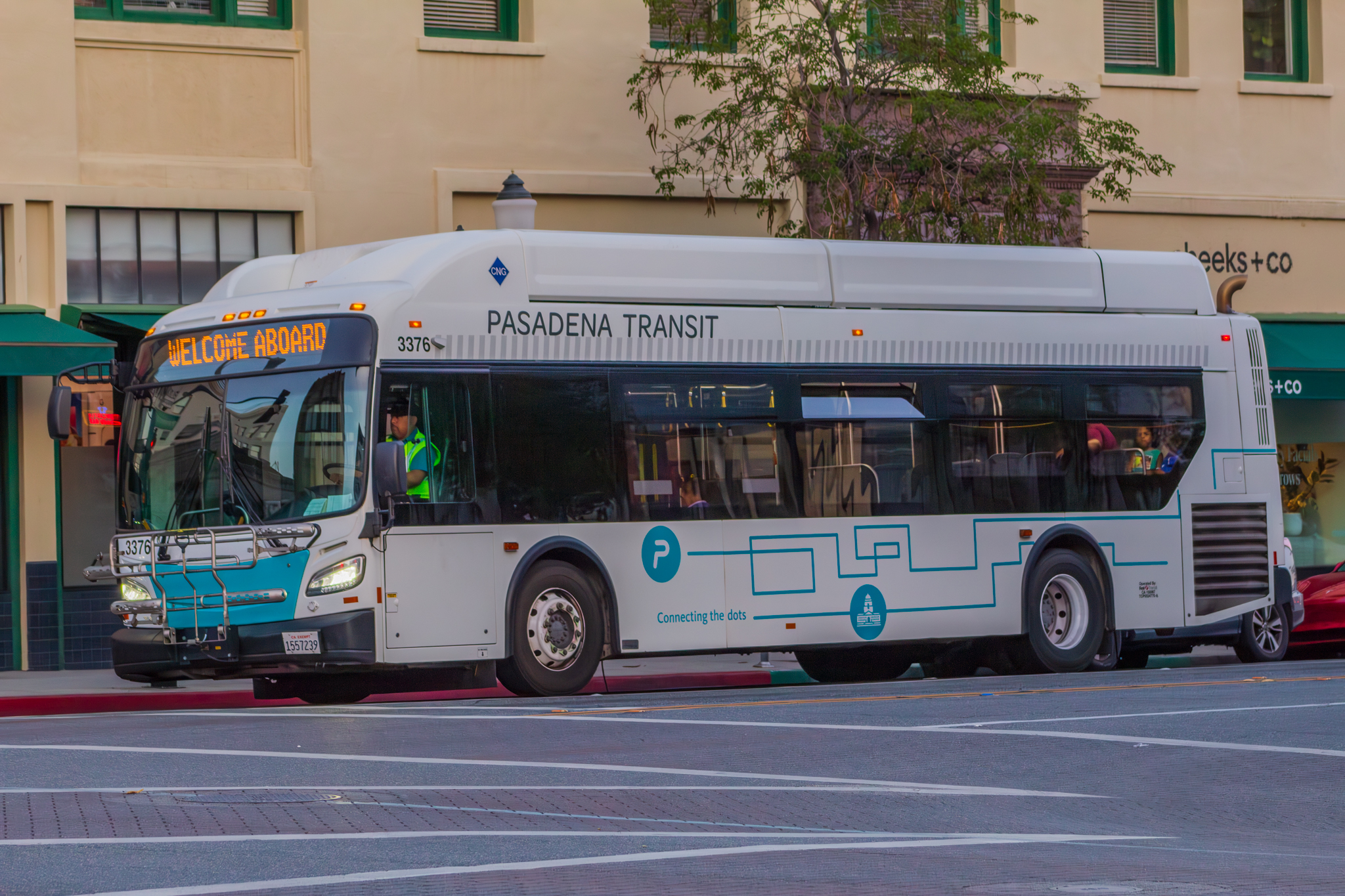
- Pasadena Transit bus in Old Town
- Parent: Pasadena Department of Transportation
- Founded: 1994
- Service area: Pasadena, California, southern portion of Altadena, California, Highland Park, La Cañada Flintridge
- Service type: Bus service
- Routes: 11
- Fleet: 32
- Annual ridership: 1,601,391 (FY16)
- Fuel type: CNG, battery electric
- Operator: Transdev
- Website: cityofpasadena.net/pasadena-transit

Pasadena Transit, formerly known as Pasadena Area Rapid Transit System (Pasadena ARTS), is the transit bus service in the city of Pasadena, California. The system was launched as a single shuttle route ahead of the 1994 FIFA World Cup at the Rose Bowl. The system greatly expanded in 2001 and ahead of the opening of the Metro Gold Line (now known as the A Line) in 2003. As of December 2024, the system consists of eleven lines, which are operated under contract by Transdev, with a fleet of 32 buses.

== History ==
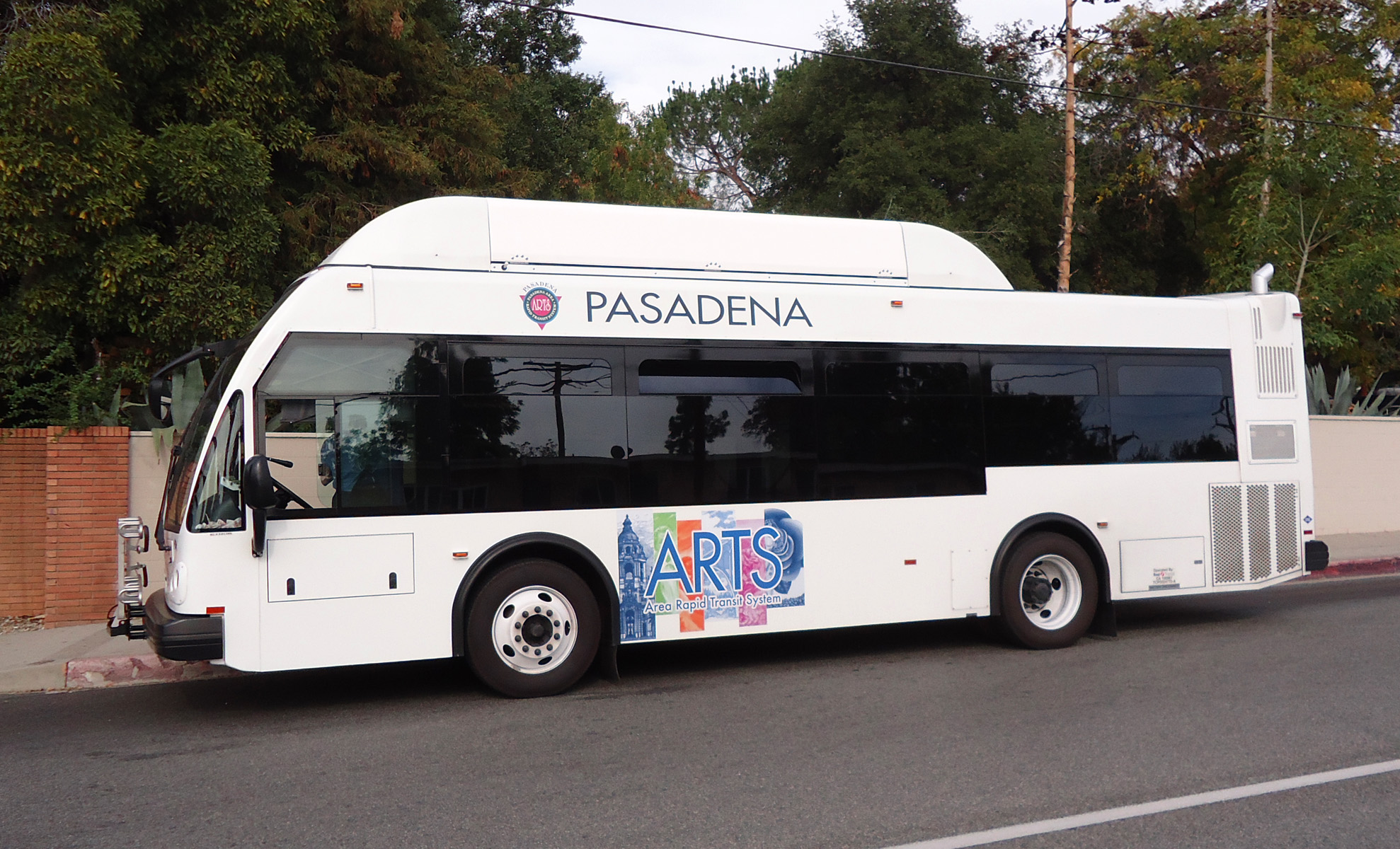
Bus in former ARTS design

Pasadena launched its transit bus system in June 1994, in time for the 1994 FIFA World Cup, held at Pasadena's Rose Bowl stadium. Known as the Pasadena Area Rapid Transit System (ARTS), it consisted of a single fare-free shuttle line called the Downtown Route, which connected Old Pasadena, Civic Center, Playhouse District, and South Lake Business District.

A second route was added in mid-1996, connecting to the Downtown Route at Old Pasadena; the new Uptown Route served residents in the northwest and eastern areas of Pasadena, connecting them with the Civic Center, the North Lake shopping area, and also serving the high-density senior housing along Villa.

In 2001, anticipating the opening of the Metro Gold Line (now known as the A Line) in 2003, Pasadena restructured the transit system to serve the six new light rail stations. ARTS was restructured into four routes in 2001, which are operated today as Lines 10, 20, 31/32, and 40. Two additional routes were added in June 2003: Routes 51/52 and 60.

When the Gold Line opened in July 2003, Pasadena ARTS also began charging a 50-cent fare, which allowed the agency to enter into interagency transfer agreements that enabled ARTS riders to transfer onto the Gold Line or buses from other agencies for an extra 25 cents.

In 2010, the Great Recession that was being felt around the nation also impacted Pasadena's budget, forcing the city to cut service, including the elimination of Sunday service; in addition, the aging vehicles dragged down the agency's on-time performance into the low-80% range, and ridership fell by 13% that year. Federal grants allowed Pasadena ARTS to modify Route 10 and increase Route 20 frequency in July 2013; additional service improvements included an increase in Route 31 frequency in fall 2015 and the resumption of Sunday service in July 2018.

The service was rebranded as Pasadena Transit starting on December 1, 2015. The new logo and branding materials were developed by students at Pasadena's ArtCenter College of Design.

On December 15, 2024, Pasadena Transit adds two new bus lines, Los Angeles Metro Bus Line 177 becomes Line 53 (Jet Propulsion Laboratory/Caltech) which operates on weekday rush hours and Metro Bus Line 256 becomes Line 33 (Sierra Madre Villa Station/Highland Park Station via Washington Boulevard/Colorado Boulevard/Avenue 64), which operates seven days a week, as part of the agency's NextGen Bus plan.

== Routes ==
=== Local routes ===
Pasadena Transit operates 11 routes, each connecting with at least one Metro A Line station. Four of the lines (10, 51/52, 53, and 60) are classified as "Feeder" lines, which connect low-density residential neighborhoods to work and shopping destinations and other modes of transit. The other five lines (20, 31/32, 33, and 40) are "Local" lines, connecting Metro stations with the city's attractions and high-density residential neighborhoods.

Route 20 is the busiest in the system, with nearly 2.5 times the daily boardings as the next-highest route operated by Pasadena Transit, 31/32.

Route	Terminals		via	Notes
10	Old Pasadena; Green St & Terrace Dr	Pasadena; Allen station	Colorado Bl, Del Mar Bl, Allen Av	Serves Caltech and Pasadena City College.; Also serves Memorial Park station.
20	Altadena; Fair Oaks Av & Woodbury Rd		Woodbury Rd, Lake Av, California Bl, Fair Oaks Av	Operates clockwise and counter-clockwise.; Serves Del Mar, Fillmore, Lake and Memorial Park stations.
31	Altadena; Fair Oaks Av & Woodbury Rd	Pasadena; Sierra Madre Villa station	Washington Bl, Altadena Dr, Foothill Blvd	
32	Altadena; Fair Oaks Av & Woodbury Rd	Pasadena; Sierra Madre Villa station	Washington Bl, New York Dr, Sierra Madre Villa Av	
33	Highland Park; Highland Park station	Pasadena; Sierra Madre Villa station	Av 64, Colorado Bl, Washington Bl, Orange Grove Bl	Also serves Memorial Park station.
40	Old Pasadena; Green St & Arroyo Pkwy	Pasadena; Sierra Madre Villa station	Villa St, Orange Grove Bl, Rosemead Bl	Also serves Allen and Memorial Park stations.
51	Pasadena; Art Center College of Design	Pasadena; Raymond Av & Glenarm St	Linda Vista Av, Raymond Av	Operates on weekdays only.; Serves Rose Bowl Stadium.; Serves Del Mar, Fillmore and Memorial Park stations.
51s	Pasadena; Rose Bowl Stadium	Pasadena; Memorial Park station	Fair Oaks Av, Raymond Av, Seco St	Operates on weekends only.
52	Pasadena; Raymond Av & Glenarm St		Raymond Av, Linda Vista Av	Serves Jet Propulsion Laboratory; To Art Center College of Design
53	La Cañada Flintridge; Jet Propulsion Laboratory	Pasadena; Caltech	I-210, Fair Oaks Av, Raymond Av, Del Mar Bl	Operates Weekday peak hours only.; Serves Del Mar and Memorial Park stations.
60	Pasadena; Pasadena City College	Hastings Ranch; Sierra Madre Bl & Michillinda Av	Del Mar Bl, Hastings Ranch Dr	Operates Weekday peak hours only.; Serves Sierra Madre Villa station.

=== Days of operation ===
Pasadena Transit operates seven days a week. Except for Route 33, service does not operate on major holidays (New Year's Day, Memorial Day, Independence Day, Labor Day, Thanksgiving Day and Christmas Day).

=== Dial-a-ride service ===
In addition to its fixed routes, Pasadena Transit also operates an on-demand ("dial-a-ride") service for senior and disabled residents in the city of Pasadena and neighboring communities in Altadena, San Marino, and unincorporated Los Angeles County. The Dial-a-Ride service started in 1984 and began serving San Marino residents in 1989. Areas of Kinneloa and East San Gabriel were added in 1990, and Altadena joined in 1993.

== Fares ==
Fares may be paid in cash. In September 2015, Pasadena Transit began participating in the regional TAP card farecard program. Passes are kept on the TAP card. Pasadena Transit will honor the regional EZ Transit Pass and all Metrolink tickets as full fare. Youth, senior, and disabled riders must use an appropriate Reduced Fare TAP Card in conjunction with an appropriate ID. Up to two children ages five and under may ride for free with one paid Full (adult) fare.

Initially, the base fare was 50 cents (youth and discount riders: 25 cents) when Pasadena ARTS began collecting fares in July 2003. The transfer fee to another transit agency was an additional 25 cents.

Fares were raised in 2009 to 75 cents (adult), 50 cents (youth), and 35 cents (discount). Passengers who pay with cash stored on a TAP Card, can ride for 2.5 hours, and will get discounted inter-agency transfers.

== Bus fleet and facilities ==
The six original buses when Pasadena ARTS began were wrapped in a distinct design, themed for the Visual Arts, Symphony, New Year's Day, Historical Landmarks, and Multicultural; they were billed as "Art that really moves you". In 2006, the bus livery was redesigned to incorporate each of the six original designs as a unified pattern for all buses. The first major replacement of the fleet was completed by 2013.

Pasadena Transit is managed by the city's Department of Transportation and is housed in a building at 221 E Walnut St. Operations and maintenance are handled by contractors using a leased facility at 303 North Allen Avenue. There are two additional lots for overflow parking and bus storage.
