= Park Place–Arroyo Terrace Historic District =

Historic house in California, United States

- U.S. National Register of Historic Places
- U.S. Historic district
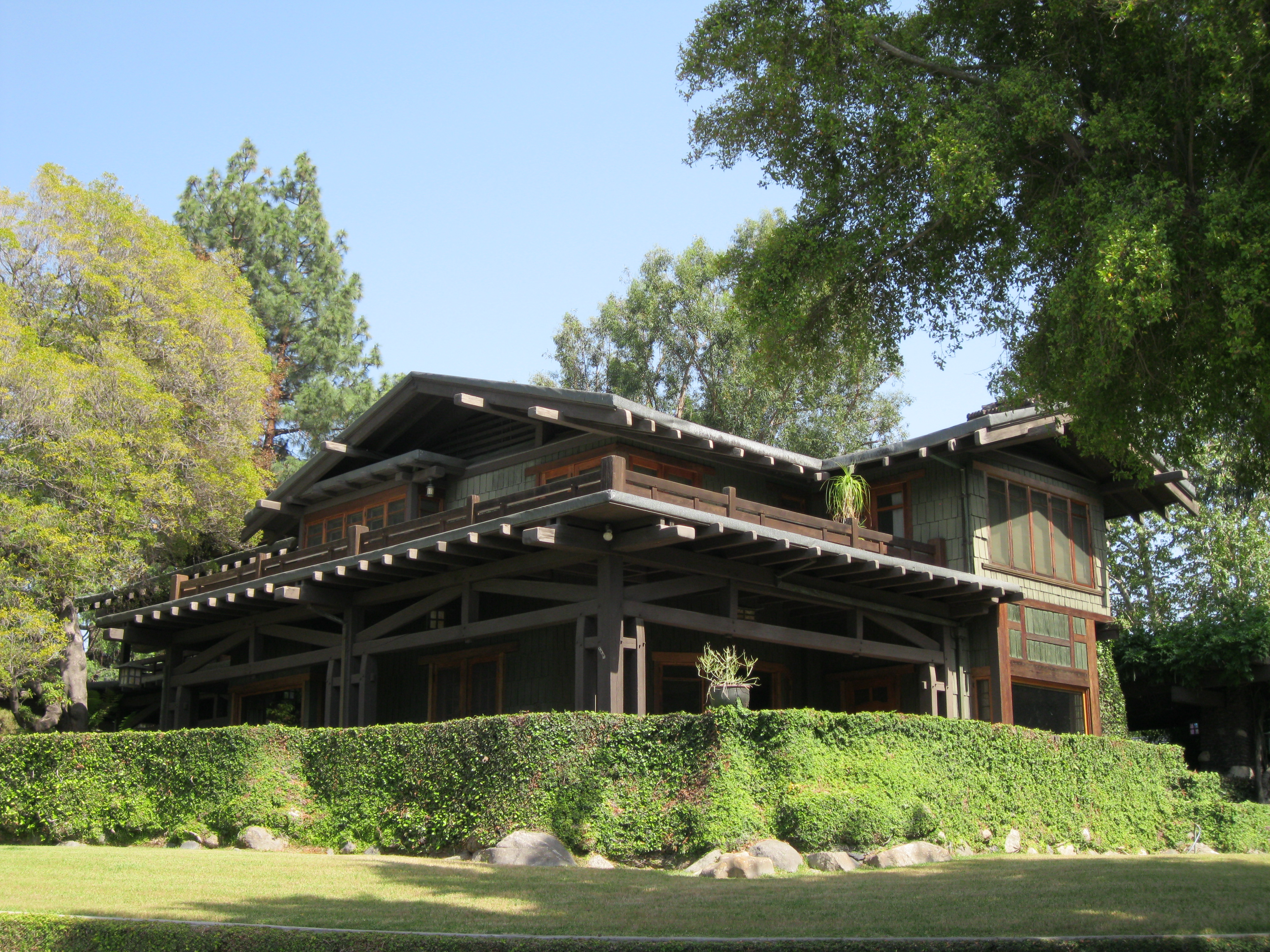
- Duncan-Irwin House at 240 N. Grand Ave.

- Location within the Los Angeles metropolitan area Location within California Location within the United States
- Location: 368-440 Arroyo Terrace, 200-240 N. Grand Ave., 201-239 N. Orange Grove Blvd., Pasadena, California
- Coordinates: 34°8′58″N 118°9′44″W
- Area: 7.5 acres (3.0 ha)
- Architectural style: Arts and Crafts Movement
- MPS: Residential Architecture of Pasadena: Influence of the Arts and Crafts Movement MPS
- NRHP reference No.: 04000324
- Added to NRHP: June 29, 2007

The Park Place–Arroyo Terrace Historic District is a residential historic district located in northwest Pasadena, California, United States. The district includes eleven contributing houses built from 1902 to 1912. Most of the houses in the district were influenced by the Arts and Crafts Movement, which was popular in Pasadena in the early 20th century; particular styles in the district include the American Craftsman house, the Craftsman bungalow, the Colonial Revival house, and the Prairie School house. Prominent Pasadena architects Charles and Henry Greene designed seven of the district's houses; the district is the most concentrated collection of their works in Pasadena. Two other noted Craftsman architects, Myron Hunt and Sylvanus Marston, also designed homes in the district, including Hunt's own residence.

The district was added to the National Register of Historic Places on June 29, 2007.
