= Sierra Madre Villa station =

Light rail station in Pasadena, California

Sierra Madre Villa
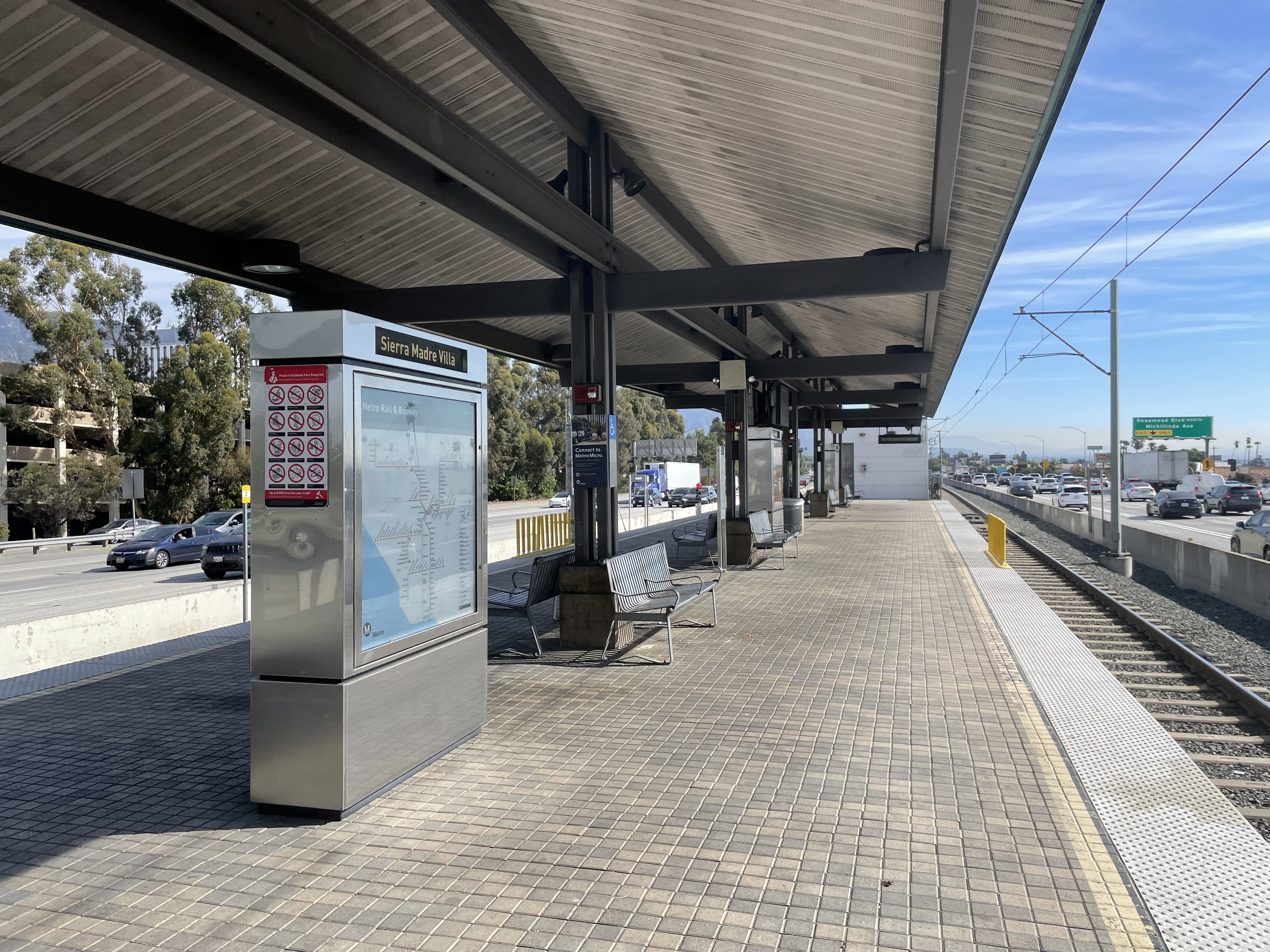
- Sierra Madre Villa station platform

General information
- Location: 149 North Halstead Street; Pasadena, California
- Coordinates: 34.1478°N 118.0813°W
- Owner: Los Angeles Metro
- Platforms: 1 island platform
- Tracks: 2
- Connections: Foothill Transit; Los Angeles Metro Bus; Pasadena Transit

Construction
- Structure type: Freeway median, at-grade
- Parking: 965 spaces
- Cycle facilities: Racks and lockers
- Accessible: Yes

History
- Opened: July 26, 2003

Passengers
- FY 2025: 1,024 (avg. wkdy boardings)

Services
Preceding station	Metro Rail	Following station
Allen toward Long Beach	A Line	Arcadia toward Pomona
Former services
Preceding station	Metro Rail	Following station
Allen toward East Los Angeles	L Line	Arcadia toward Azusa
Location

Sierra Madre Villa station is an at-grade light rail station on the A Line of the Los Angeles Metro Rail system. It is located in the median of Interstate 210 (Foothill Freeway), at Sierra Madre Villa Avenue, in Pasadena, California. The light rail station opened on July 26, 2003, as the northern terminus of the original Gold Line, then known as the "Pasadena Metro Blue Line" project. The station, under naming schemes, is named for Sierra Madre Villa Avenue rather than the nearby city of Sierra Madre, although the major thoroughfare leads to Sierra Madre.

The station has a 965 space, five-floor parking garage, accessed from Sierra Madre Villa Avenue and North Halstead Street. The first floor of the parking garage has a multi-bay bus plaza, and the fourth floor has the train platform access, with faregates, ticket vending machines, and a pedestrian bridge, which passes over the westbound lanes of the Foothill Freeway.

Sierra Madre Villa was the Gold Line's northern terminus from 2003 until 2016. Service on the first phase of the Gold Line Foothill Extension Project began on March 5, 2016, which extended the line to APU/Citrus College station.

== Service ==
=== Hours and frequency ===
A Line service hours are from approximately 4:30 a.m. and 11:45 p.m. daily. Trains operate every 8 minutes during peak hours, Monday to Friday. Trains run every 10 minutes, during midday on weekdays and weekends, from 9:00 a.m. to 7:00 p.m. Night and early morning service is approximately every 20 minutes every day.

=== Connections ===
As of September 19, 2025, the following connections are available:

- Foothill Transit: 187
- Los Angeles Metro Bus: 266, 268, Express 487
- Pasadena Transit: 31, 32, 33, 40, 60

== Notable places nearby ==
The station is within walking distance of the following notable places:

- A Noise Within Theater
- Kaiser Permanente Pasadena Medical Offices
- Hastings Ranch Plaza
- Hastings Village Shopping Center
- Pasadena City College Foothill campus

== Station artwork ==
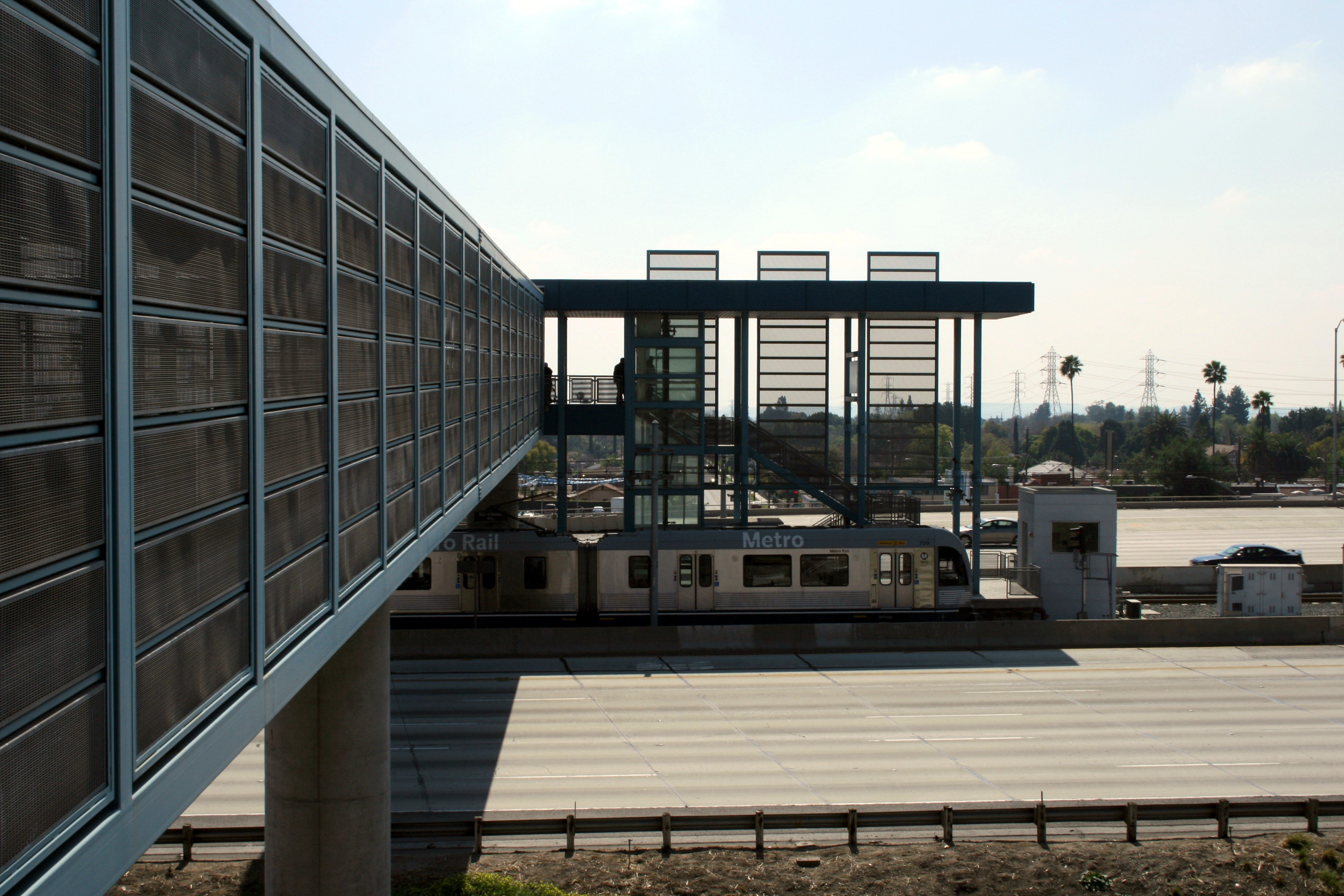
The majority of the station is painted in a light blue color.

Sierra Madre Villa station was designed by artist Tony Gleaton. Its structure features large photo portraits that are suspended above the platform access stairways. The pedestrian bridge, as well as the structural beams and posts of the station, are painted in a blue color scheme. The portraits feature local inhabitants, reflecting the area's diversity and differences each person has. The station's 965-space parking structure was designed by artist Beth Thielen, which follows a theme of "nature and movement".
