= Old Pasadena =

- Old Pasadena Historic District
- U.S. National Register of Historic Places
- U.S. Historic district
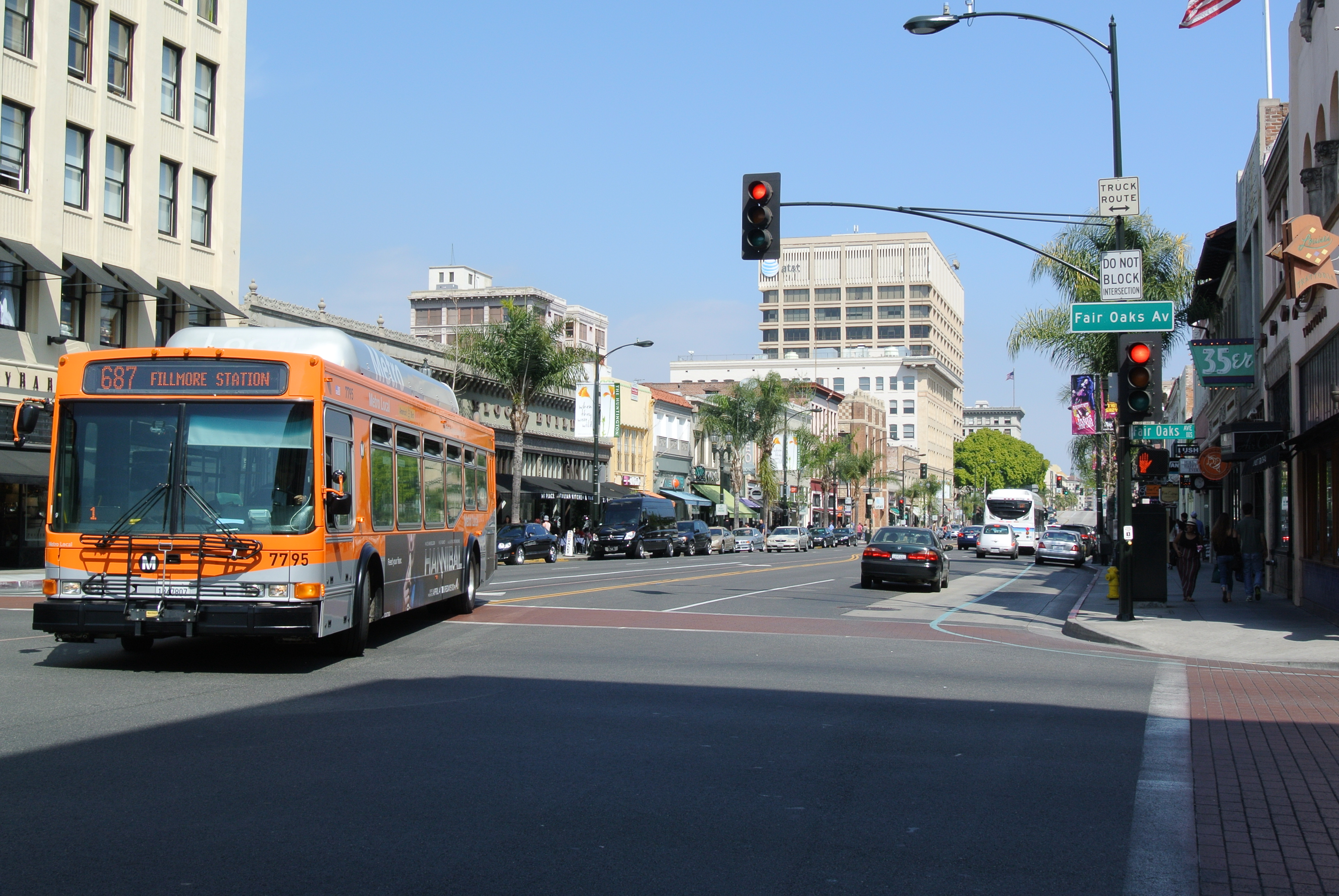
- Old Pasadena (intersection Fair Oaks Ave and Colorado Blvd) and Metro Local bus, 2013

- Location within the Los Angeles metropolitan area Location within California Location within the United States
- Interactive map showing the location for Old Pasadena
- Location: Roughly bounded by Interstate 210, Fair Oaks, Raymond Aves., Arroyo Pkwy., Del Mar Blvd., and S.R. 134.
- Coordinates: 34.145757°N 118.15047°W
- NRHP reference No.: 83001200
- Added to NRHP: September 15, 1983

Old Pasadena, often referred to as Old Town Pasadena or simply Old Town, is the original commercial center of Pasadena, a city in California, United States, and had a latter-day revitalization after a period of decay.

Old Pasadena began as the center of a research hub where science and research institutions such as Caltech and the Jet Propulsion Laboratory, and companies such as Beckman Instruments and Aerojet, were founded. The large concentration of such companies in the area gave it the nickname "Athens of the West".

The area was also an artistic center, the home to Andy Warhol's West Coast museum debut and the first Marcel Duchamp retrospective, both at the Pasadena Art Museum (one of the earliest modern art museums in the country, now the Norton Simon Museum). Before that, Pasadena was a center of suffragist and pacifist movements and other liberal causes. By the late 1940s, the downtown area was blighted by flophouses, dive bars and pawn shops. It later became a hippie destination, with head shops, adult bookstores and massage parlors. By the late 1980s, Old Pasadena was undergoing a period of urban renewal and regeneration.

== History ==
=== Fair Oaks and Colorado Boulevard ===
Old Pasadena's center is the postal zero/zero intersection for the city of Pasadena at Fair Oaks Avenue (N-S) and Colorado Boulevard (E-W). The first of the businesses of the original Indiana Colony were established at old Pasadena. J. D. Hollingsworth's general store served as the main supplier for the town as well as the post office when mail arrived from Los Angeles.

On the northwest corner was the Grand Hotel, in a building originally owned by Barney Williams, where the Williams family had run a general store on the ground floor. On the southwest corner (1 Fair Oaks Avenue) stood Williams Hall, also owned by the Williams family; this building was re-modeled in 1902 and became known as the Dodsworth Building, and now houses the Dodsworth Hotel.

The first meeting of Masons in Pasadena, later to become Pasadena Masonic Lodge No. 272, took place on 20 February 1883. A meeting in the library hall followed in October, at which the newly elected officials decided to make Williams Hall their permanent meeting place. An ornate front, similar to the facade of the present lodge, was erected on the upper story of the Colorado Boulevard building by H. Ridgway, an architect who was Master of the lodge in 1886. The Lodge continued to grow, and by 1917 it encompassed three separate lodges and fourteen affiliated bodies.

From the 1940s until the early 1970s, the Dodsworth Building, still displaying the masonic compass symbol on the inscribed stone in front of the building on its lower sides, contained a five-story furniture store belonging to Harry Steinberg and his son Albert Philip Steinberg, a 32nd degree mason and Shriner; that cornerstone now sits at the southwest corner of the Pasadena Masonic Temple at 200 S. Euclid Avenue.

=== Schoolhouse Block ===
In its infancy, the Indiana Colony was a quiet farming community centered around Orange Grove Boulevard, about a half mile west of Fair Oaks Avenue. Fair Oaks Avenue, just south of Colorado Boulevard, became the site of a new school, the Fair Oaks schoolhouse, a gift from Benjamin "Don Benito" Wilson. Fearing for the safety of children, the council of city fathers sought to move the schoolhouse away from the developing center of the town and its bustling activity, but Benjamin Wilson had died and his estate had passed to family members still living in the area. The council sought permission from the family on the understanding that the school would be moved immediately for the benefit of the children, but an improved school would be established somewhere outside Old Pasadena soon thereafter. The block of Fair Oaks Avenue, Colorado Boulevard, Raymond Avenue, and Green Street retained the name "schoolhouse block."

No record of the subsequent location of the school was retained in the records, but the location of the new school can be drawn from several historical accounts. Hiram Reid's History of Pasadena (1895) states that the schoolhouse was "moved several feet east to a frontage on Raymond 500 feet north of a line parallel to the north wall of the Post Office building." In 1895 the Post Office was in the Morgan Block just north of Kansas Street (Green Street). Reid goes on to say that "a beautiful new edifice stands there now," a reference to the Van der Vort building, built in 1894, replacing the schoolhouse. Eventually that building was sold to someone who moved it away for a residence, and a new Wilson School was later built outside of Old Pasadena, 4.2 miles to the east on Del Mar Boulevard and Madre Street.

Downtown Pasadena is currently served by Roosevelt, San Rafael, and McKinley Elementary Schools; Blair, and McKinley Middle Schools;, and Blair International Baccalaureate School. Maranatha High School is a Christian school in the area.

=== Castle Green ===
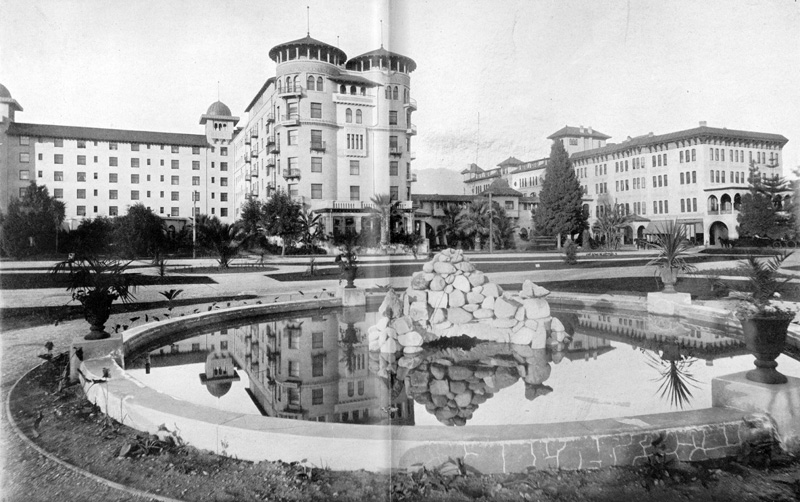
the Castle Green

As Pasadena's population grew in the late 19th and early 20th century, grand hotels were built which established Pasadena's national reputation as a winter tourist destination for the wealthy. In 1887 Edward C. Webster began construction of a hotel at 1929 Green Street, on the southeast corner of Raymond Avenue and Kansas Street. When he was unable to complete the job, a newcomer to the area, Colonel George Gill Green, took over the construction and finished the Green Hotel, which opened in 1888.

Green was a friend of Andrew McNally, a prominent printer from Chicago who had moved West and made his home in Altadena. McNally had invited Green to come out and join him in this new community. Together Green and McNally invested heavily in the short-lived Altadena Railroad, which provided them private sidings at their residences and which Green rode daily to the construction site of his new hotel. Green and Andrew McNally were next door neighbors on Mariposa Street just west of Lake Avenue. The McNally home still stands and the old Green carriage house remains in use as a residence, and is visible from the rear parking lot of the Altadena Library, which stands on the site of the Green house.

The new Green Hotel was a 6-story edifice that faced Central Park on South Raymond, just north of the original Victorian Pasadena Train Station, where trains stopped between Chicago and Los Angeles. That station was replaced by the current station, in the Southwestern style.

In 1898, Green built a grander Mediterranean style hotel on the opposite side of Raymond. The first became referred to as the annex, and the second became the winter home for some of the most prominent industrial magnates in the Eastern United States. The two buildings were connected by a bridge across Raymond, and a tunnel under it. Guests arriving by train would pass through the annex, to the second floor, and be trammed across the bridge. In the main residence they would retire to their suites, and the luggage would follow via the tunnel. Many of the servants and attendants of the guests were forced to find accommodation in the adjacent buildings. In 1902 a new wing of the hotel was built along Kansas (now Green) Street to the P.G. Wooster Block, home of Throop University (forerunner to Caltech).

In 1924 the hotel was converted into residential apartments. The original building (annex) was razed to its first floor. All that is left of that original hotel is a portico on the corner of Raymond and Green. The building is now owned by Stats Floral Supply. In 1970, the U.S. government's Department of Housing and Urban Development acquired the 1902 wing and separated the buildings into the Green Hotel on Green and the Castle Green on Raymond.

=== Other developments ===
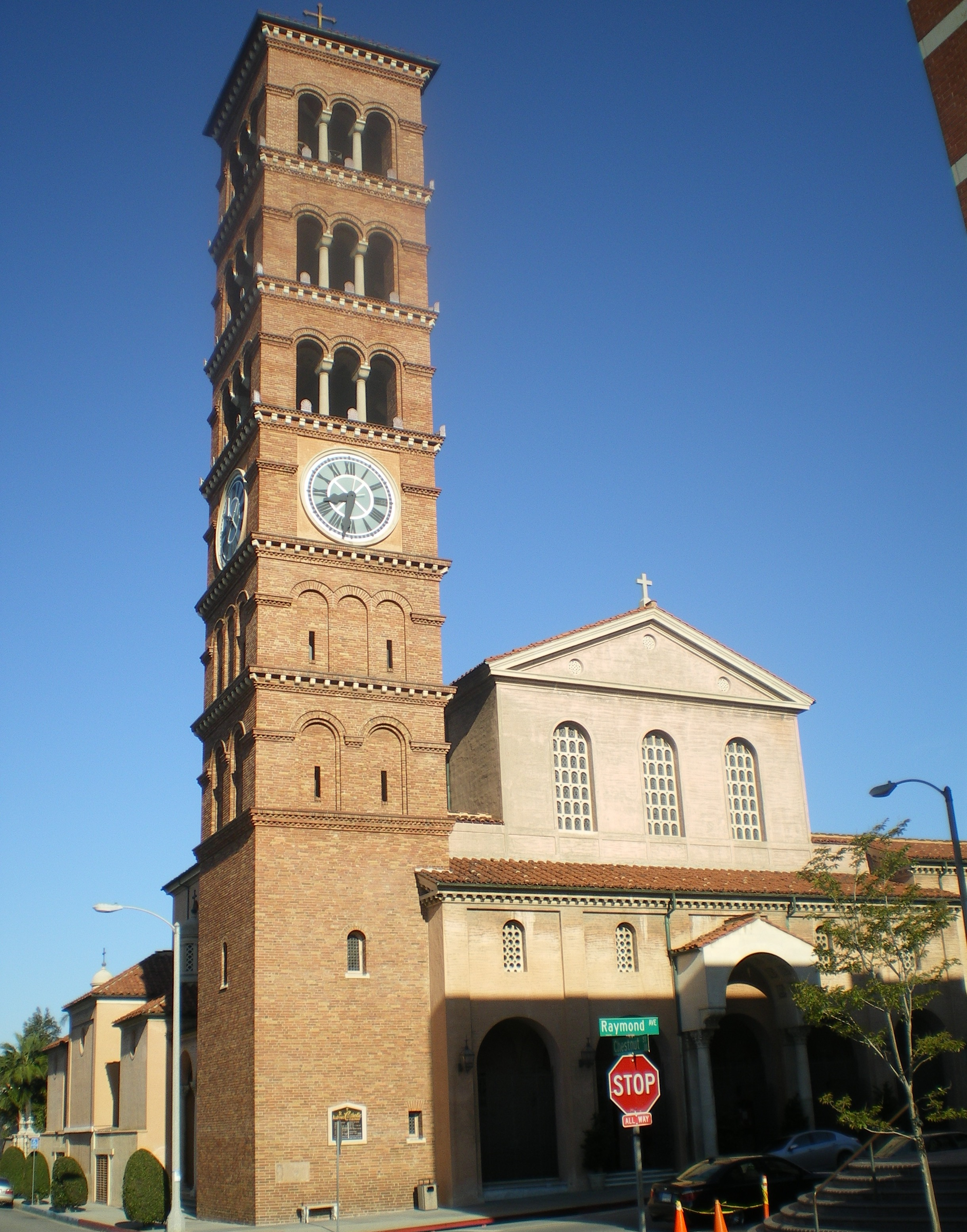
St. Andrew's Catholic Church on Raymond Avenue and Chestnut Street

In 1887, a Chicago land speculator named Morgan built a three-story block next to the site of the County Jail. In 1895, John Woodbury built a modest office building for himself which he shared with Jared S. Torrance. This building was replaced by the Marsh Block in 1902, which took up the whole corner lot of Raymond and Kansas south of the Morgan. In 1894 Van der Vort constructed the building that still bears his name at 32 S. Raymond. In 1889, Robert MacComber built the MacComber block on the northwest corner of Raymond and Kansas. In 1906 Braley built a bike manufacturing building, which eventually became an Oldsmobile dealership.

In 1887, a three-story Victorian red-brick building with bay windows and a turret on the southeast corner was constructed at 107 South Fair Oaks on the northwest corner at Dayton Street. It was named the "Doty Block" and housed a stagecoach showroom. In later years, it became The Mikado Hotel, which served the Japanese-American community. It became a freight depot for the Pasadena and Los Angeles Railroad, which later became part of the Pacific Electric Railway. Above the second floor windows on the south wall, the faint lettering "Pasadena and Los Angeles" that advertised that service can be seen today.

During the 1900s to the 1940s, Downtown Pasadena went through rapid change as the city's population was continuously growing. Despite The Depression that occurred in the 1930s, Downtown Pasadena continued developing. Its hotels were converted into industrial, manufacturing and research offices. The transition of Downtown Pasadena from a tourist destination to an industrial site allowed for the area to continue its expansion and growth.

In the 1940s, the building became Pasadena's first black-owned hotel, the Hotel Carver, when it was purchased and operated by Percy Clark and his sons Percy Jr., Robert and Littleton. In the basement was a prominent jazz club known first as the Onyx Club and later as the Cobra Club. In 1970, the hotel was sold and the building was converted into artist and performance studios. Over the next fifteen years, hundreds of artists, musicians, writers, dancers and filmmakers rented space at the Hotel Carver. The building was best known during this period for the John Bull English Pub, operated by Danny and Denise Sharp, and for the quirky word mural by Paul Waszink on the north wall reading: "My people are the people of the dessert," said T.E. Lawrence, picking up his fork. Several art shows were held in the third-floor ballroom and other parts of the building. In 1985, the artists were evicted and the building closed. The 1987 Whittier Narrows earthquake caused the collapse of the building immediately to the north of the Carver, and caused a large section of bricks on the top of the north wall to fall to the ground, destroying part of Waszink's T.E. Lawrence mural. Following the earthquake, the north wall was re-bricked and the building remodeled and earthquake retrofitted, as part of the general redevelopment of Old Pasadena.

Robertson Motors built an auto factory just south of the Green Hotel Annex, which is now occupied by Fishbeck Furnishings.

In 1911, City Hall occupied a building at Union Street and Fair Oaks Avenue. Since then, City Hall has moved several times, and the building was lost, only to be replaced in 2003 by a quasi replica now known as the Container Store. The California National Guard used several buildings in Old Pasadena before they built The Armory on Raymond above Holly. The old brick building on Holly across from the senior center was a National Guard motor depot.

In 1929, Colorado Street (now Colorado Boulevard) was widened on the north side, and many of the elaborate Victorian facades of the buildings were lost to reconstruction and replaced with cheaper and more modern frontages. Colorado Street became 14 feet wider as a result. In 1929, Kansas Street was widened and renamed Green Street. Union and Holly streets were part of a city gateway that were to lead toward City Hall (1933) from the statue and flag at Orange Grove Boulevard and Colorado Boulevard. The whole plan was scaled down, but the streets were put in.

=== Historic District ===
As Downtown Pasadena was going through a time of decline during the 1970s, the city had established a Central District Improvement Plan which to improve the conditions of the area. The plan involved the demolition of old historical buildings in order to make way for more modern buildings. However, there was a preservationist group called Pasadena Heritage that fought to save and redevelop the existing historic structures. Pasadena Heritage was founded in 1977 to save Civic Center buildings that were facing demolition.

The Historic Old Pasadena District was designated in 1980 as a historic district of the Pasadena Charter, defined by its boundaries: to the North, Holly Street from Fair Oaks Avenue to Arroyo Parkway; to the East, Arroyo Parkway south to Green Street, moving half a block west to the old Santa Fe RR right-of-way; continuing south to encompass the Old Train Station and Central Park, then north on Fair Oaks Avenue to De Lacey Street, then west to Pasadena Avenue; on the West by Pasadena Avenue, north to Union Street, back to Fair Oaks Avenue, and north to Holly Street.

It was chartered as a means of revitalizing the oldest part of Pasadena, which, though not abandoned, had fallen derelict and was economically and commercially barren. With this charter, a controlled redevelopment was established, with federal tax incentives to qualifying investors. Under strict guidelines, buildings were stripped of old paint, revealing some of the early brickwork fasciae. All renovations and remodeling were overseen by a city commission, which approved materials, colors and styles, most of which were to reflect the period from 1925 to 1940.

The Old Pasadena Historic District was listed in the National Register of Historic Places in 1983.

== Old Pasadena today ==
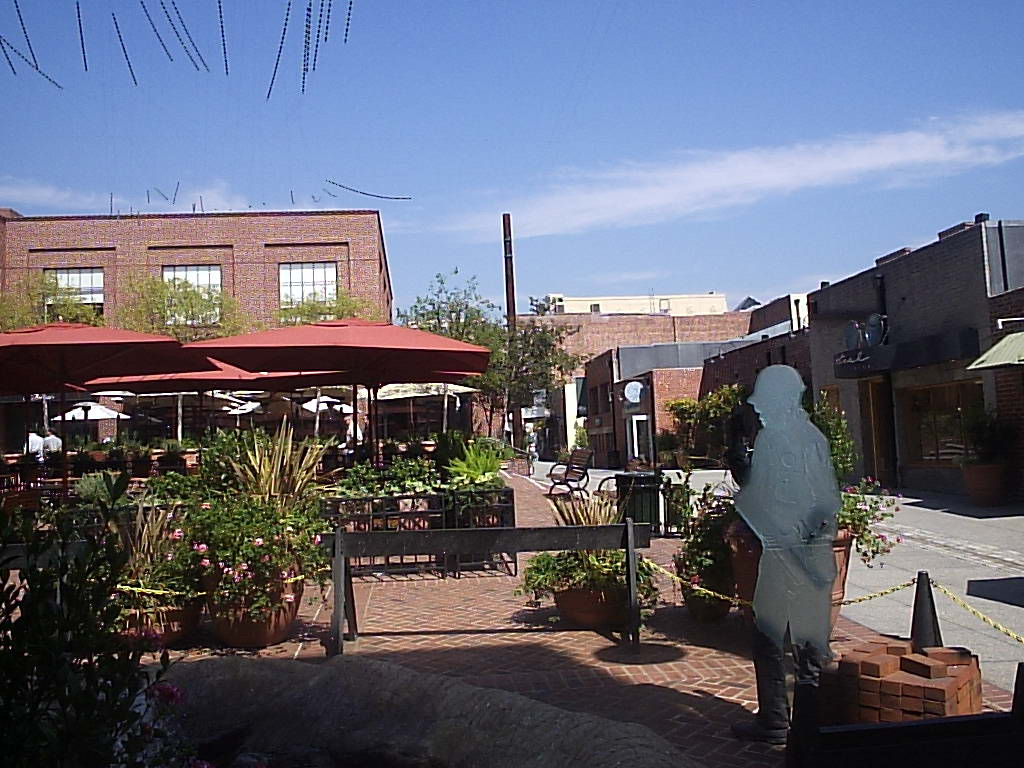
One Colorado Market Place, one of the largest development projects in Old Pasadena.

As business started to move out of Downtown Pasadena in the 1950s, the area started to go through a period of decline. This area began to be known as Skid Row as buildings were left abandoned. Pasadena's downtown declined between 1930 and 1980, but has since been revived as “Old Pasadena”, one of Southern California's most popular shopping and entertainment destinations.

Redevelopment of the downtown area started as there was an infusion of about more than $400 million in public and private money. With the infusion in money, it allowed for private property developments, street improvements, and construction of new buildings such as more parking garages and a retail shopping center. However, not all of this money was focused on new buildings as existing structures were rehabilitated. The existing buildings were redeveloped in order to recreate old Downtown Pasadena. As the redevelopment plans were completed, Downtown Pasadena went through a period of continuous growth. According to Shigley, Pasadena became a model of smart growth for California. This was because of the mixed-use buildings with housing units, retail shops, and professional services which allowed for the growth of Downtown Pasadena commercially and residentially.

Old Pasadena today is mostly a business district, with some mixed use. It contains a shopping mall, up-market restaurants, a movie theater, nightclubs, shops, outdoor cafés, pubs and comedy clubs, and has an active nightlife. The Pasadena Playhouse is located in Old Pasadena. Most of the buildings also have offices and apartments on the upper floors.

Old Pasadena is connected to Downtown Los Angeles via the Metro A Line light rail. Del Mar station is two blocks south of Colorado Boulevard, while Memorial Park station enters from Holly Street and Arroyo Parkway. The Norton Simon Museum is located at Orange Grove Boulevard and Colorado Boulevard. Pacific Oaks College Eureka campus is located at Fair Oaks Avenue and Eureka Street, the very north end of Old Pasadena. On New Year's Day, the Tournament of Roses Parade travels through Old Pasadena on Colorado Boulevard. The spectacle draws an average of 1.5 million spectators each year, thousands of whom camp overnight on the route to have a prime view of the parade.

ArtPerformance is an annual outdoor music event featuring free concerts on multiple stages throughout Old Pasadena, in conjunction with PasadenART Weekend, a three-day citywide event.

Three street intersections in Old Pasadena, Colorado/DeLacey, Colorado/Fair Oaks and Colorado/Raymond, use the pedestrian scramble system, as used in Tokyo, Las Vegas Strip in Nevada, and Rodeo Drive in Beverly Hills.

== Transportation ==
=== Mass transit ===
The Metro A Line has two stations Downtown, at Memorial Park and Del Mar stations. Downtown is also served by Metro Local lines 180, 260, 261, 267, 501, 660 and 662 as well as Pasadena Transit lines 10, 20, 33, 40, 51, 52, and 53; and Foothill Transit line 187.

=== Major streets ===
- Arroyo Parkway
- Colorado Boulevard
- Fair Oaks Avenue
- Holly Street
- Orange Grove Boulevard
- Pasadena Avenue

=== Highways ===
- U.S. Highway 66
- Interstate 210
- California State Route 110
- California State Route 134
- California State Route 710

== Notable residents ==
Notable people who have lived or spent time in Old Pasadena include General George Patton, Alexander Calder, Upton Sinclair, L. Ron Hubbard, Jack Parsons, Albert Einstein, Bobby Fischer and David Lee Roth.

== Sources ==
- Hiram Reid, History of Pasadena, out of print, rare book, 1895.
- Pasadena City Hall, Hall of Records and Office of Cultural History
- Pasadena Museum of History
