= Colorado Boulevard =

Major east–west street in Los Angeles County, Southern California

- Map of Los Angeles County in southern California with Colorado Boulevard highlighted in red
- Maintained by: LACDPW and local city jurisdictions
- Location: Los Angeles County, California, United States
- West end: I-5 in Los Angeles
- Major junctions: SR 2 in Los Angeles; SR 134 in Los Angeles
- East end: Shamrock Avenue in Monrovia

Colorado Boulevard (or Colorado Street in Glendale and parts of Arcadia) is a major east–west street in Los Angeles County, California, United States. It runs from Griffith Park in Los Angeles east through Glendale, the Eagle Rock section of Los Angeles, Pasadena, and Arcadia, ending in Monrovia. The full route was once various state highways but is now locally maintained in favor of the parallel Ventura Freeway (SR 134) and Foothill Freeway (I-210).

== Route description ==
=== West end ===
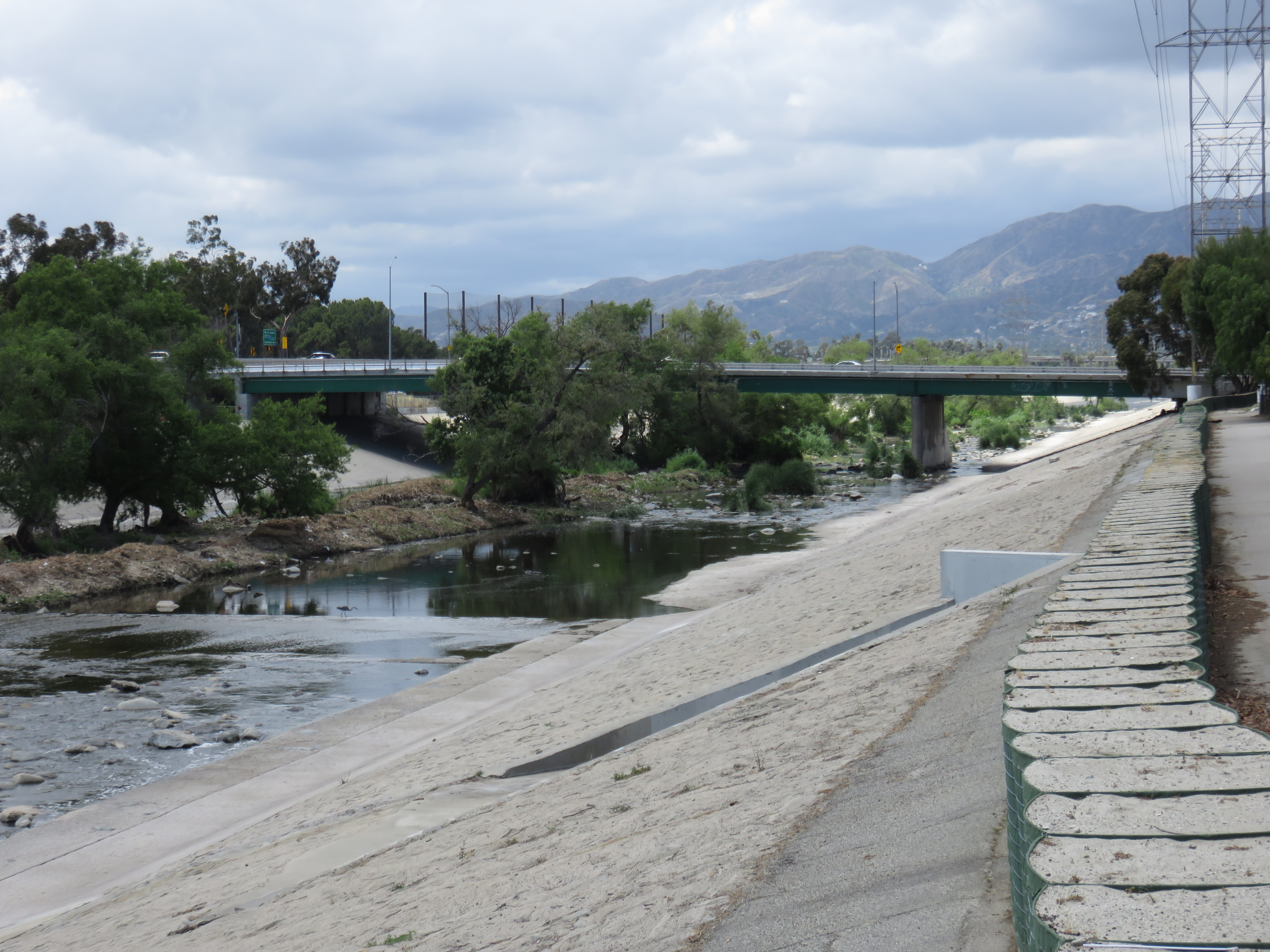
Colorado Street crosses the Los Angeles River in Atwater Village at its western terminus

The west end of Colorado Boulevard is composed of two segments: a disconnected surface street segment of Colorado Boulevard, and the Colorado Street Freeway Extension. Colorado Boulevard begins at a cul-de-sac near the Los Angeles River in Los Angeles and continues east. The road passes on/off-ramps to the eastbound Colorado Street Freeway Extension, and Edenhurst Avenue, which provides access to the westbound freeway. The segment terminates at West San Fernando Road near the Los Angeles-Glendale city limits, and picks up across the railroad corridor at San Fernando Road in the city of Glendale as Colorado Street.

The Colorado Street Freeway Extension begins at Interstate 5 (Golden State Freeway) as a short freeway spur, originally carrying State Route 134 until it was moved north onto the Ventura Freeway, but is still maintained by Caltrans. After crossing the Los Angeles River, the freeway then terminates at Colorado Street in Glendale. The freeway's entrances are signed as entrances to Interstate 5. The Colorado Street Freeway Extension is part of the state highway system as Route 5S.

At the east border of Glendale, Colorado Street becomes Colorado Boulevard as it crosses State Route 2 (Glendale Freeway) into Los Angeles (specifically, the neighborhood of Eagle Rock). Another short freeway spur splits west of the intersection with Figueroa Street, heading northeast to the Ventura Freeway. This spur also carried SR 134 after the Ventura Freeway was built to the east but before it was built west of the split with the spur. After crossing Figueroa Street, Colorado Boulevard splits from Linda Vista Avenue and then passes over the Arroyo Seco on the Colorado Street Bridge into Pasadena.

=== Through Pasadena ===
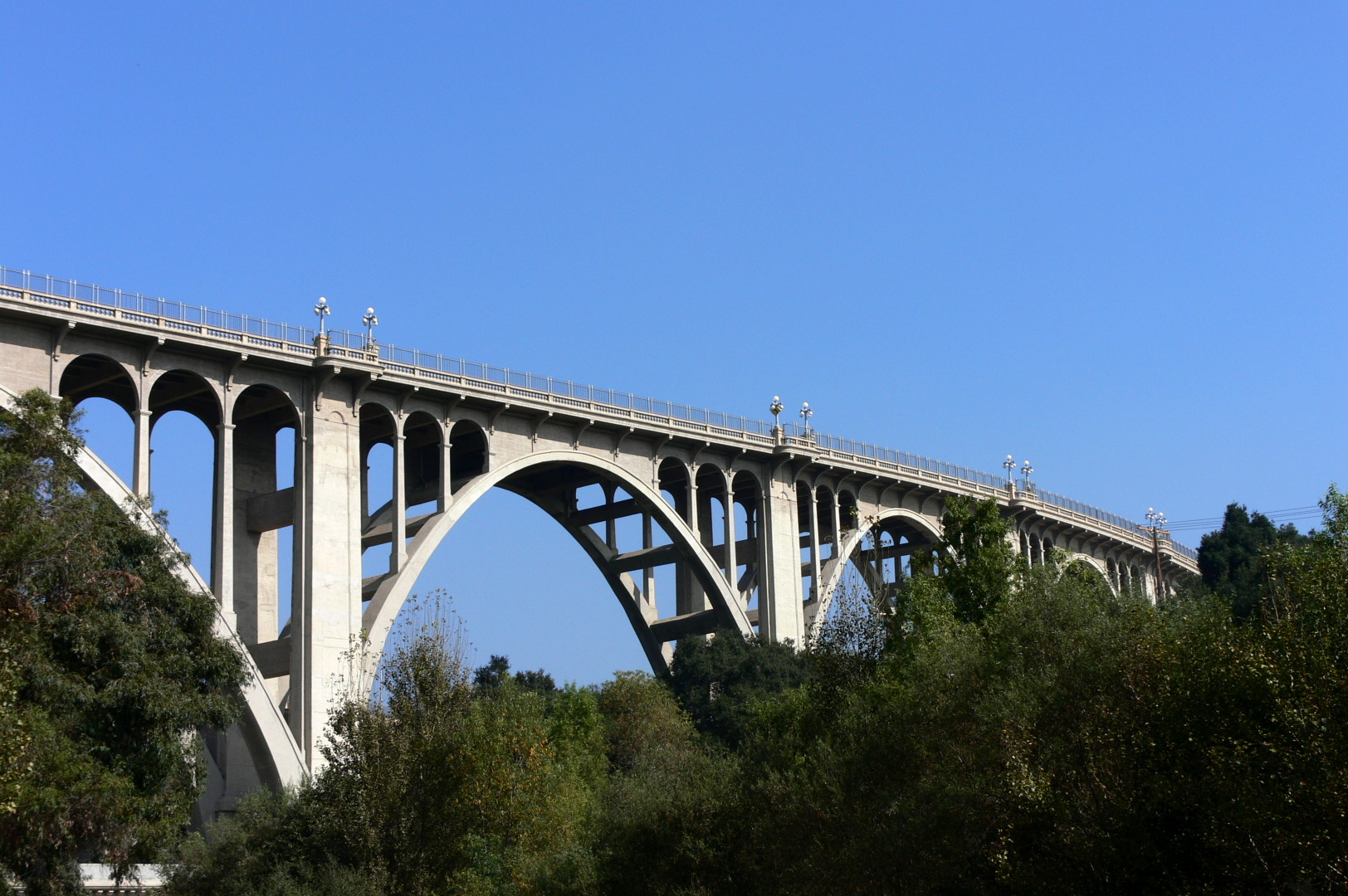
Colorado Street Bridge seen from the Arroyo Seco below

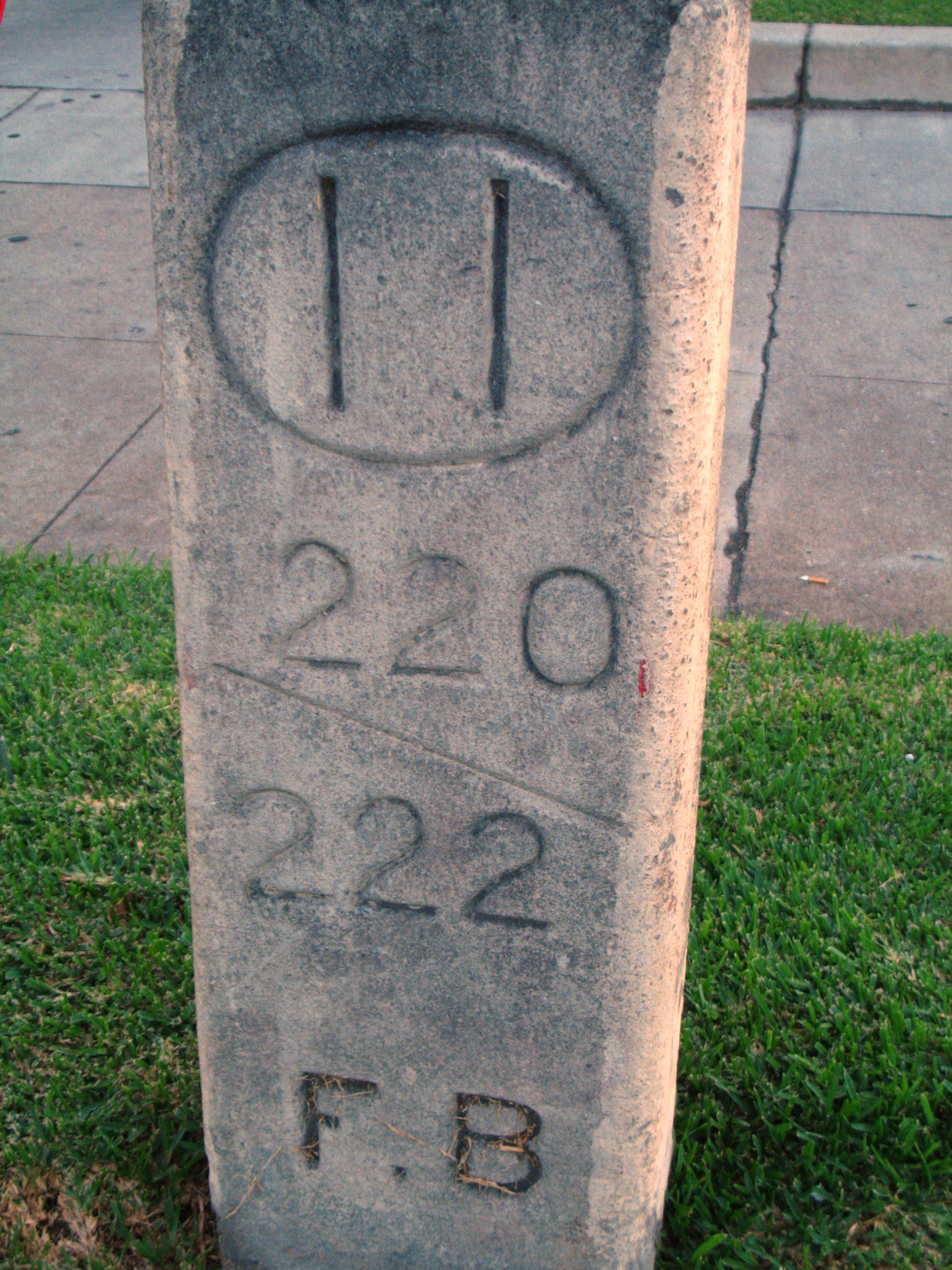
Foothill Boulevard Milestone west of the Holliston Street junction

In Pasadena, Colorado Boulevard crosses the short State Route 710 spur and forms the north end of State Route 110 (Arroyo Parkway). Colorado Street, renamed "Boulevard" in 1958, runs through Old Town Pasadena from Arroyo Parkway to Orange Grove Boulevard. It is the north–south zero axis of the street grid in Pasadena (the east–west axis is Fair Oaks Avenue). The Tournament of Roses parade route travels north on Orange Grove Avenue then east along Colorado Boulevard as far as Sierra Madre Boulevard, where it heads north to Victory Park. Most major Pasadena attractions are found along or within one block of Colorado Boulevard. Pasadena City College is located at 1570 East Colorado Boulevard. The street was mentioned in Jan and Dean's 1964 hit song The Little Old Lady from Pasadena. The road leaves the city into unincorporated East Pasadena, where it intersects Rosemead Boulevard (Former State Route 19), all while formerly signed as California State Route 248.

=== Through Arcadia and Monrovia ===
Colorado Boulevard becomes Colorado Street as it crosses Michillinda Avenue from East Pasadena into Arcadia. Through Arcadia, the street parallels the Foothill Freeway, providing access to many of the neighborhoods in west Arcadia; freeway access is provided via a separated interchange with Baldwin Avenue. Colorado Street then turns southeast and splits into two streets—Colorado Boulevard, which continues east, and Colorado Place, a short segment of old US 66 that goes southeast to merge with Huntington Drive near the Santa Anita Racetrack.

From the split, Colorado Boulevard (originally named Orange Street) becomes a primarily residential street, with some commercial zones near Santa Anita Avenue in Arcadia. The street passes under the Foothill Freeway between First and Second Streets in Arcadia with no access, in front of Monrovia High School, and through Old Town Monrovia before ending at Shamrock Avenue at Recreation Park in Monrovia. (This segment of Shamrock Avenue was once part of an early alignment of US 66 and had been named Foothill Boulevard.)

The Santa Anita Depot, built in 1890 to serve Lucky Baldwin, and the people of Rancho Santa Anita, was located at Colorado Boulevard and Old Ranch Road. It was moved to the Los Angeles County Arboretum and Botanic Garden during the construction of the 210 Foothill Freeway in 1970.

== History ==
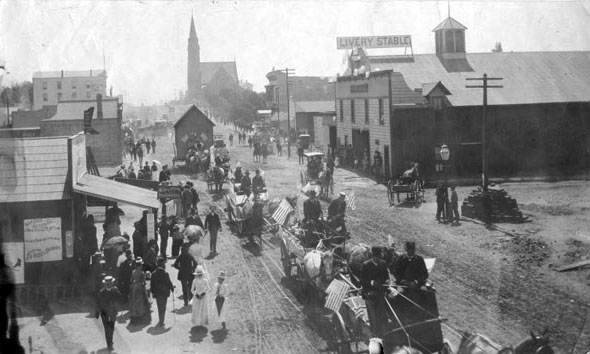
Colorado Boulevard in 1890, then named Colorado Street. Looking east to Marengo Avenue. Horse-drawn wagons displaying America flags, maybe a 4th of July parade.

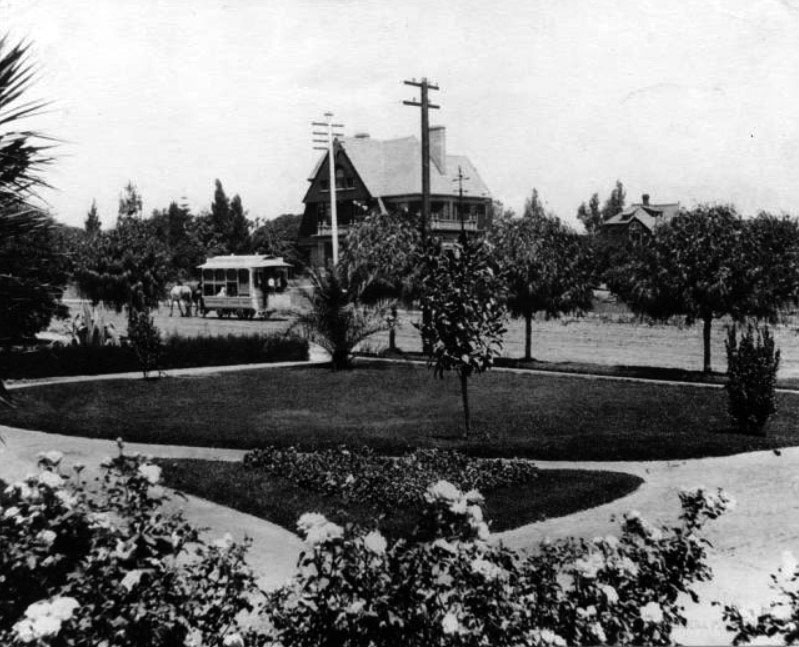
1890 Horse-drawn streetcar on Colorado Street and Oakland in Pasadena

The most original portion of Colorado Boulevard ran from Orange Grove Boulevard to Broadway, now Arroyo Parkway. This portion of the street always contained many shops, banks, hotels, and major commercial industries. By the late 19th century, this part of Colorado had become so popular, it was becoming a traffic bottleneck, and as early as May 1900 there were public outcries to the City Council to widen the road. It wasn't until 1929 that the City undertook the major and unprecedented task of cutting back the buildings along Colorado 14 feet (4.3 m) on each side. This undertaking created a monumental amount of legal red tape as well as many engineering dilemmas which were handled with amazing results. At the same time many of the Victorian facings on the buildings were replaced with Spanish and Art Deco designs.

The Colorado Street Railway began operations in Pasadena on November 9, 1886, bringing mass transit to the street in Pasadena via the new horsecar service. The line was electrified in 1894 and was eventually absorbed into the Pacific Electric system. The Lamanda Park Line and other local services operated in the center of the roadway until January 19, 1941. Several other street railways which operated on Colorado Boulevard. The Los Angeles Railway Eagle Rock Line ran from Eagle Rock Boulevard to Townsend Street until 1955. The Glendale and Montrose Railway also, between 1909 and 1930, ran a streetcar on Colorado west of Eagle Rock Boulevard until their line split at Broadway.

Colorado Street and Colorado Boulevard carried pre-1964 Legislative Route 161 from its west end to the merge with Huntington Drive (via Colorado Place). This was signed as State Route 134 west of Figueroa Street, U.S. Route 66 Alternate (US 66 before the end of 1940) from Figueroa Street to Arroyo Parkway, and U.S. Route 66 from Arroyo Parkway to Huntington Drive.

In 1954, the Colorado Freeway was opened between Holly Street in Pasadena and Eagle Vista Drive and Colorado Boulevard in Eagle Rock to help alleviate traffic congestion due to the narrow Colorado Street Bridge over the Arroyo Seco. The new freeway connected the two communities until 1971, when the entire freeway was closed and upgraded, as well as partially rerouted as the new Ventura Freeway. A short segment of the original Colorado Freeway remains as an on-ramp/off-ramp between Colorado Boulevard in Eagle Rock and the Figueroa Street off-ramp of the present Ventura Freeway.

In the 1964 renumbering, LR 161 remained State Route 134 west of Pasadena, though this was being moved to the new alignment (now the Ventura Freeway); until the freeway was completed through Pasadena in the mid-1970s, Colorado Boulevard was still signed as State Route 134 between Orange Grove Avenue and Arroyo Parkway. Through and east of Pasadena, LR 161 became State Route 248, but was signed as US 66 and continued east on Huntington Drive to the interchange with Interstate 210 (Foothill Freeway) in Monrovia. In 1965, this was to be deleted when I-210 was completed.

The US 66 shields began to come down along the length of Route 248 in 1975, soon after Interstate 210 was completed through Pasadena. SR 248 was never signed as such, though it did appear on some maps in the 1970s and 1980s. The segment within the city of Pasadena was deleted from the state highway system in 1986. The rest was removed in 1992. Along with the moving of SR 134 to the Ventura Freeway, this resulted in Colorado Street and Colorado Boulevard becoming a local road.

== Transit ==
=== Buses ===
- Foothill Transit: line 187 serves Colorado Boulevard in Pasadena.
- Metro Local: line 180 serves Colorado Boulevard in Pasadena.
- Pasadena Transit: route 10 serves Colorado Boulevard in Pasadena.
- LADOT DASH: the Eagle Rock/Highland Park route serves Colorado Boulevard in Eagle Rock.
- Glendale Beeline: line 6 serves Colorado Street in Glendale.

Metro has identified Colorado Boulevard as a potential bus rapid transit corridor, part of a line between North Hollywood station and Pasadena approved in 2016's Measure M. The bus rapid transit project would need to include removable components to allow for the annual staging of the Rose Parade. Some local residents fear increased traffic congestion due to the proposed bus rapid transit route, while others support increasing access to high-quality transit.

== Major intersections ==
Location	mi	km	Destinations	Notes
Glendale	0.0	0.0	San Fernando Road	Western terminus
Glendale	0.1	0.16	Colorado Boulevard Freeway Extension west to I-5	East end of Colorado Boulevard Freeway Extension
Los Angeles	2.4	3.9	SR 2 south (Glendale Freeway) – Los Angeles	No access to SR 2 north
Los Angeles	4.5	7.2	SR 134 east (Ventura Freeway)	Eastbound exit and westbound entrance; access to SR 134 west via Figueroa Street
Los Angeles	4.8	7.7	Figueroa Street	
Pasadena	6.2	10.0	Colorado Street Bridge	
Pasadena	6.4	10.3	SR 134 west (Ventura Freeway) – Ventura	Westbound exit and eastbound entrance; access to SR 134 east via Orange Grove Boulevard
Pasadena	6.5	10.5	Orange Grove Boulevard	
Pasadena	6.8	10.9	St. John Avenue south, Pasadena Avenue north	One-way pair flanking the unsigned SR 710 spur; St. John Avenue south connects Del Mar Boulevard (where SR 710 spur south ends); Pasadena Avenue connects to I-210 (where SR 710 spur north ends)
Pasadena	7.1	11.4	Fair Oaks Avenue	
Pasadena	7.3	11.7	Arroyo Parkway to SR 110 (Arroyo Seco Parkway)	
East Pasadena	11.5– 11.7	18.5– 18.8	Rosemead Boulevard; I-210 (Foothill Freeway)	Access to I-210 west via Rosemead Boulevard to Foothill Boulevard; Rosemead Boulevard is former SR 19
Arcadia	12.9	20.8	Baldwin Avenue	Interchange; connects to I-210
Arcadia	13.4	21.6	Colorado Place (Historic US 66)	
Monrovia	16.4	26.4	Shamrock Avenue	Eastern terminus
1.000 mi = 1.609 km; 1.000 km = 0.621 mi: Incomplete access

=== Colorado Street Freeway Extension ===
All exits are unnumbered.

Location	mi	km	Destinations	Notes
Los Angeles	0.000	0.000	I-5 (Golden State Freeway) – Los Angeles, Sacramento	Western terminus; I-5 exit 142
Los Angeles	0.051	0.082	Colorado Boulevard	Eastbound exit and eastbound entrance
Los Angeles	0.350	0.563	Edenhurst Avenue	Westbound exit and westbound entrance
Glendale	0.550	0.885	San Fernando Road	Eastbound exit only; connects to Elk Avenue
Glendale	0.586	0.943	Colorado Street	Eastern terminus; no left turn to Colorado Street west
1.000 mi = 1.609 km; 1.000 km = 0.621 mi: Incomplete access

=== Western non-contiguous segment ===
The entire route is in Los Angeles.

mi	km	Destinations	Notes
0.0	0.0	Cul-de-sac at 4699 Colorado Boulevard	Western terminus
0.03	0.048	Colorado Boulevard Freeway Extension east	Eastbound exit and eastbound entrance
0.1	0.16	Edenhurst Avenue	
0.3	0.48	West San Fernando Road	Western terminus
1.000 mi = 1.609 km; 1.000 km = 0.621 mi: Incomplete access

== See also ==
- List of streets in the San Gabriel Valley
