= Barlow =

Barlow may refer to:

== Places ==
=== Canada ===
- Barlow River (Chibougamau River), Quebec
- Barlow, Yukon, a local community of Yukon

=== New Zealand ===
- Barlow River (New Zealand), a river in New Zealand
- North Barlow River, a river in New Zealand

=== United Kingdom ===
- Barlow Common, a village in Derbyshire, England
- Barlow, Derbyshire, England
- Barlow, North Yorkshire, England
- Barlow Woodseats Hall, Derbyshire, England

=== United States ===
- Barlow, Alabama, an unincorporated community in Washington County, Alabama
- Barlow, Kentucky
- Barlow, Missouri
- Barlow, North Dakota
- Barlow, Ohio
- Barlow, Oregon
- Barlow Township, Ohio
- Barlow Pass (disambiguation), one of several mountain passes in the United States

=== Mauritius ===
- Barlow, Belle vue Maurel

== Buildings ==
- Barlow Hall, an historic building in Manchester, England
- Barlow Planetarium, a part of the University of Wisconsin-Fox Valley
- Barlow Respiratory Hospital, a specialized hospital in Los Angeles, California (US)
- Barlow Woodseats Hall, an historic building in Barlow, England
- William Barlow House, a historic house in Oregon (US)

== Business ==
- Barlow Lyde & Gilbert, an international law firm
- Hill and Barlow, a Massachusetts (US) law firm (now dissolved)
- Barloworld Limited, a South African industrial brand management company

== Education ==
- The Barlow RC High School, a comprehensive secondary school in south Manchester, England
- Joel Barlow High School, a secondary school in Connecticut (US)
- Sam Barlow High School, a secondary school in Oregon (US)

== People ==
- Barlow (musician), a Canadian singer-songwriter
- Barlow (surname)

== Science and technology ==
- Barlow's disease (disambiguation), a term for scurvy or for mitral valve prolapse
- Barlow's formula, for calculation of the internal pressure that a pipe can withstand
- Barlow knife, a certain pattern of traditional slipjoint pocket knife
- Barlow's law, an incorrect theory of a wire's electric current-carrying ability
- Barlow lens, a diverging lens used in telescope eyepieces
- Barlow maneuver, a test performed on infants to identify possible hip problems
- Barlow Memorial Medal, a recognition by Canadian mining society
- Barlow rail, an early kind of railway rail
- Barlow surface, a mathematical construct
- Barlow's wheel, an early demonstration of an electric motor
- Wigan-Barlow, a 1922-1923 English automobile

== Other uses ==
- Barlow and Chambers execution, 1986 hanging in Malaysia
- Barlow Endowment, a scholarship for musical study (US)
- Barlow's lark, a bird native to Namibia and South Africa
- Barlow Moor, a wilderness area in England
- Barlow Road, a segment of the US Oregon Trail
- 15466 Barlow, an asteroid
- Barlow at Large, also known as Barlow, a British television programme

== See also ==
- Barlough
- Bartow (disambiguation)
