= Alverno Heights Academy =

Location
- 200 North Michillinda Avenue; Sierra Madre, (Los Angeles County), California 91024; United States; 34°9′57″N 118°4′0″W

Information
- Religious affiliation: Roman Catholic
- Established: 1960
- Head of school: Joanne Harabedian
- Grades: TK-8
- Enrollment: 250 (2022-2023)
- Average class size: 25
- Student to teacher ratio: 12:1
- Campus size: 13 acres (53,000 m^{2})
- Colors: Royal blue and White
- Athletics conference: CYO
- Sports: Cross Country, Volleyball, Basketball, Soccer, Softball, and Track and Field
- Nickname: Jaguars
- Affiliation: Immaculate Heart Community
- Website: alvernoheightsacademy.org

Alverno Heights Academy is an independent progressive Catholic TK-8th grade elementary and middle school located in Sierra Madre, California. It was formerly an all-girls high school.

== History ==
The school building and grounds, were part of Villa del Sol d’Oro, owned and built by Dr. Walter Jarvis Barlow and his wife Marion Brooks Barlow in 1924. Dr. Walter had architect Wallace Neff build the Italian Villa, completed in 1928. The Villa is a two-thirds scale replica of the 1534 Villa Collazzi near Florence, Italy.

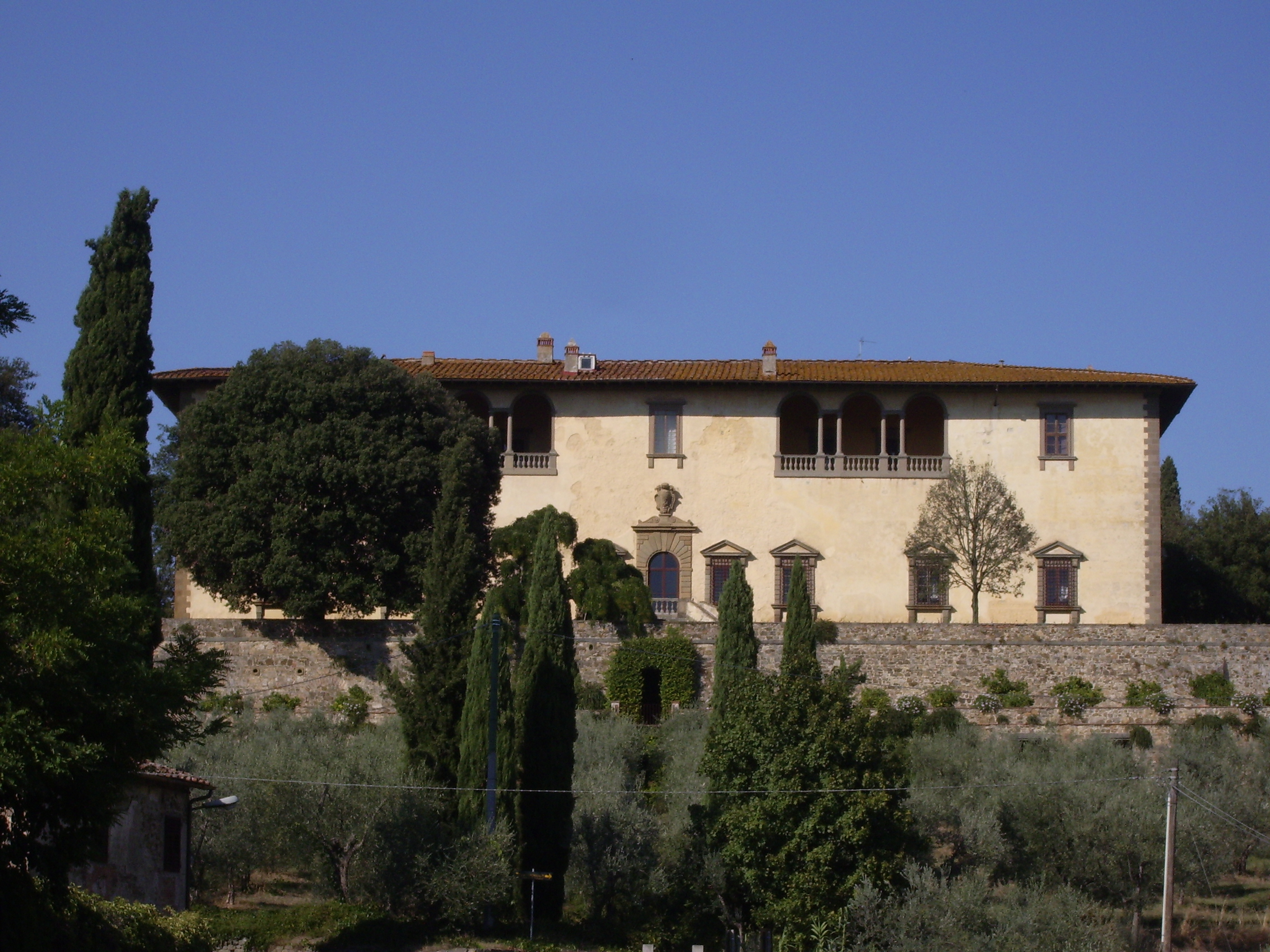
1534 Villa Collazzi near Florence, Italy, inspiration for Villa del Sol d’Oro

The couple raise three children at the villa. Dr. Barlow was from New York and opened a tuberculosis sanatorium in Echo Park, Los Angeles in 1902, this later became the Barlow Respiratory Hospital. Dr. Barlow died in 1937 of tuberculosis. Five years after Walter died in 1942, Marion sold Villa del Sol d’Oro and its 13-acres to the Sisters of St. Francis, followers of St. Francis of Assisi. The Sisters hoped to use the Villa, now called "Provincial Center," as a convent, from which to provide education, childcare, and health care to Catholic immigrants in and around Sierra Madre. The Sisters, seeing a need for education for young women, started an all-girls high school originally called "Alverno Heights Academy," with classes beginning in 1960. The school added athletics and community service and other activities over the years. In 1978, the Sisters of St. Francis formally turned the school and property over to another religious order, the Board of the Immaculate Heart Community, the current legal sponsors of Alverno.

In 1982–83, the exterior shots for the NBC TV mini series "V" made use of the school and Villa for the Alien headquarters.

In the Summer of 2016 Lady Bird (film) was filmed at Alverno Heights Academy as a stand in for the Sacramento all girls Catholic high school St. Francis High School (Sacramento, California).

In 2016 Alverno High School changed its name back to its original name Alverno Heights Academy.

Citing a 50% decrease in enrollment over the prior decade, the school closed its "Upper School" (high school) on June 2, 2023. The coed K-8 "Lower School" remained open.

== See also ==
- Episcopal Church of the Ascension (Sierra Madre, California)
- Old North Church (Sierra Madre, California)
- Sierra Madre Memorial Park
- Sierra Madre Pioneer Cemetery
