= Barstow =

Barstow may refer to:

== People ==
- Barstow (surname)

== Places ==
In the United States

- Barstow, California
- Barstow, Illinois
- Barstow, Maryland
- Barstow, Texas

Elsewhere

- Bartstow, Alberta, a locality in Canada

== Other uses ==
- The Barstow School, a private school in Kansas City, Missouri
- "Barstow", a musical work by Harry Partch

== See also ==
- Bartow (disambiguation)
