= Unknown Scout =

British scout

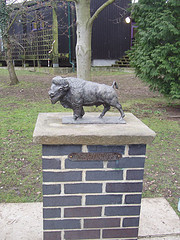
- Silver Buffalo presented as a monument to the Unknown Scout
- Totem: a single "good turn" that inspired W. D. Boyce to bring scouting to America.

The 'Unknown Scout' was an anonymous member of The Boy Scout Association in the United Kingdom whose good turn inspired William D. Boyce to form the Boy Scouts of America (BSA).

== Legend ==
William Boyce was lost on a foggy street in London in 1909 when an unknown Scout came to his aid, guiding him to his destination. Boyce offered a tip, but the boy refused, explaining that he was a Boy Scout and was merely doing his daily good turn. Soon thereafter, Boyce met with General Baden-Powell, the founder of the Scouting movement, who was Chief Scout at the time. Boyce returned to America, and, four months later, founded the Boy Scouts of America on February 8, 1910.

== Facts behind the legend ==
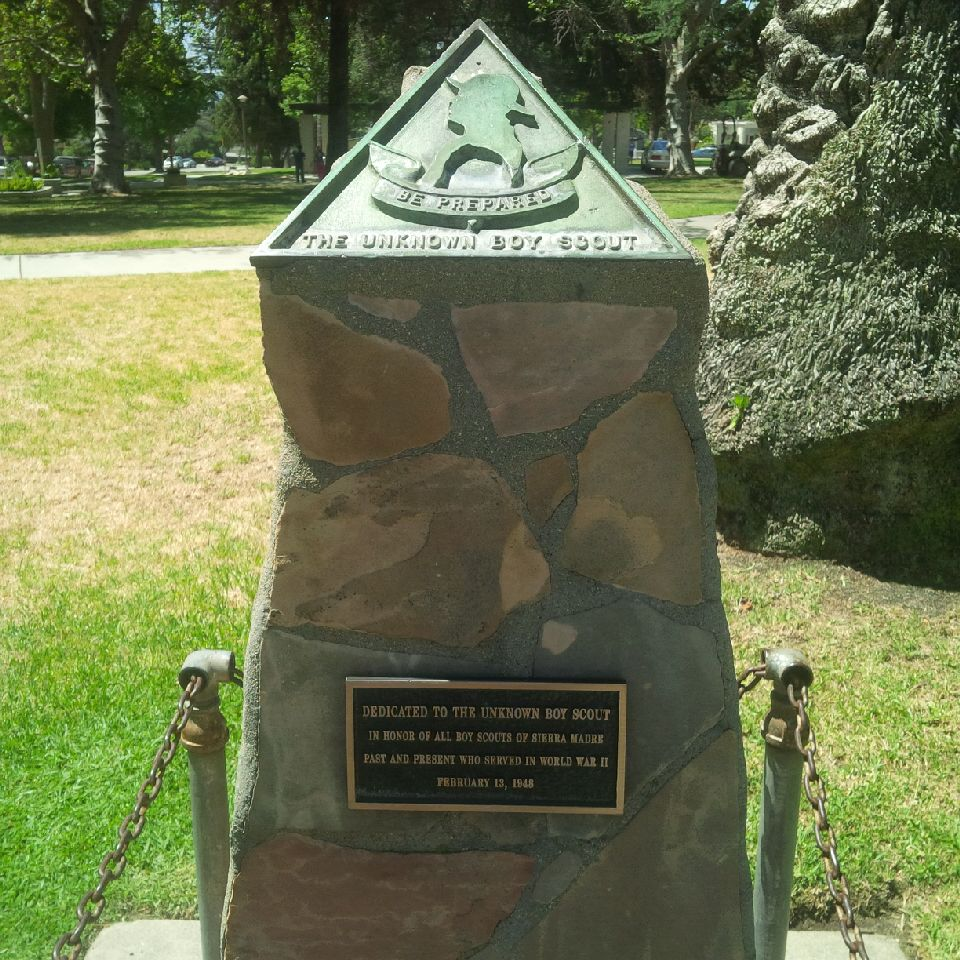
Monument to the Unknown Scout in Sierra Madre, California

The story of the Unknown Scout has been described as "true, at least in essence." Some details, however, have been added to the known facts. According to Edward Rowan, Boyce stopped in London en route to a safari in British East Africa. While an unknown Scout helped him and refused a tip, this Scout only helped him cross a street to a hotel, did not take him to the Scout headquarters, and Boyce never met Baden-Powell. Upon Boyce's request, the Scout did give him the address of the Scout headquarters where Boyce later went on his own and picked up information about the group. Boyce returned to London after his safari and visited the Scout headquarters again and gained the use of Scouting For Boys in the development of a U.S. Scouting program.

While Boyce's original account does not mention there being fog that fateful day, in a 1928 account he did say there was fog. However, climatologists report no fog that day in London. In 1911 a man from Providence, Rhode Island was lost in a fog and helped by a Scout who refused a tip. This man was so impressed that he remembered Scouting in his will. West later stated he recognized the value of adding fog to the legend and by 1923 the "fog" was firmly established as part of the legend.

James E. West, the first professional Chief Scout Executive of the BSA, contended with competing factions amongst the founders of the BSA, primarily Daniel Carter Beard and Ernest Thompson Seton, who pushed their pioneer heritage and American Indian themes respectively and personally ran their organizations. In contrast, West opted to use a modified form of the British program and push the story of Boyce and the unknown Scout.

== Silver Buffalo Award ==
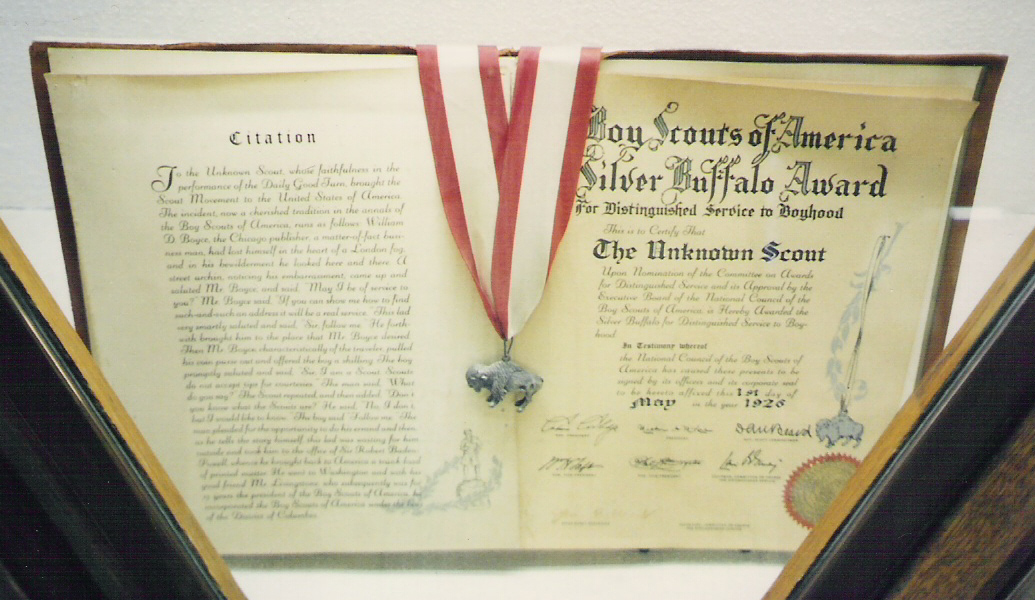
Silver Buffalo award and citation presented to the Unknown Scout

In 1926, the second presentation of the Silver Buffalo Award was to the Unknown Scout. That award resides in the museum at Gilwell Park.

In addition to the award, a statue of a buffalo was presented with a plaque, inscribed:

To the Unknown Scout Whose Faithfulness in the Performance of the Daily Good turn Brought the Scout Movement to the United States of America.

On July 4, 1926, the statue was presented to Edward, Prince of Wales and Baden-Powell by Amory Houghton, the United States Ambassador and a member of the National Council of the BSA. The statue was initially emplaced on a tree stump and later moved to the current brick pedestal located on what is now known as the Buffalo Lawn behind the White House at Gilwell Park.

== See also ==
- Scout Spirit
