= Almarian Decker =

American electrical engineer

Almarian William Decker (born 1852, Ohio; d. Aug. 1893, Sierra Madre, California; interred Sierra Madre Pioneer Cemetery) was an American pioneer of electrical engineering involved in the early development of three-phase electrical power. In 1892 he was hired by H. H. Sinclair and Henry Fisher of the Redlands Electric Light and Power Company, a Californian generating company, to design a new three-phase generator for the Mill Creek No. 1 hydroelectric plant. The plant opened in 1893 and is still in operation today (2026). This was the first commercial application of three-phase electrical power in the United States and probably the world. Its success led to the widespread adoption of three-phase power, in preference to single-phase and direct current.

Decker was also hired by Prof. Thaddeus Lowe of the Mount Lowe Railway which opened in Altadena, California in 1893. Decker was responsible for the daily supervision of the electrical installations on the railway, and had also computed the electrical requirements for the Great Incline operating system, even considering a series of rechargeable batteries since there was such a lack of resources for hydroelectric generation. Decker suffered from tuberculosis which left him so weak that he had to be ferried out to the work sites in a wheelbarrow daily to oversee the electrical installations. He died a little more than a month after the railroad opened.

Many of Decker's theories of electrical methodology were underestimated during his life, and it wasn't until after his death that his theories were put to test and proved applicable.
