= Orange Grove Boulevard (Pasadena) =

Street in California, United States

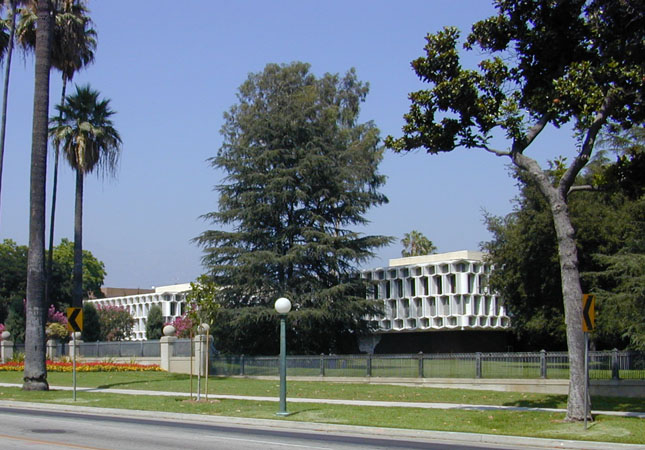
The Ambassador Auditorium is part of Ambassador College's former campus on Orange Grove Boulevard.

Orange Grove Boulevard is a main thoroughfare in Pasadena and South Pasadena, California. Each New Year's Day, the Rose Parade participants and floats line up before dawn on Orange Grove Boulevard, facing north, for the beginning of the parade. The Los Angeles Times said: "When a stranger comes to Pasadena now, the real-estate agent shows him Orange Grove Avenue.

== Background ==
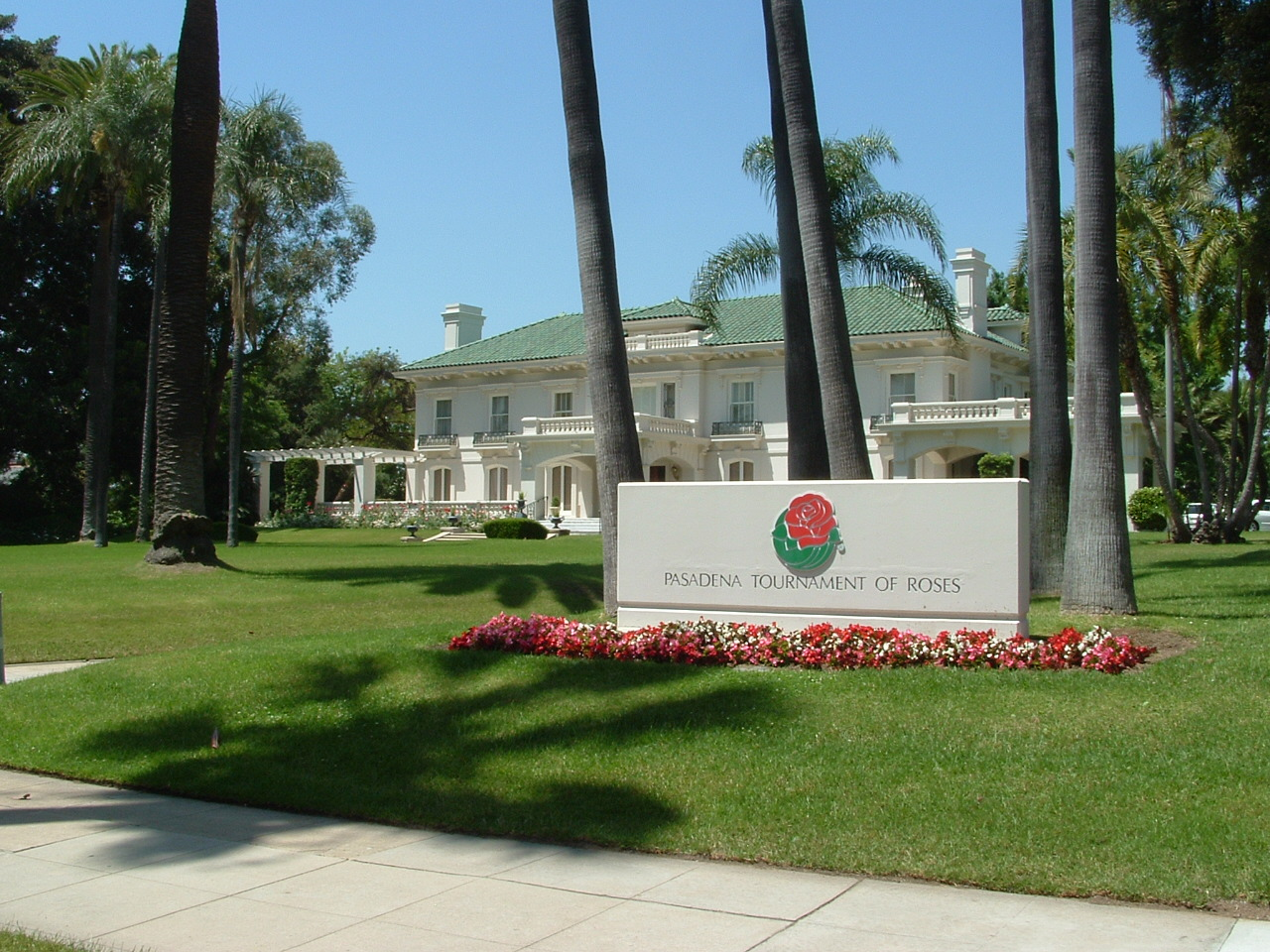
Tournament House

Orange Grove Boulevard exclusive residential districts in Pasadena, and has been called a "Millionaire's Row since the early 20th century. The maker of Wrigley's chewing gum, William Wrigley Jr.'s, home was proffered to the city of Pasadena after Mrs. Wrigley's death in 1958, under the condition that their home would be the Rose Parade's permanent headquarters. The stately Tournament House stands on Orange Grove Blvd. today, and serves as the headquarters for the Tournament of Roses Parade. In wartime 1942, Orange Grove Boulevard was used as an alternate route for the Rose Parade to avoid an enemy attack.

North Orange Grove Boulevard

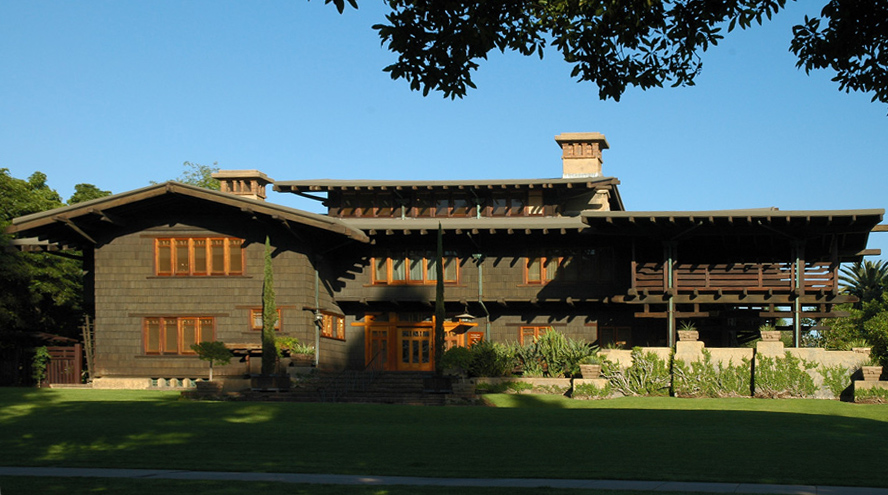
The Gamble House is located on Westmoreland Place, an offshoot of Orange Grove Boulevard.

Formerly referred to as Mountain Avenue, North Orange Grove Boulevard is home to the Gamble House. North of Holly Street, the road bends northeast, ending at North Fair Oaks Avenue. The home of David Gamble, son of consumer product maker James Gamble of Procter & Gamble, is located on the north end of Orange Grove Blvd. The Gamble House, an American Craftsman masterpiece, was built in 1908, by architects Charles and Henry Greene, as an exemplification of their Ultimate bungalow. It is open to the public as both an architectural conservancy and museum. The Gamble House is a California Historical Landmark and a National Historic Landmark on the National Register of Historic Places. In 1966 it was deeded to the city of Pasadena in a mutual agreement with the University of Southern California School of Architecture. Ever since that time, two USC architecture students per year have been selected to live in the house full-time.

East Orange Grove Boulevard

Formerly referred to as Illinois Street, this section of Orange Grove Boulevard runs through the more economically diverse northern part of the city. Although there is a small commercial district between Lincoln and Los Robles avenues, this section of the street is overwhelmingly residential. The street ends at California State Route 19 (North Rosemead Boulevard) and Sierra Madre Villa Avenue in Hastings Ranch. Orange Grove crosses Sierra Madre Boulevard just before ending.

South Orange Grove Boulevard

The Norton Simon Museum is at the intersection of Orange Grove and Colorado boulevards. The museum can be quite clearly seen every year during the Rose Parade broadcast. The parade's official start is at Orange Grove Boulevard and Ellis Street.

South Orange Grove Boulevard becomes South Orange Grove Avenue at Columbia Street and its southern terminus is a cul-de-sac in western South Pasadena, passing by Orange Grove Park. Between Columbia Street and Colorado Boulevard, the road is the center of an exclusive neighborhood. In 1876, unimproved land with water could be purchased for about $100 an acre. Currently, a small empty lot is likely to go for as much as $200,000. Most of the mansions in this area are gone; multiple residential courts and condominiums line the street. Valley Hunt Club, Maranatha High School, and Westridge School are located on South Orange Grove Boulevard.

== See also ==
- List of streets in the San Gabriel Valley
