= Alan Wood (military officer) =

American naval officer and painter

Alan Stevenson Wood (May 3, 1922 – April 18, 2013) was an American retired naval officer and veteran of World War II. Wood, who was U.S. Naval Communications officer at the Battle of Iwo Jima in February 1945, supplied the American flag being raised in the historic Raising the Flag on Iwo Jima photograph taken by Joe Rosenthal on February 23, 1945.

== Biography ==
=== Early life ===
Wood was born in Pasadena, California, on May 3, 1922. He was a descendant of one of the first pioneer families who had settled area which is now modern-day Sierra Madre, California. Wood received a bachelor's degree in history from the University of California, Berkeley.

=== World War II and Iwo Jima ===
Alan Wood had discovered a 37-square-foot American flag at a naval depot in Pearl Harbor, Hawaii, months before deploying to the western Pacific Theater. He took the flag with him when he left Hawaii.

Wood was a twenty-two-year-old naval communications officer for a landing ship, the Navy vessel LST-779, at the Battle of Iwo Jima. After five days of fighting, the U.S. Marines had managed to take the summit of Mount Suribachi, the highest point on the island. On February 23, 1945, a United States Marine asked Wood for the largest American flag he could find; Wood gave him the flag he had found in Hawaii. Six Marines would later raise Wood's flag atop Mount Suribachi in an iconic photograph which was taken by Associated Press reporter Joe Rosenthal. The photograph became one of the most iconic images of World War II.

A Marine General asked Wood to provide details on the history of the now iconic American flag following the battle. Wood replied to the General in 1945 letter, "The fact that there were men among us who were able to face a situation like Iwo where human life is so cheap, is something to make humble those of us who were so very fortunate not to be called upon to endure such hell."

Wood's role in supplying the flag was confirmed in April 2013 by retired Marine Colonel Dave Severance, the commander of the company of the U.S. Marines who took Mount Suribachi on Iwo Jima. Severance noted that "I have a file of more than 60 people who claim to have had something to do with the flags," but confirmed that it was indeed Wood who brought the American flag to Iwo Jima.

=== Career ===
Wood enrolled at the Art Center in Pasadena, where he studied water color. He became a respected watercolorist and painter.

He was hired as a technical artist for the Jet Propulsion Laboratory in La Canada Flintridge, California in 1958. He later served as a spokesperson and public relations officer for the Laboratory as well. Wood coordinated press and media coverage for NASA's Mariner, Viking, Voyager and Galileo space exploration missions.

Wood died of natural causes at his home in Sierra Madre, California, on April 18, 2013, at the age of 90. His wife, Elizabeth Wood, died in 1985; they had a son. He was buried at Sierra Madre Pioneer Cemetery.
