= Hastings Ranch, Pasadena, California =

Neighborhood of Pasadena, California

Coordinates: 34.163915°N 118.074424°W

Hastings Ranch is a neighborhood of Pasadena, California, which lies in northeast Pasadena. It is principally accessed by Sierra Madre Boulevard, Michillinda Avenue, Hastings Ranch Drive, and Riviera Drive. Hastings Ranch is also identified by large shopping areas at its southernmost end and by a shopping center at the corner of Sierra Madre and Michillinda. Hastings Ranch is divided by Sierra Madre Blvd, north of the blvd is Upper Hastings Ranch and south is Lower Hastings Ranch. To the north of the Ranch are the San Gabriel Mountains and Mount Wilson.

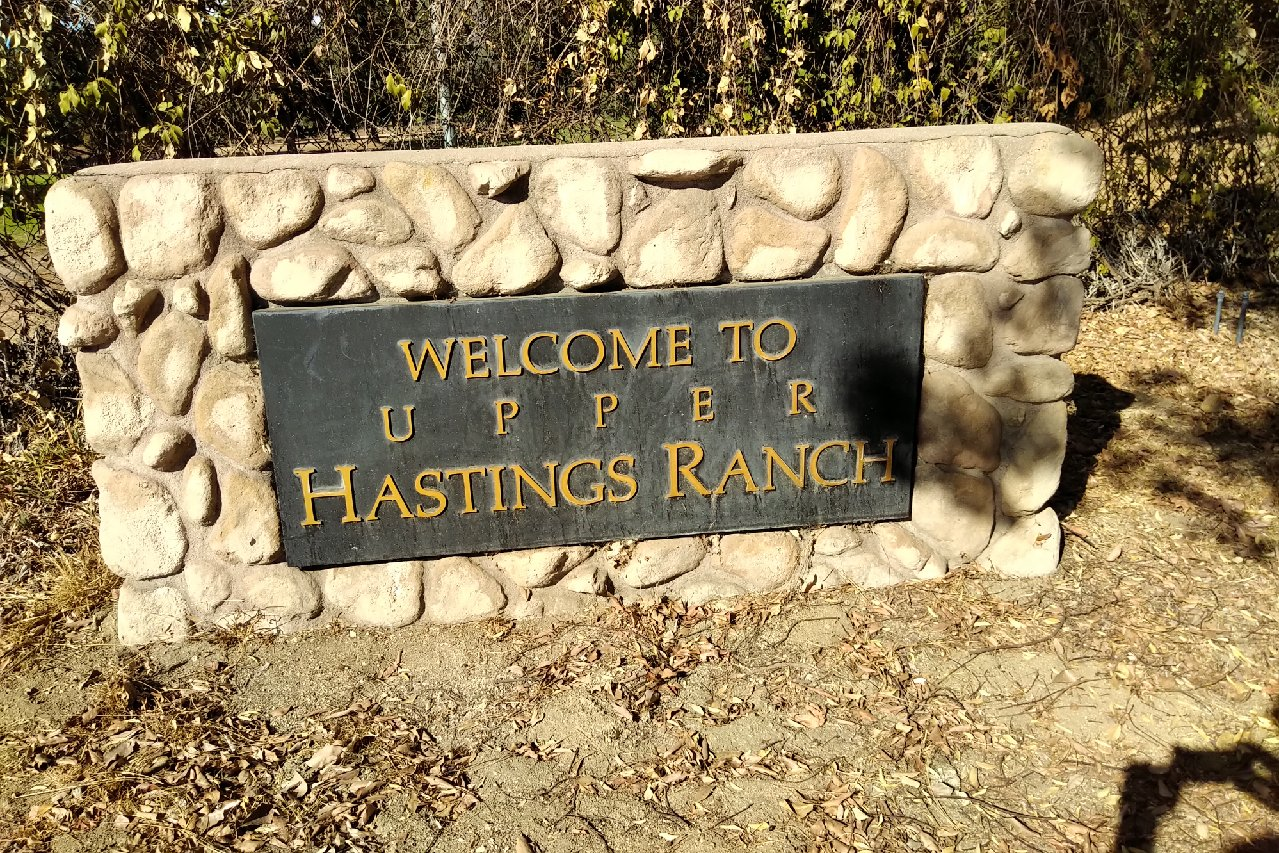
Upper Hastings Ranch welcome sign

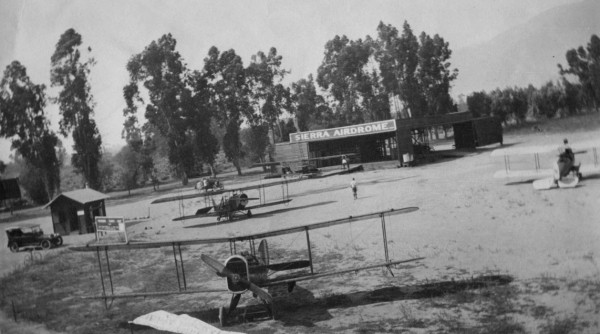
Sierra Airdrome, also called Hastings Airport, 1920

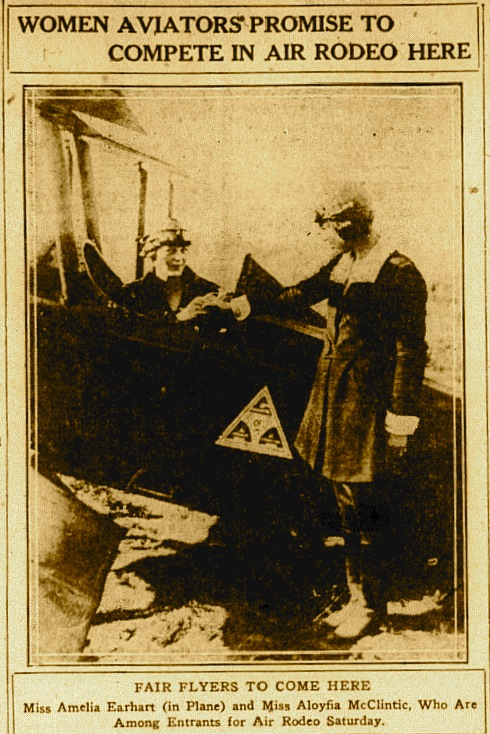
Amelia Earhart (in plane) and Aloysia McCintic in Pasadena Star News December 15, 1921 add for air rodeo at Hastings Airport

== History ==
In 1882, Charles Cook Hastings purchased 1,100 acres (450 ha) of land between Pasadena and Sierra Madre for US$7 per acre. He named his ranch "Mesa Alta Rancho" and began planting 300 acres (120 ha) with grape vines and constructed a mansion. Soon after he died, his son, Charles Houston Hastings, assumed responsibility for the land. He imported unusual specimens of plants and trees and populated the ranch with peacocks, pheasants, cats, dogs (32 collies) and champion horses. In 1928, the Hastings mansion caught fire and burned to the ground. The ranch fell into a state of disrepair and its operation was left to managers.

Hastings Ranch was one of several competing sites for the University of California's southern campus, but lost to UCLA in 1919.

The Sierra Airdrome was an air strip at Sierra Madre Villa Avenue and Foothill Boulevard built in 1920 by the Sierra Aircraft Company of Pasadena. Currently, its location is occupied by a shopping center. The airport was also known as Sierra Flying Field, Eliel Field and Hastings Airport. The Sierra Aircraft Company of Pasadena was owned by Leon T. Eliel, a former Air Force lieutenant and World War I aviator, and Walter Wright Alley, an airplane technician. Along with air and mail travel, there was aerial surveys, as Eliel had patented an aerial photography camera. Small planes were built at the airport also. The airport was triangular shaped, with the side dimensions of 1,800 x 2,000 x 2,700 feet. Amelia Earhart flew from the airport in an air rodeo in 1924. World War I flying ace, Bogart Rogers, also flew from the airport. The Sierra Airdrome closed in 1929.

Following the death of Charles Houston Hastings in 1942, the ranch was sold by the Hastings Foundation to a syndicate for over $1 million. The land was subdivided into luxury housing tracts. Hired by Coronet Construction Co. / Coronet Homes, Inc. in the late 1940s, Edward H. Fickett, FAIA was brought in to design the three subdivided tracts. The construction was completed in three phases, including 600 homes in the Lower Hastings tract completed in 1950, 480 homes in the Middle Hastings tract completed in 1950, along with 800 homes Fickett built in 1951 in the Upper Hastings Ranch area.

Hastings Ranch Shopping Center, located on the north side of Foothill Boulevard between Rosemead Boulevard and Michillinda Avenue, opened in 1960 with an expansion in 1984.

With the post war growth of the 1950s, a drive-in theater was established at the lowest point of the neighborhood between Rosemead and Foothill Boulevards by the name of Hastings Drive-In Theater. It fell to heavy commercial development in the 1960s. The drive-in was replaced by the Hastings Theater, which opened in 1968. The theater was a part of the Pacific Theatres chain, until it closed in 2008. Mann Theatres opened a competing three-screen movie theater in Hastings Ranch in March, 1975 (premiering with The Towering Inferno), which closed in 2002.

Today Hastings Ranch is defined locally as two independent neighborhoods: Upper Hastings and Lower Hastings, with Sierra Madre Boulevard dividing the two.

The Lariat is the bimonthly newsletter published for the residents of Upper Hastings Ranch. The newsletter contains information about the neighborhood, as well as publicizing essays by young residents.

Films made in the Hastings Ranch area include 1978's The Jerk with Steve Martin (the gas station scene was filmed on the southwest corner of Greenhill Avenue and Rosemead Boulevard, now a fast food restaurant). A once-popular BMX track in a vacant lot next to Field Elementary School, frequented by neighborhood children (including the Van Halen brothers), was leveled in 1976 to make room for the Sunrise Campus of First Church of the Nazarene. The complex was completed in 1985.

In 2025, the January 2025 Southern California wildfires, specifically the Eaton Fire, caused significant damage to Upper Hastings Ranch, as well as causing smoke and other types of damage to nearby homes.

== Education ==
Hastings Ranch is home to Don Benito Elementary School and Field Elementary School. The neighborhood is also served by Sierra Madre Middle School and Pasadena High School. La Salle High School is a private school in the area. Nearby in Sierra Madre is Alverno Heights Academy and Bethany Christian School and Preschool.

== Government ==
Hastings Ranch is part of the Pasadena City Council's Fourth District, represented by Gene Masuda.

== Christmas displays ==
Upper Hastings Ranch, run by the Upper Hastings Ranch Association (UHRA), a volunteer, nonprofit HOA, has become one of the most popular areas for neighborhood outdoor Christmas displays. The practice began in 1957 whereby each block in the neighborhood would decorate their homes with some type of theme icon placed in the parkway, e.g., snowmen, Christmas trees, Santas and reindeer, Peanuts cartoon characters, etc. The tour which was taken by automobile would consist of miles of lighting and other entertaining Christmas scenarios displayed about the labyrinth of homes.

== See also ==
- Benjamin Davis Wilson

== Transportation ==
The neighborhood overall is served by Metro Local micro; Pasadena Transit routes 60 with connection to the Metro A Line terminal complex on Sierra Madre Villa Avenue and Foothill Boulevard. The nearby city of Sierra Madre offers transportation on a Gateway bus.

== Notes ==
- Pasadena Heritage Org Running with History - Mile 23: Sierra Madre Line
- USC Digital Library, View of Pacific Electric car 401 at the intersection of Baldwin Avenue and Sierra Madre Boulevard in Sierra Madre, 1908
- Pacific Electric Sierra Madre Line, by the Electric Railway Historic Association of Southern California.
