= Bartow =

Bartow may refer to:

== Places ==
- Bartow, Germany, a municipality in Mecklenburg-Vorpommern
- Places in the United States, all named after Francis S. Bartow:
  - Bartow, Florida, a city and county seat
  - Bartow, Georgia, a town
  - Bartow County, Georgia
  - Bartow, West Virginia, a census-designated place

== People ==
- Bartow (name), a surname and given name

== Other uses ==
- Bartow Arena, Birmingham, Alabama, United States, home to the teams of the University of Alabama at Birmingham
- Bartow Air Base, a former United States Air Force base near Bartow, Florida
- Bartow High School, Bartow, Florida

== See also ==
- Barlow (disambiguation)
- Barstow (disambiguation)
