= Old North Church (Sierra Madre, California) =

Building in California, United States

Old North Church Christ Church Sierra Madre - Sierra Madre Congregational Church
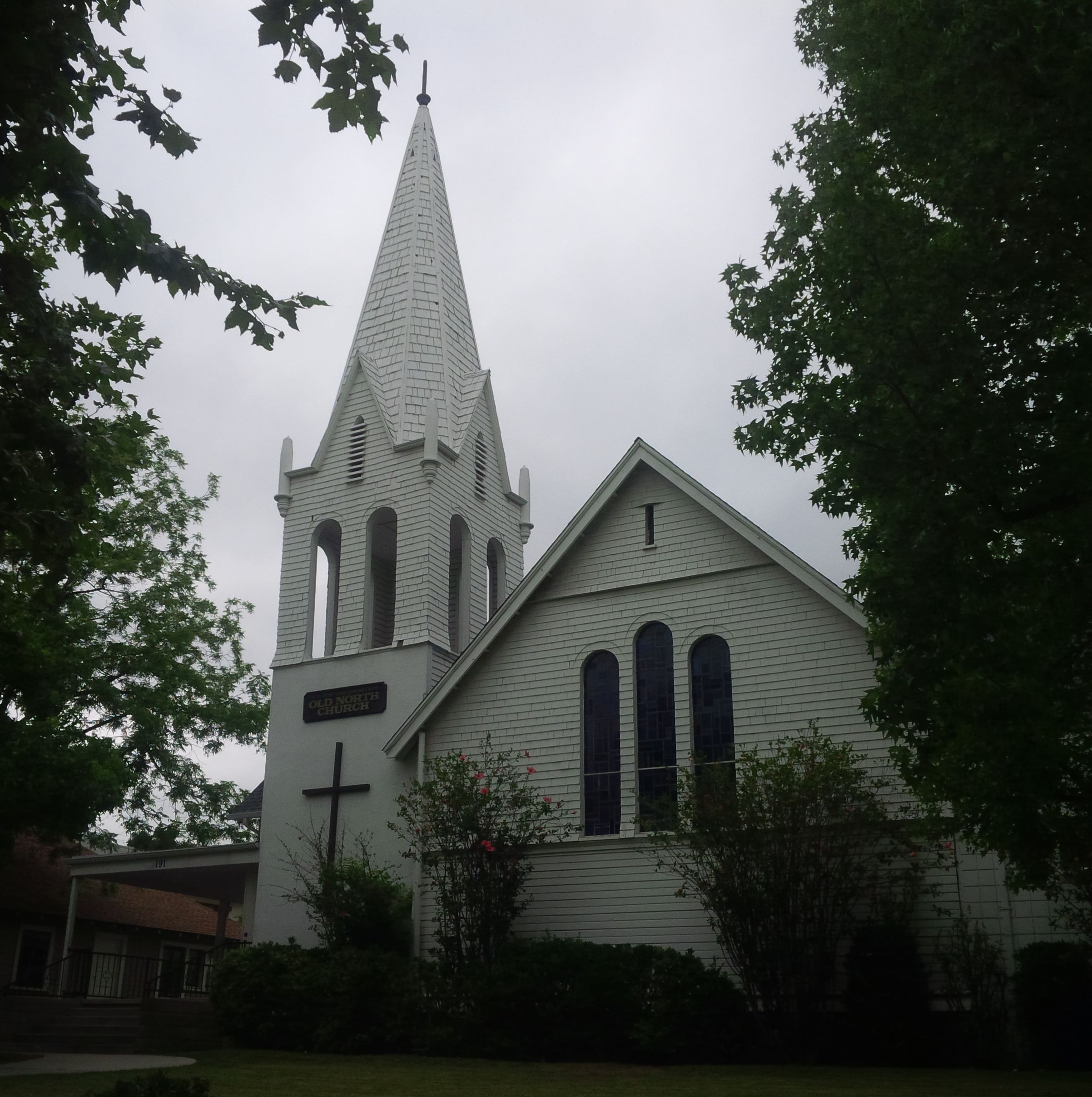
- Old North Church, Sierra Madre, California, a historic landmark.

- Location within the Los Angeles metropolitan area Location within California Location within the United States

General information
- Status: Used for Youth Groups and Indonesia Church: Jemaat Kristen
- Architectural style: Georgian architecture
- Location: Sierra Madre, California, United States
- Coordinates: 34.1622306°N 118.0566944°W
- Elevation: 263 m (863 ft)
- Current tenants: Christ Church Sierra Madre, formerly called Sierra Madre Congregational Church
- Construction started: April 1890
- Completed: Dec. 14, 1890
- Cost: $3,300

Technical details
- Structural system: Wood

Design and construction
- Designations: Sierra Madre Historic Landmark #50

Website
- https://www.christchurchsm.org

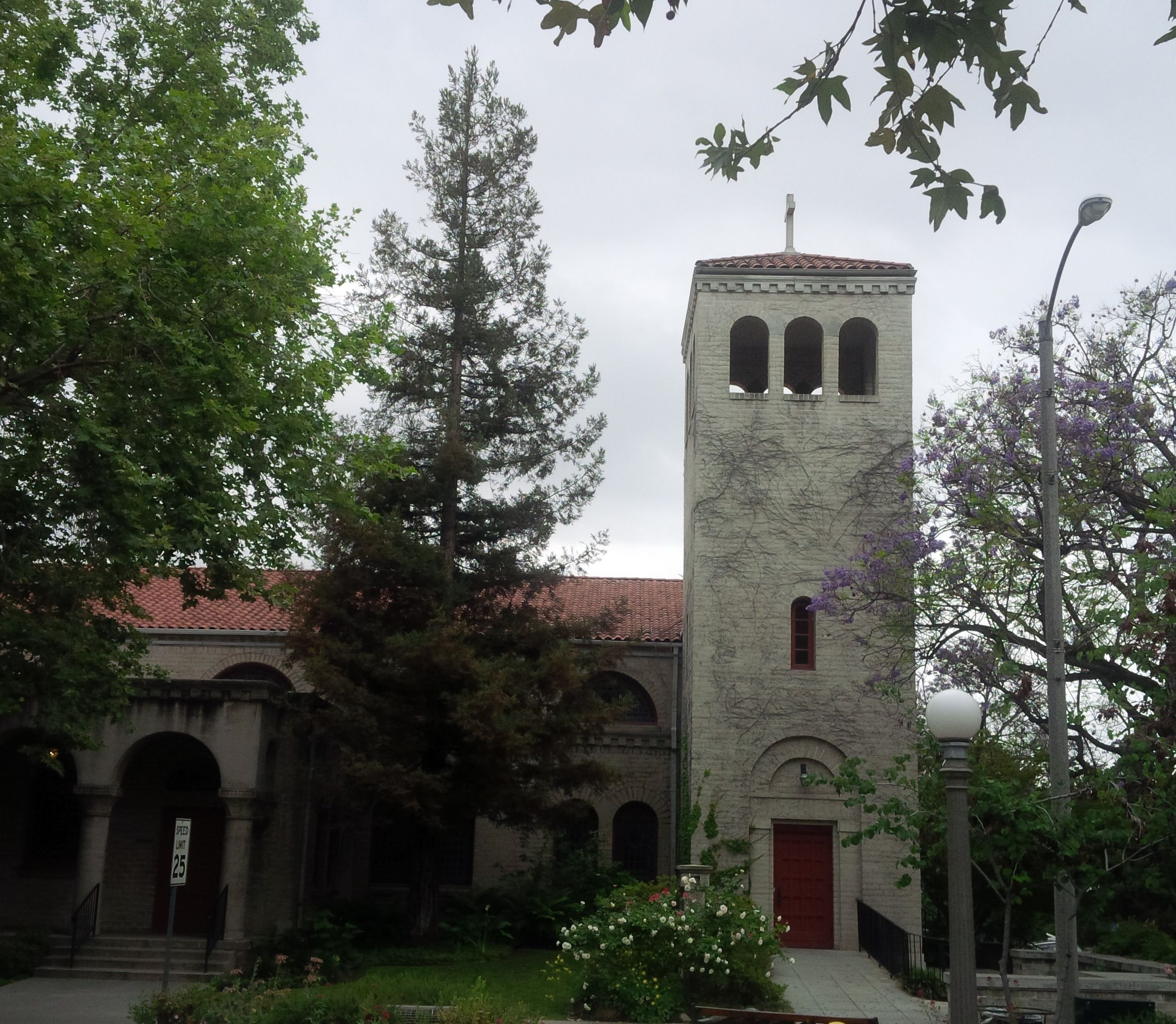
Sierra Madre Congregational Church Sierra Madre Historic Landmark #49 Architect: Marsh, Smith, & Powell Construction started: 1925 Construction completion: 1928 Total Cost: $80,000 *Pritchard Hall and Admin building $40,000 *Sanctuary $35,000 *Furniture $5,000 Architectural style: Romanesque Revival Across the Street from Old North Church

Old North Church (ONC) is in Sierra Madre, California and is a historic landmark building built in 1890, one of the oldest churches and buildings in Sierra Madre. The Old North Church is owned by its builder Christ Church Sierra Madre, called First Congregational Church of Sierra Madre at the time of completion. It is site #50 on Sierra Madre designated historical landmarks list. There are forty-eight properties listed on Sierra Madre's Designated Historical Properties List. In September 2018 Sierra Madre Congregational Church changed its name to Christ Church Sierra Madre.

== History ==
The Old North Church was constructed by hand with local wood. It is located on the north side of the current Sierra Madre Blvd at Hermosa. In 1890 Sierra Madre Blvd was a dirt street called Central Avenue. Old North Church is currently owned by its builder, Christ Church Sierra Madre. The Old North Church is closely linked with the early settlement of Sierra Madre. The community of Sierra Madre was established in the fall of 1881. Sierra Madre Congregational Church started as a Sunday School class in February 1882. Without a building of its own, the church originally met in the city's original 1882 one-room schoolhouse at the corner of Hermosa and Live Oak, now called Orange Grove. To use the schoolhouse as a church on Sunday mornings, the pump organ, hymnbooks, and winter firewood were transported to the schoolhouse by the attendees. The following years the Church met in the original City Hall at the corner Baldwin and Central Ave (Sierra Madre), then the original city library (1889), located at the current library site. With the completion of the Old North Church in 1890, the church had its own meeting spot. The first service was held on August 17, 1890 and a formal dedication was held December 14, 1890. The land for the old North Church was donated by C.E. Cook and W.S. Andrews. Congregational Church of Sierra Madre was officially established on March 27, 1886, as a nondenominational church congregational church, with 13 founding members, called First Congregational Church of Sierra Madre then. One of the 13 founding members was Mrs. Annetta M. Carter (1846-1937), wife of the city founder Nathaniel Coburn Carter (1840-1904). From 1908 to 1910 the Old North Church was expanded with the addition of new meeting rooms, a kitchen and bathrooms. Also in 1910, a furnace was installed to replace the wood-burning stove.

The Church's second, and the current, main building was built across the street. Construction of the new building started in 1926 with Pritchard Hall and was completed in 1928 with the new sanctuary dedicated on June 17, 1928. The sanctuary cornerstone was laid on Feb. 19, 1928. The 1928 Church building is also a Sierra Madre designated historical landmark, as site #39. Having outgrown the Old North Church in the mid-1920s, the Congregational Church of Sierra Madre built a new stone Church in a Romanesque Revival architecture style, designed by Marsh, Smith & Powell. Later after the move, the Old North Church was rented to the First Church of the Nazarene in 1939, then purchased by them in 1942. After the Church of the Nazarene outgrew the Old North Church, it was sold back to Sierra Madre Congregational Church in 1976. Congregational Church purchased back the Old North Church for the use of its youth and children, its current role. Sierra Madre's Cub Scouts Pack 373, Boy Scouts Troop 373, a Scouts BSA troop, meetings are held in the Old North Church. Troop 373 was founded in the Old North Church in 1924. Cub Scouts Pack 373 was started in 1971. Troop 373 was one of the founders of the Sierra Madre Fourth of July parade that then ran from historic Sierra Madre Memorial Park (across the street from the ONC) to historic Sierra Madre Pioneer Cemetery. On February 24, 2024, Troop 373 celebrated is 100 year anniversary.

The Old North Church survived the 1991 Sierra Madre earthquake relatively undamaged. The 1928 building had damage to the bell tower, which was torn down brick by brick and rebuilt. The original ONC bell tower was built with a barn shaped roof, modeled after a Dutch church in Holland. Later the Church of the Nazarene changed the bell tower to have a more classic pointed spire. The bell tower housed the 1893 bell weighing 517 pounds, in 1928 the bell was moved to the new south bell tower.

In 1890 Old North Church attendees had to walk, ride a horse or ride in a horse buggy. In January 1906 the Pacific Electric street car was installed and rolled in front of the Old North Church, on the Sierra Madre Line, each day from January 1, 1906, till service ended on October 6, 1950.

Mrs. Annetta M. Carter, wife of Nathaniel Coburn Carter, was key founder of Sierra Madre Congregational Church. Nathaniel and Annetta married in Feb. of 1864 and had five children. Annetta M. Pierce (Carter) and Nathaniel both were natives of Lowell, Massachusetts, Nathaniel came to California for his health in 1871. In February 1881, Nathaniel Carter purchased the original 1103 acres that comprised the new city of Sierra Madre. The land was acquired in three purchases: 845 acres of Rancho Santa Anita from Lucky Baldwin, 108 acres from the Southern Pacific Railroad Company and 150 acres from John Richardson. With no church in the new small town Annetta Carter helped form the worship group in 1882 that became Sierra Madre Congregational Church. The ONC bell was made and installed in 1893, and has the quote on it "Let him who hears come." The bell was made by Meneely Bell Foundry, Troy, NY. The bell was presented to the Church by Mr. A. S. Bixby, from Bixby Knolls, Long Beach. The bell was used for Sunday services and funerals, but also had a civic duty, to alert the all-volunteer Fire Department.

The original 1904 Pastor's parsonage house was on the north side of Central Avenue (about 127 W. Sierra Madre Boulevard), but as the city grew the house was now on a busy street, so in 1923 the parsonage was moved to Hermosa, just south of the main Church building.

Just to the west of the Old North Church are two other historic buildings: a 1919 Old Mortuary (was Ripple Mortuary, now called the New Life Center) and the 1915 Caretaker American Craftsman home (now the offices of Christ Church Sierra Madre). Both structures were purchased by the Church in 1986.

The 1928 sanctuary has stained glass windows that were given as memorials. The north side of the sanctuary has four Apostles windows and on the south side are the four Prophets windows. The sanctuary east and west walls have two large windows, the east and the Angel window with the verse "Glory to God in the Highest." and the circular west window is "Christ the Teacher," that was given by the Women's Society and dedicated all the children of Sierra Madre. The lower south widows were a gift from Dick and Dotty Anderson in 2008. Memorial chimes were installed in 1944 into the tower, these played on the hour.

In 1971 Christ Church Sierra Madre (at the time called Sierra Madre Congregational Church) and Bethany Church started the Sierra Madre Christmas Candlelight Walk. The first Candlelight Procession was led by Pastor Bob Vander Zaag of Bethany Church and Rev. Richard Anderson of Sierra Madre Congregational Church.

In September 2018 Sierra Madre Congregational Church changed its name to Christ Church Sierra Madre.

== Gallery ==
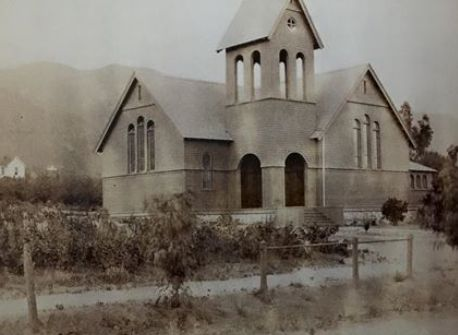
Old North Church in Sierra Madre at completion in 1890

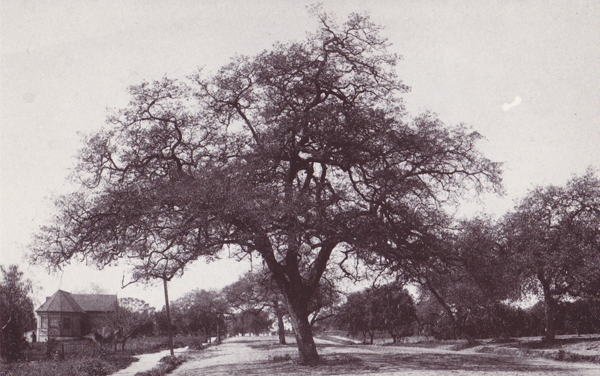
Original 1887 Sierra Madre City Library on Central Ave, renamed Sierra Madre Blvd in 1936. Sierra Madre Congregational Church temporary meeting place in 1889.

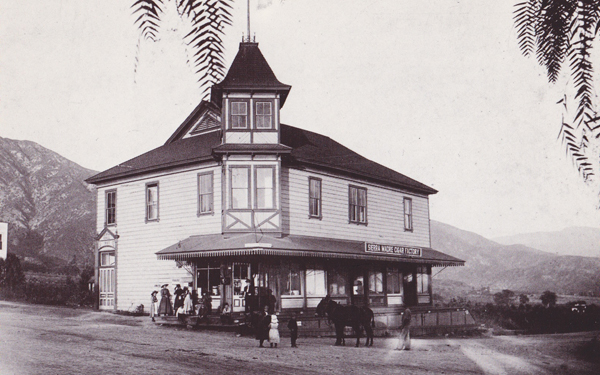
Original Sierra Madre Town Hall (with Cigar Factory next door) at Baldwin and Central Ave (now a gas station) . Sierra Madre Congregational Church temporary meeting place.

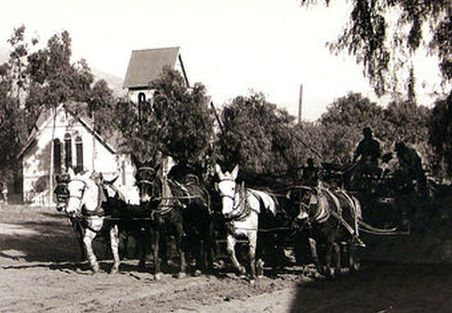
Central Ave, Sierra Madre, CA in 1905. A mule team is grading the Ave for the installation of the 1906 Pacific Electric street car, in the background is the Old North Church with the original barn roof bell tower.

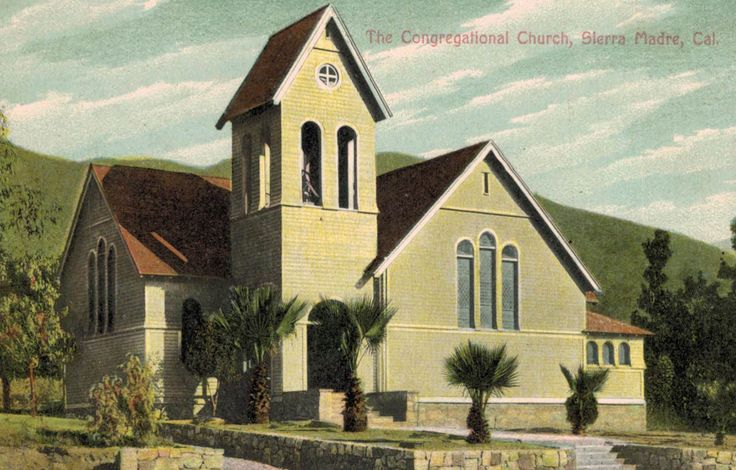
Old North Church Sierra Madre California 1909

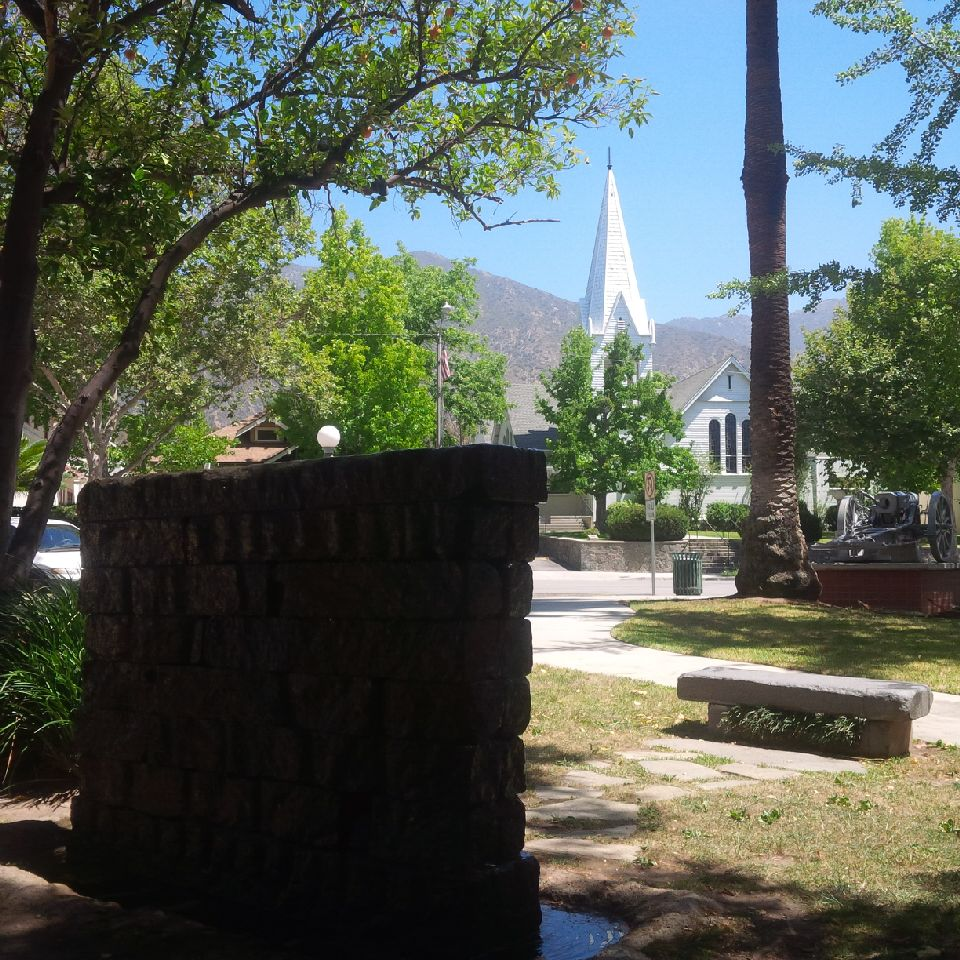
Sierra Madre Memorial Park at Sierra Madre Blvd and Hermosa looking North. From foreground to background: Weeping Wall Veterans Memorial, Sierra Madre Veterans Time Capsule bench, 1905 World War I Cannon, Sierra Madre Boulevard, The Old North Church and the San Gabriel Mountains

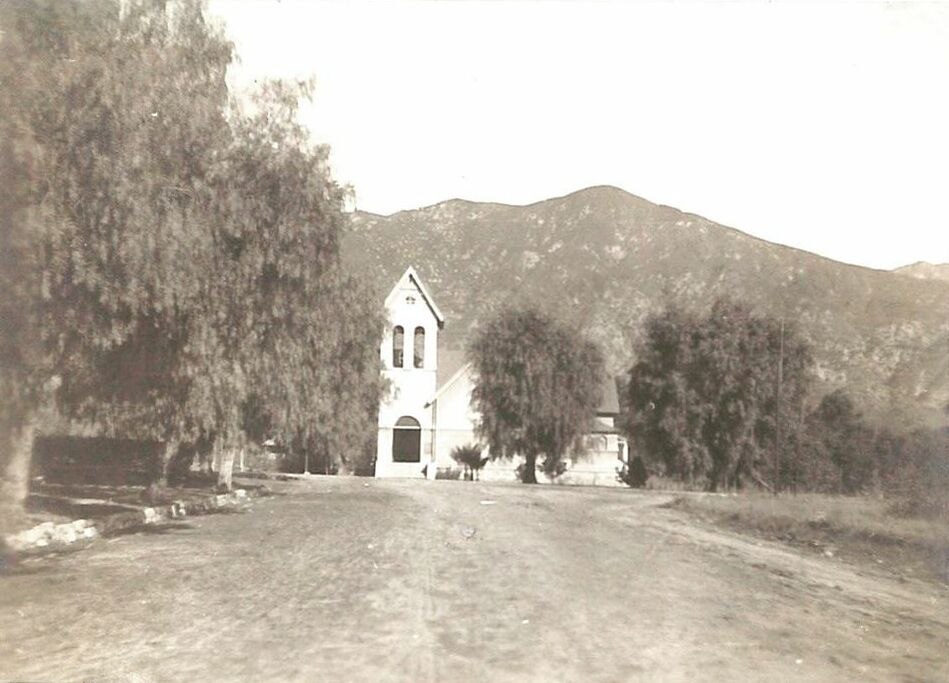
Old North Church in 1906, looking North on Hermosa Ave.

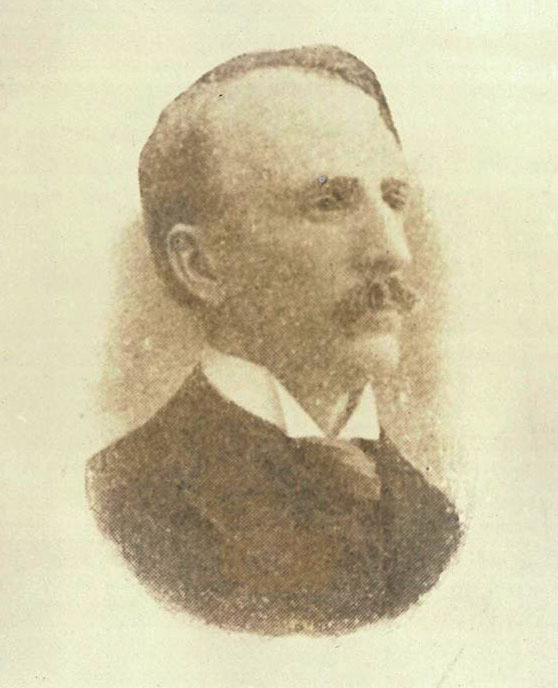
Marquis Lafayette Gordon, (1843 - 1900) first pastor from 1886 to 1887.

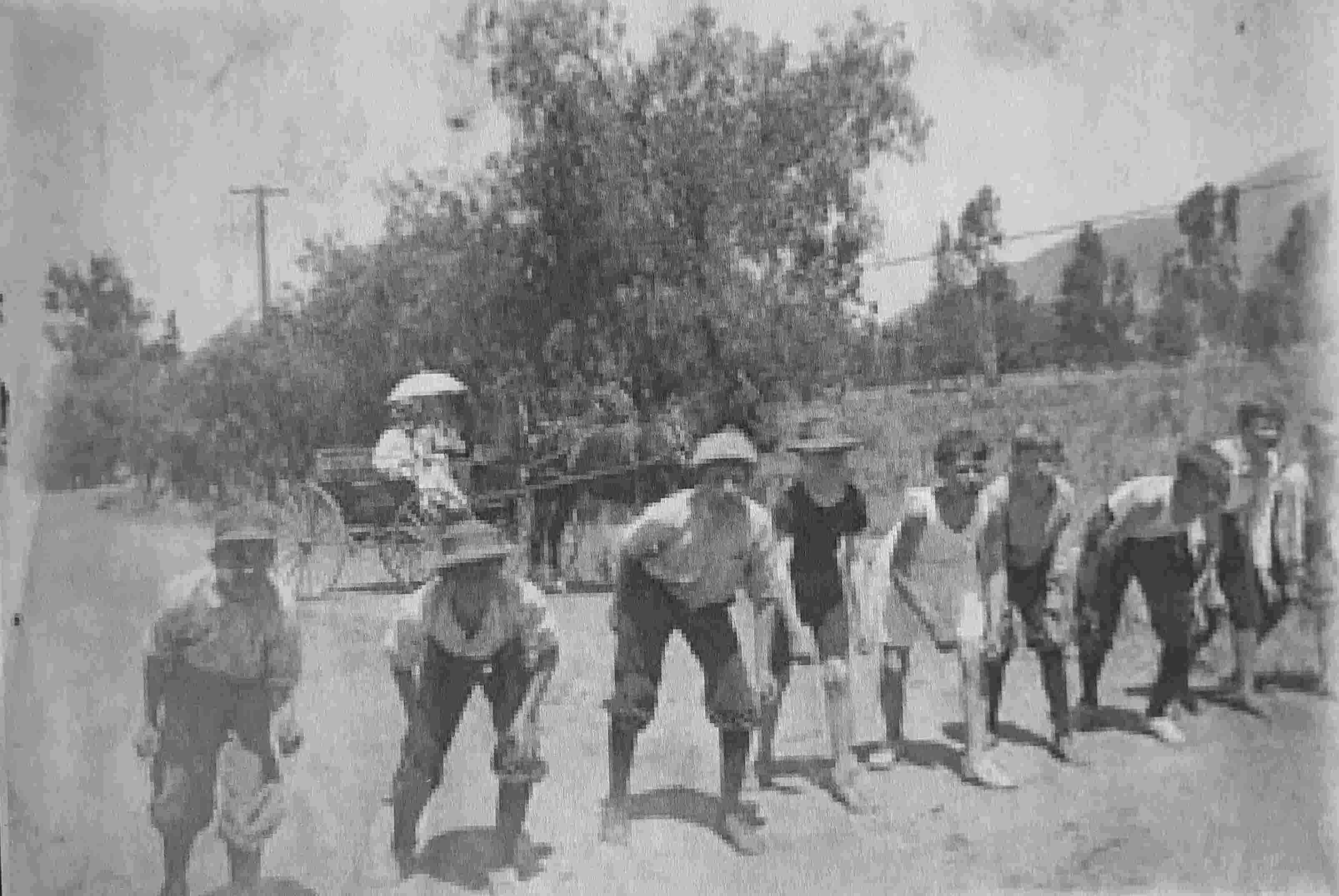
First Congregational Church of Sierra Madre Sunday foot race of Church boys in 1890 on Central Ave (Sierra Madre Blvd). Looking west, the camera is in front of the Old North Church.

Pastor Arthur O. Pritchard's Groundbreaking ceremony in 1926 of the historic Sierra Madre Congregational Church in Sierra Madre, Ca. The historic 1896 Sierra Madre Congregational Church's Old North Church in the background.

Building historic Sierra Madre Congregational Church in 1926 on Sierra Madre Blvd.

Hermosa House, Sierra Madre Congregational Church Pastor house in 1923. The Pastor's house was built in 1904, just east of the Old North Church on Sierra Madre Blvd. In 1923 the house was moved off the main blvd onto Hermosa, just south of the 1928 Church.

Sierra Madre, Ca one-room school house in 1881, at the corner of Hermosa and Grove Grove. Grove Grove was called Live Oak in 1881. Starting in 1882 on Sunday the school house was used by First Congregational Church of Sierra Madre founded by Mrs. Annetta M. Carter, wife of the city founder Nathaniel Coburn Carter. A pump organ played by W.S. Andrews and hymn books were taken to the school each Sunday till the Church moved to the original 1887 Sierra Madre City Library on Central Ave in 1889, renamed Sierra Madre Blvd in 1936. Then the original 1895 Sierra Madre Town Hall at Baldwin and Central Ave, then to the second Sierra Madre School house, on the northwest corner Baldwin and Central, just north of Kersting Court and in 1896 to the Old North Church.

Rev Ephraim E. P. Abbott, (1841-1919) pastor from 1888 to 1898

Arthur O. Pritchard, pastor at the opening of the new Church Building in 1927.

== Notable pastors ==
- Marquis (Marcus) Lafayette Gordon MD (1843-1900), pastor 1886 to 1887. First pastor, part-time. A medical missionary to Kyoto, Japan. He was in Sierra Madre for one year with his wife Agnes and four children.
- Lucien Haskell Frary, (1839-1903) pastor from 1887 to 1888
- Ephraim E. P. Abbott, (1841-1919) pastor from 1888 to 1898.
- W. H. Stubbins, (Rev. William Henry Stubbins 1869–1946) pastor 1898 to 1900.
- Rev. Charles S. Rich, (1870-1913) pastor from 1902 to 1903.
- Dr. James M. Campbell D. D., (1840-1926) pastor from 1903 to 1912
- William H. Hannaford pastor 1912, 1914-16
- Fred Staff, (?-1925) Pastor from 1913 to 1914 and again from 1923 to Nov. 1925, from 1914 to 1916 he returned to Sweden, his native country. Died while pastor. He is honored in SMCC's Fred Staff room. Came from First Congregational Church of Grand Rapids, Wisconsin.
- Rev. C. C. Wilson, pastor 1914 to 1920.
- Rev. W. J. Thompson (Rev. Dr. William J. Thompson), pastor from March 1920 to 1923 (his last church to pastor), from Sheffield came to the US in 1910, later was president of United Amateur Press Association of America.
- Arthur O. Pritchard, pastor at the time of the opening of the new building in 1928, Pritchard Hall is named after him. Pastor from 1926 to 1940. From Hollywood Congregational Church
- George Lindsay pastor from March 1956 to 1964, 20th pastor, (no Sr. Pastor till Howell)
- Rev. David Howell Jr. pastor 1966 to 1968.
- Richard (Dick) Anderson, Sr. Pastor for 40 years, from 1968 to 2008. He is honored in SMCC's Anderson Terrance.
- James J. Stewart Jr., associate pastor, then pastor at Journey Covenant Church, Redondo Beach, California and Rancho Palos Verdes, California.
- Ken Cromeenes, Pastor of Administration 1980s to 2000s.
- John H. Reed, associate pastor 1986 to 1996, former Army Chaplain.
- Tim Thompson, associate pastor (May 2002 – October 2008) and founder of The Church Works.
- Rick Bundschuh youth pastor 1978, author of Deep Like Me: (Or Another Failed Attempt to Walk on Water), and founder of Kauai Christian Fellowship in 1991.
- Jim Zeilenga, pastor of outreach from April 1987 to March 2004. then pastor at Valencia Hills Community Church, then Desert Springs Baptist Church.
- Larry Mills, minister of Christian education, 2000s
- John Eldredge associate pastor 1983–1988, now author, counselor, and lecturer on Christianity.
- Brian Anderson, youth pastor 1987–1990, now Pastor at Mission Hills Church.
- Steve Wiebe, youth pastor 1992–1999, then founder and director of Neighborhood Urban Family Center. Senior Pastor at Glendale Presbyterian Church since 2021.
- Rick Mumford, youth pastor 2004 to 2006, then with KC Metro, then Search Ministries.
- Johnny Johnston, youth pastor 2006–2010. now Jennersville Campus Pastor, Willowdale Chapel, Kennett Square, PA
- Roger Van Spronsen, associate pastor 1988–2009, now pastor at Life Christian Fellowship.
- Paul S. Beck, Sr. pastor for six years, 2008 to 2014. Now Senior PastorSenior Pastor at Loudonville Community Church
- Steve Miller, Intentional Interim Senior Pastor of Sierra Madre Congregational Church, 2014 to Nov. 2016.
- Gavin Ortlund, associate pastor (October 2014 to Nov. 2016) and former youth Pastor at SMCC (Oct. 2010-Oct 2014). Son of Raymond C. Ortlund, Jr. and Grandson of Raymond C. Ortlund Sr. Senior Pastor at First Baptist Church of Ojai from 2016 to 2023. Gavin Ortlund is now the full time head of Truth Unites, an apologetics voice to today's culture.
- Abel Burke, youth Pastor at SMCC for 6 years (2012 to March 2018), now Pastor at Ambassador Church and Redemption Bible Church San Dimas
- Dr. Hugh Ross, pastor for outreach and apologetics from 1971 to present (part-time starting in 1987, Emeritus starting 2021), Also see Reasons to Believe.
- Josh Swanson, Sr. Pastor, Dec. 2017 to present, previously with Hope Church in Albuquerque, NM. (Name changed to Christ Church Sierra Madre)
- Dr. Robert Covolo, Pastor of Theological Formation & Missional Engagement and Director of Pastoral Residency and Internship Program. 2018 to 2025. Also Affiliate Assistant Professor of Theology and Culture at Fuller Theological Seminary
- John Stothers, Care Pastor, 2017 to present, previously Church Music Director, previously music director for a number of music projects.
- Wisdom Mira Wee, first female pastor on Christ Church staff. Elders' affirm women in ministry in church bylaws for the first time in the church's history in 2024. Pastor, Youth and Young Adults Ministry, 2021 to present.

== See also ==
- Episcopal Church of the Ascension (Sierra Madre, California)
- Greater Los Angeles Area Council
