= Sierra Madre Boulevard =

Road in Pasadena, California

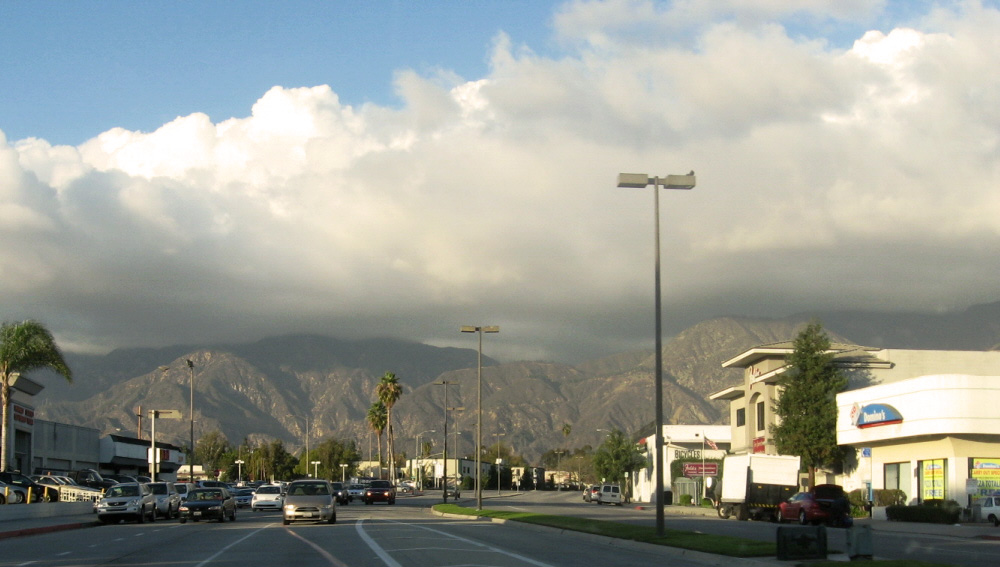
- Sierra Madre Blvd. with the San Gabriel Mountains in the background.
- West end: Huntington Drive in San Marino; 34.1219°N 118.1063°W
- East end: Elvado Avenue in Pasadena; 34.1620°N 118.0285°W

Sierra Madre Boulevard is a 6.6-mile-long (10.6 km) road connecting five suburbs of Pasadena, California; Arcadia, Sierra Madre, Hastings Ranch, East Pasadena, and San Marino.

For the most part, it is a winding road divided by a grassy median, but the part between Pasadena and Arcadia is a two-lane road.

It was built around the Pacific Electric Sierra Madre interurban railway line. The smaller and older portion of the road was originally Central Avenue in Sierra Madre, built some time in the 1860s or 1870s. The road forms a "┌" shape, starting at Elevado Avenue in Arcadia heading west and ends at Huntington Drive in San Marino. At Huntington Drive the road continues south as San Marino Avenue, then ends at Clary Avenue, near South Del Mar Avenue.

The section of Sierra Madre Boulevard between Washington Boulevard and Sierra Madre Villa Avenue is the end of the Tournament of Roses Parade. Floats are display the day after the Roses Parade on Sierra Madre Boulevard. Much of the boulevard in Pasadena has large grass median strip area between the lanes, that was part of the Pacific Electric street car in the past.

== Notable on the Boulevard ==
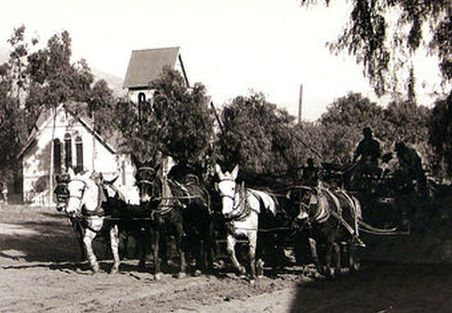
Central Ave, Sierra Madre CA in 1904, now called Sierra Madre Blvd. A mule team is grading the Ave for the installation of the 1905 Pacific Electric street car, in the background is the Old North Church with its original barn roof bell tower.

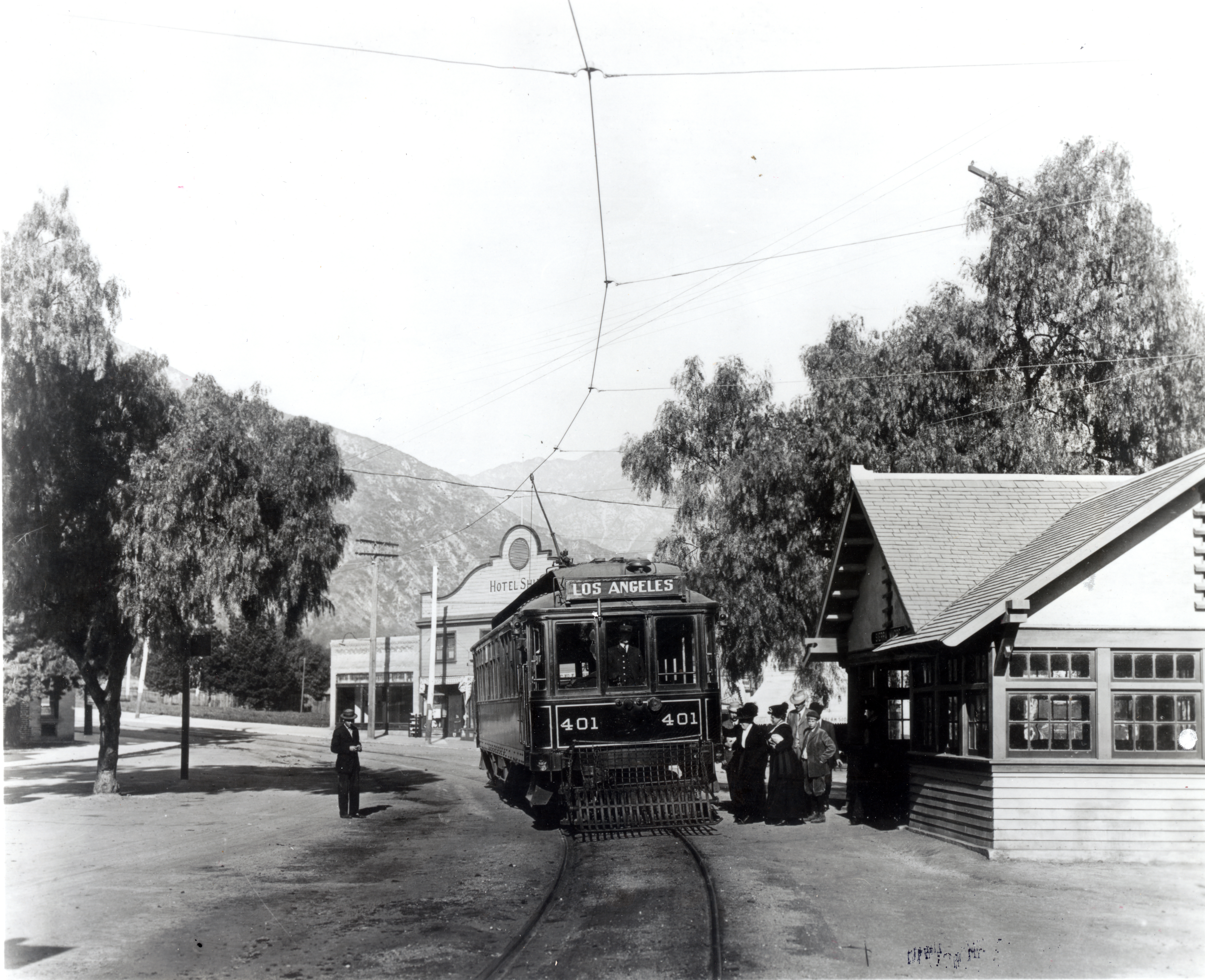
Sierra Madre Blvd. at Baldwin in 1908 with PE line Depot and the Hotel Shirley in background

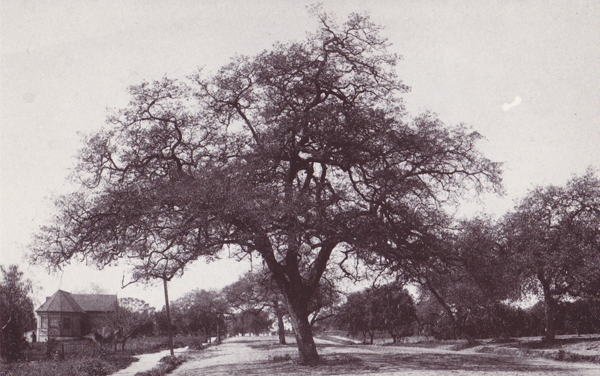
Original 1890 Sierra Madre City Library, built in 1887 on Sierra Madre Blvd.

- Santa Anita Avenue, Arcadia
- Sierra Madre Pioneer Cemetery
- Baldwin Avenue, Sierra Madre
- Jailhouse Inn, Sierra Madre
- Old North Church of Sierra Madre Congregational Church
- Sierra Madre Memorial Park
- Sierra Madre Police Department
- Sierra Madre City Hall and Fire Department
- Sierra Madre City Library
- Michillinda Avenue (Sierra Madre- Pasadena City line)
- La Salle High School, Pasadena
- Church of the Nazarene
- Field Elementary School, Pasadena
- San Gabriel Valley Council, now part of the Greater Los Angeles Area Council, Pasadena
- New York Drive (north) - Sierra Madre Villa Avenue (south)
- Eaton Canyon Golf course, Pasadena
- Washington Boulevard
- Pasadena High School
- Victory Park, Pasadena
- Orange Grove Boulevard, Pasadena
- Foothill Boulevard, Pasadena
- Interstate 210, Pasadena - L Line Metro rail
- Colorado Boulevard, Pasadena
- East Del Mar Boulevard (Pasadena - San Marino City line)
- East California Boulevard
- Huntington Drive, San Marino

== See also ==
- List of streets in the San Gabriel Valley
