= Sierra Madre Memorial Park =

Historic landmark park in Sierra Madre, California, U.S.

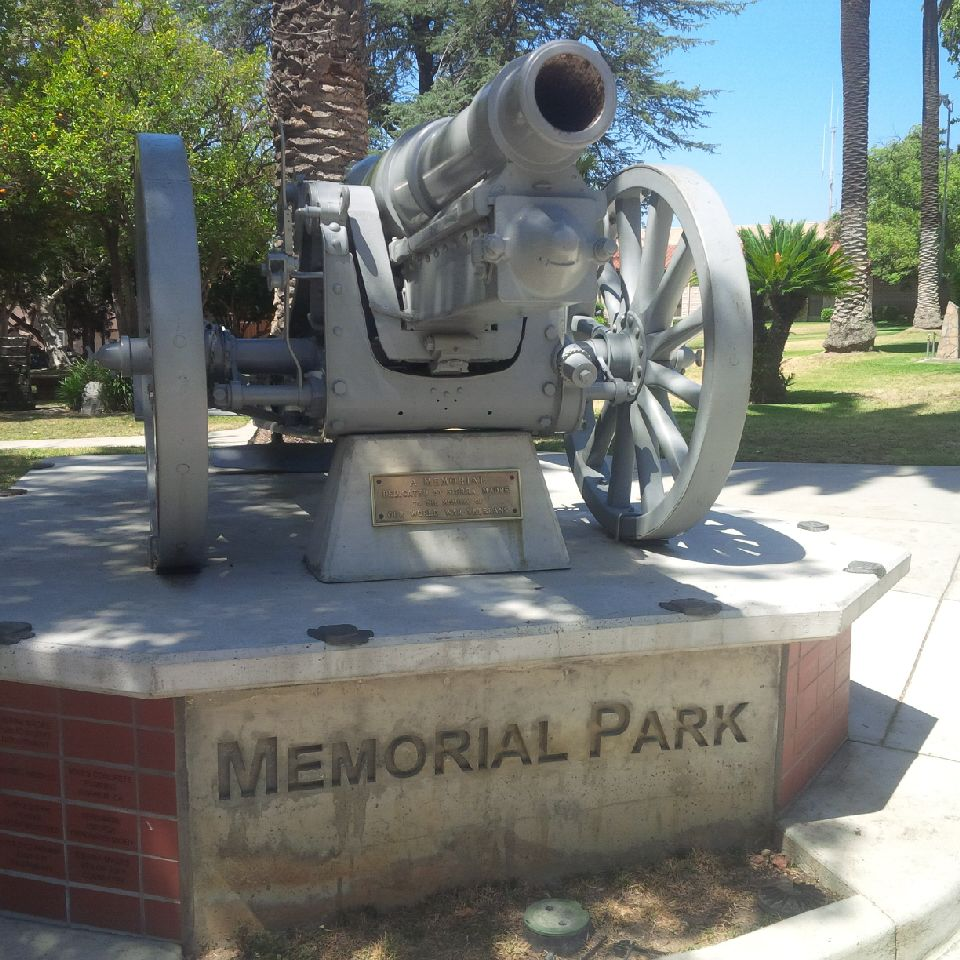
- 1905 World War I Krupp Cannon
- Interactive map of Sierra Madre Memorial Park
- Type: City Municipal Park
- Location: Sierra Madre, California
- Coordinates: 34°09′42″N 118°03′25″W
- Created: 1924
- Operator: City of Sierra Madre Parks and Recreation Department

Sierra Madre Memorial Park is a historic landmark park in Sierra Madre, California. The public park is dedicated to Sierra Madre residents who have served in the U.S. Armed forces. The park has monuments, a band shell, tennis court, playground, covered picnic area and a historic house, called the park house, that is a historic landmark. The park is on Sierra Madre Boulevard and Hermosa, next to City Hall.

== Park House ==
The Park House built in 1884, was once the winery of Professor John Jacob Hart, one of the city's founding fathers. In about 1884 Mr. Hart moved his family, (Wife Emma Corlett), from Cleveland to Sierra Madre and purchased 40 acres of land. His main instruments were the violin and piano, teaching both into his 70s. Professor Hart added to his income as a music teacher, by growing and selling his high quality "Monte Vina" wines, his winery was on his property, which ranged from Sierra Madre Boulevard on the north to Orange Grove on the south, the park house on his property was just south of Sierra Madre blvd. In 1980 the house was dedicated as the Senior Citizens’ Center Memorial Park House. It was of adobe construction. After many renovations the house has few of its original construction, but the original grand fireplace remains. The house is site #42 on Sierra Madre historic landmark list. There are 50 properties listed on Sierra Madre's Designated Historical Properties List. Hart help establish the city's first public library, he also helped bring the Pacific Electric street car to town in 1905 on the Sierra Madre Line, it ran each day till service ended in 1950. At the start of housing subdivision construction south of Central Avenue, now called Sierra Madre Boulevard, Hart insisted on some of the streets having Spanish names. These included Mariposa, Ramona, Manzanita and Esperanza avenues. The park house is used by the Veterans of Foreign Wars Post 3208 of Sierra Madre once a month.

== Monuments ==
- In 1926, a 1905 World War I cannon was dedicated and placed in the park. The 150 mm howitzer field artillery cannon was built by the Fried Krupp A.G. Corporation of Essen, Germany. The U.S. confiscated the cannon, then gave it to the City of Pasadena with a twin, Pasadena gave the cannon to Sierra Madre for its Memorial Park. In October 2007 the refurbished World War I cannon was re-dedicated.
- The Weeping Wall Veterans Memorial was dedicated on April 24, 1999, it was designed by Lew Watanabe. Monument reads: "Dedicated to all the armed forces veterans of Sierra Madre, Who served our country in peace and war... who helped to preserve peace and freedom for our city, country and the world. The wall weeps... not with sorrow, but with pride. God bless them all. April 1999."
- The Sierra Madre Veterans Time Capsule, dated April 24, 1999, holds Sierra Madre veterans' memorial memorabilia. It is near the Weeping Wall.
- The Veterans’ Photo Wall was dedicated on October 11, 2003. In front of the wall is also a flag pole
- The Monument to the Unknown Scout was dedicated on February 13, 1948. There is a plaque on the Monument that reads: "Dedicated to the unknown boy scout in honor of all boy scouts of Sierra Madre past and present who served in World War II, February 13, 1948". Three scout leaders that returned from World War II worked to have a city monument to honor both the scouts that served in World War II and the unknown Scout that help bring scouting to the USA. A Ceremony is held each year by Troop 373 of Sierra Madre to remember the World War II Scouts and the Unknown Boy Scout.

== Events ==
Events are held throughout the year: Sierra Madre's Wistaria Festival and Arts & Crafts Fair, summer Concerts in the Park, Movies in the Park, Firefighter's Easter Egg Hunt, 4 July Festivities, Friends of the Library Art Fair, City Halloween costume judging, Pioneer Days Historic Photo Exhibit, American Cancer Society Relay for Life, Blood Drives and more.

After World War I, Sierra Madre held parades on Memorial Day, Veterans Day and Independence Day. Veterans, Scouts and City officials would march from Sierra Madre Memorial Park to Sierra Madre Pioneer Cemetery. While the Memorial Day and Veterans Day Parades have ended. The Independence Day Parade continues each year. A Memorial Day service is held in Sierra Madre Pioneer Cemetery at 11am each year, hosted by the VFW and Troop 373 of Sierra Madre Congregational Church.

Each Memorial Day since 1924 Sierra Madre VFW Post 3208 with Boy Scouts of America Troop 373 of Sierra Madre places flags and crosses at the graves of military veterans. Veterans of the American Civil War, both Union and Confederate, Spanish–American War, World War I and World War II and the Korean War are buried at Sierra Madre Pioneer Cemetery.

== Gallery ==
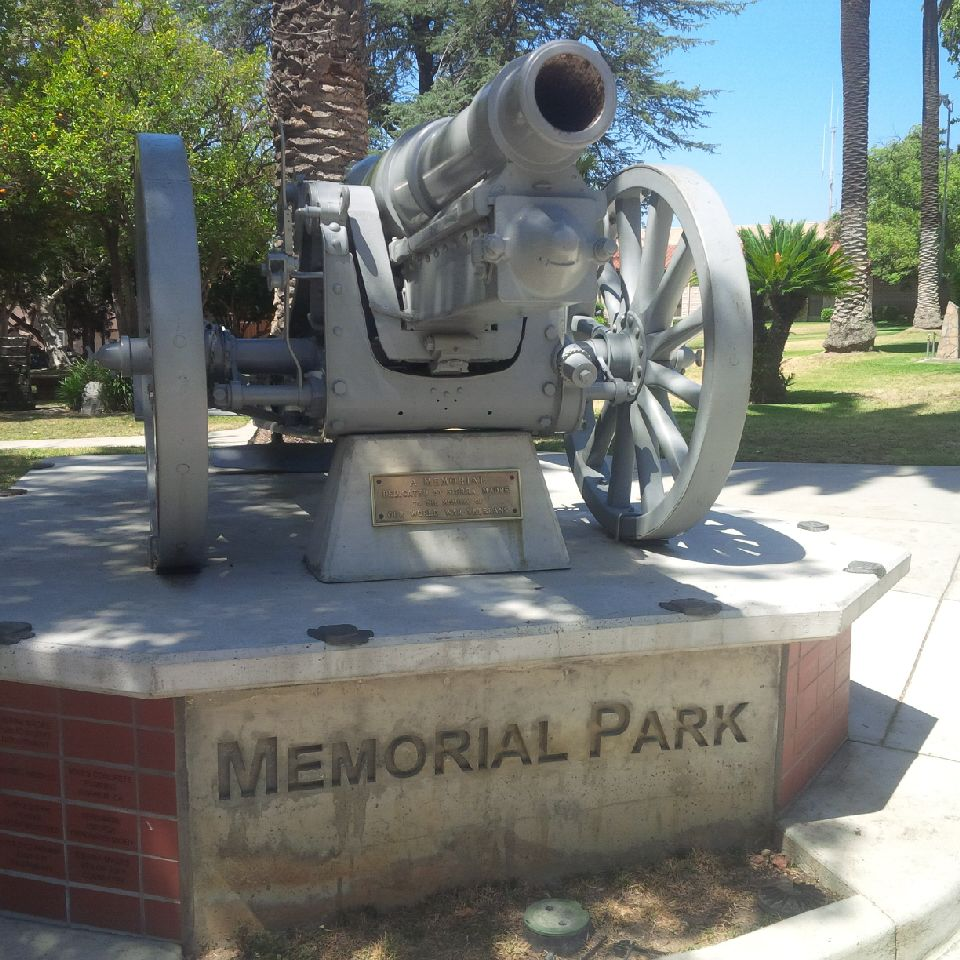
1905 World War I Krupp 150mm field artillery Cannon, at the corner of Sierra Madre Blvd and Hermosa

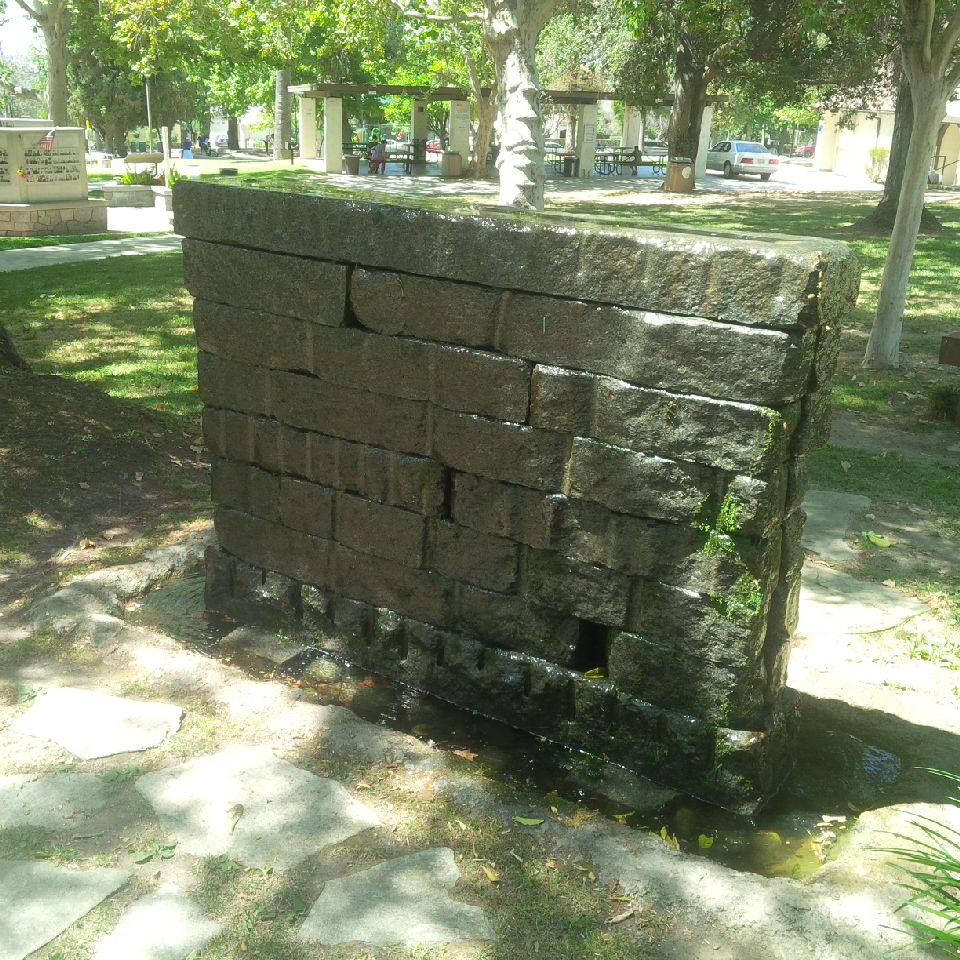
Weeping Wall Veterans Memorial, at Sierra Madre Memorial Park

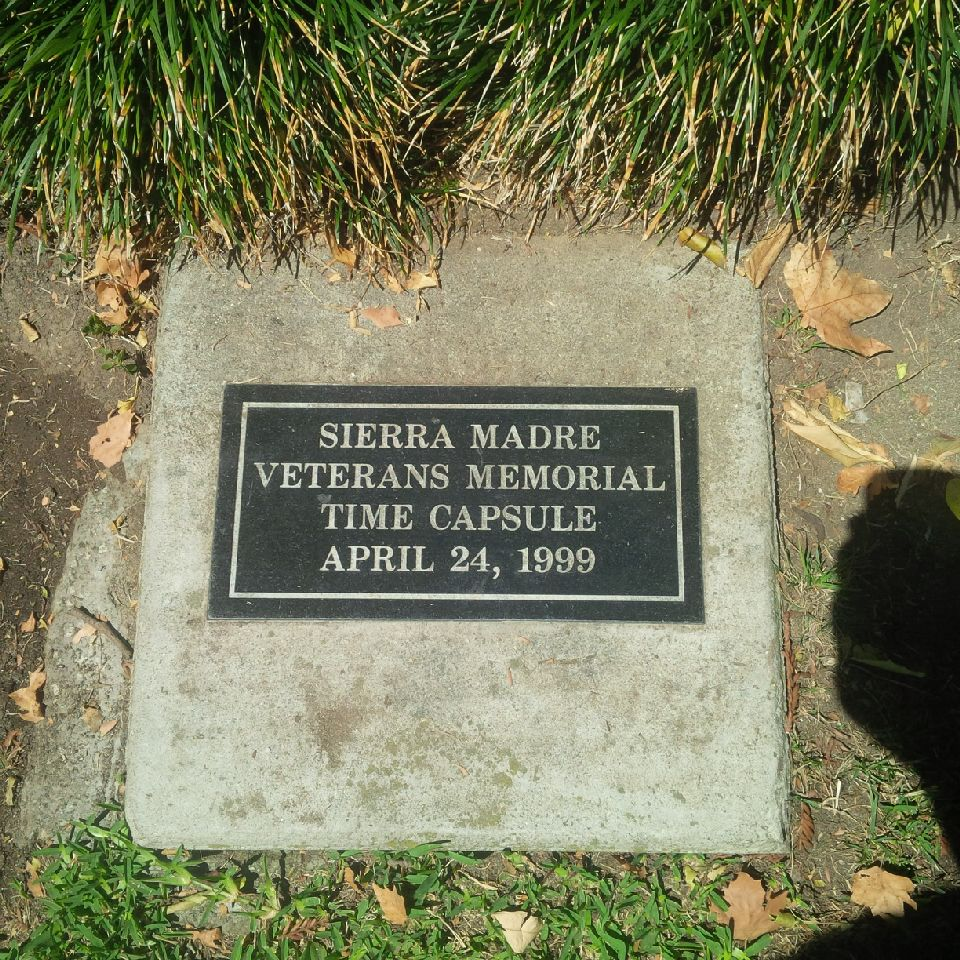
Sierra Madre Veterans Time Capsule

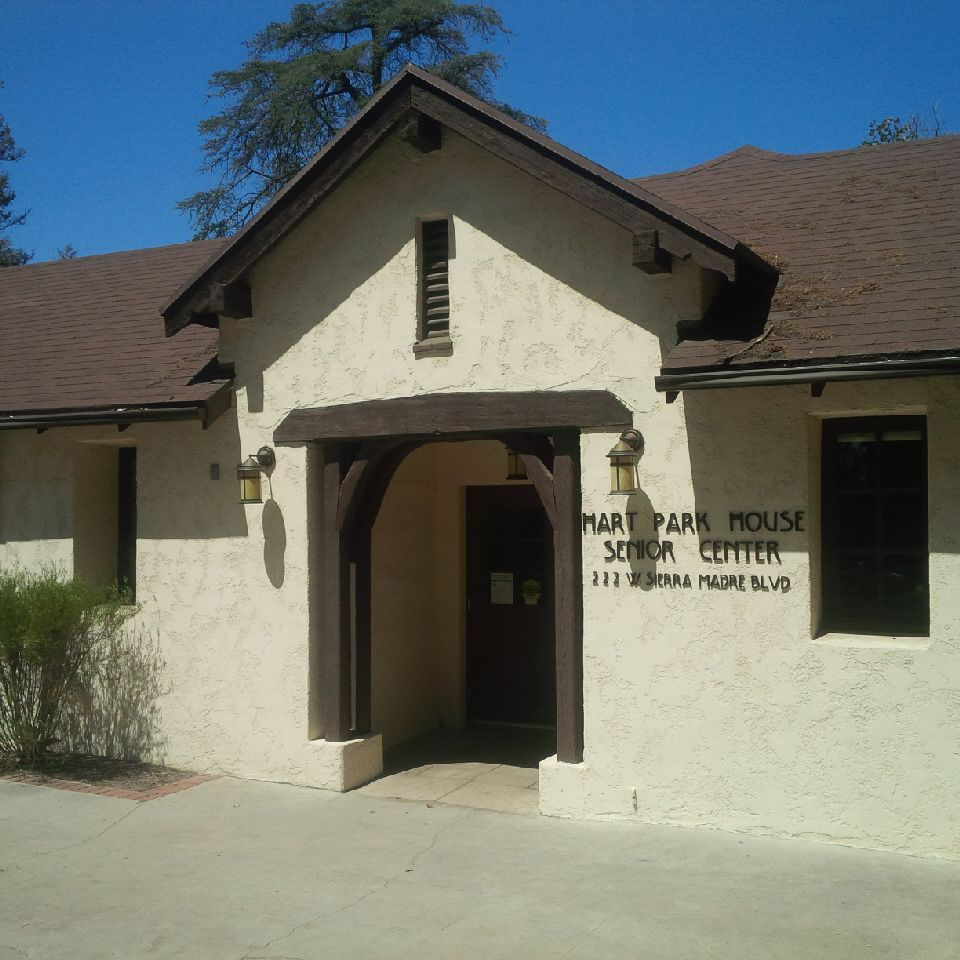
Park House built in 1884, was the winery of Professor John Jacob Hart, one of the city's founding fathers. In 1980 the house was dedicated as the Senior Citizens’ Center. The house is site #42 on Sierra Madre historic landmark list.

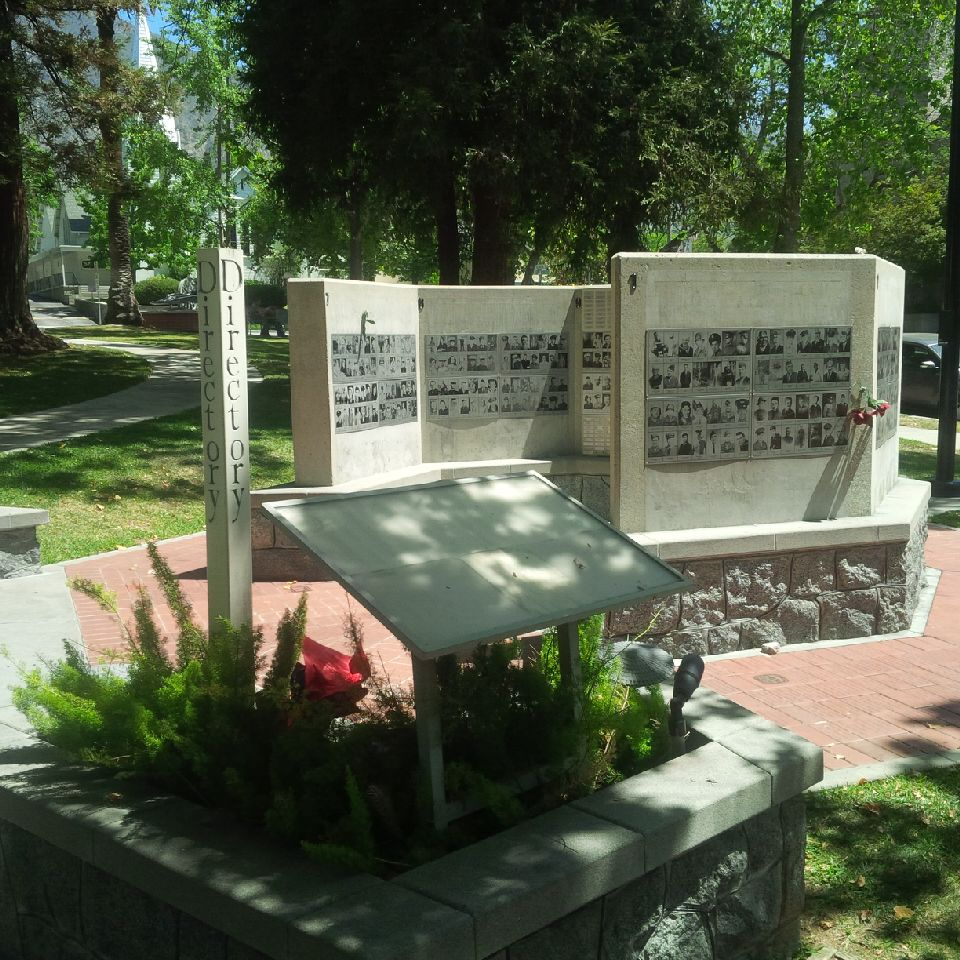
Veterans’ Photo Wall was dedicated on October 11, 2003.

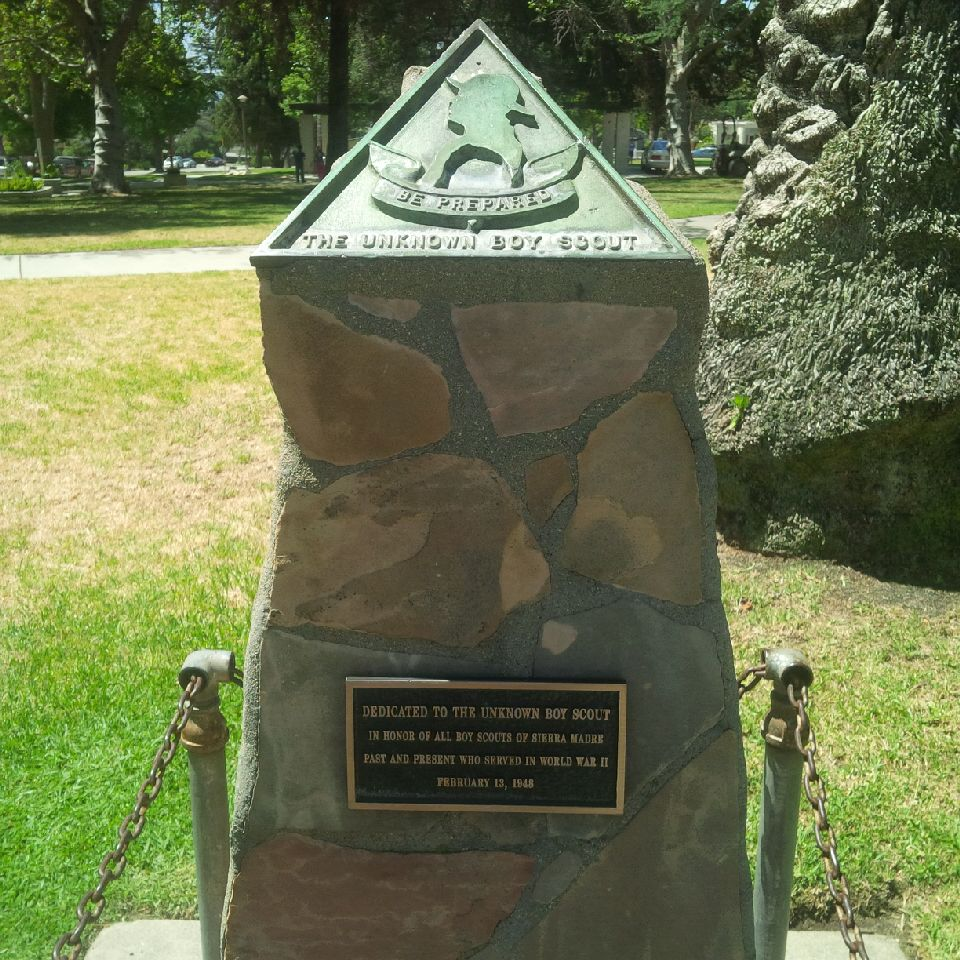
Monument to the Unknown Scout was dedicated on February 13, 1948. Dedicated to the unknown boy scout in honor of all boy scouts of Sierra Madre past and present who served in World War 2, February 13, 1948.

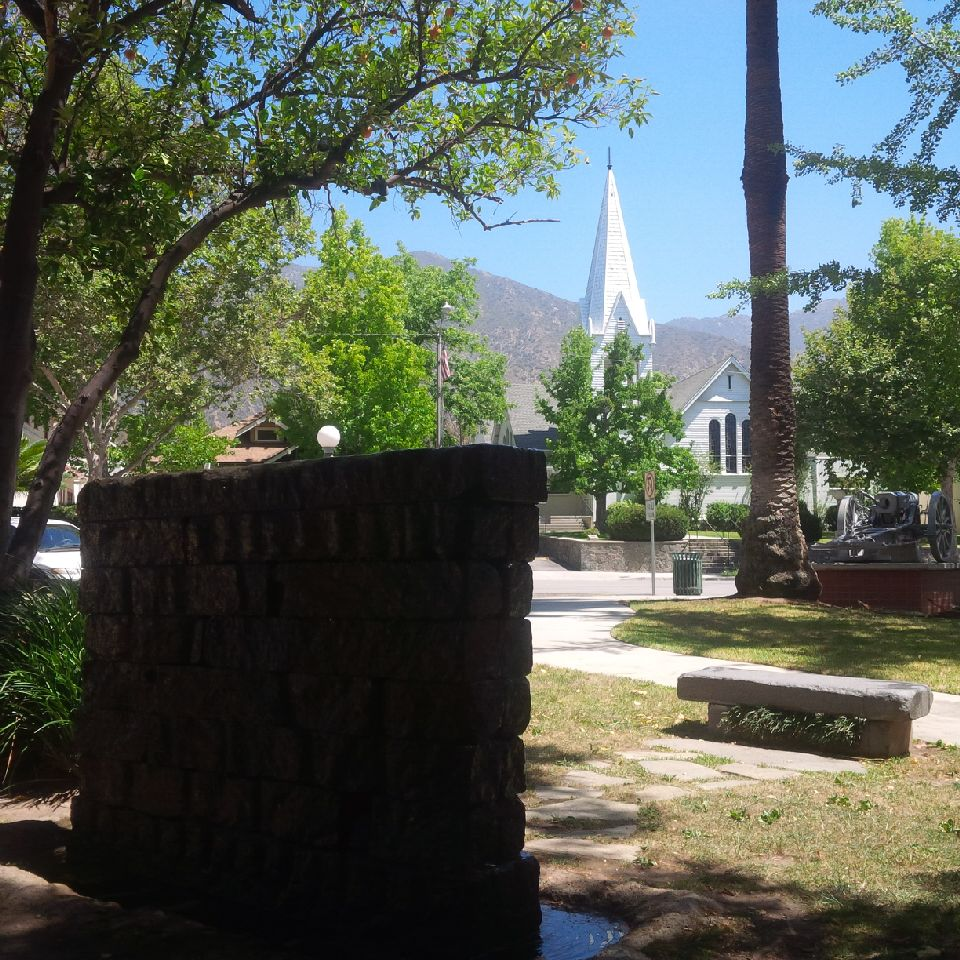
Park at Sierra Madre Blvd and Hermosa looking North. From foreground to background: Weeping Wall Veterans Memorial, Sierra Madre Veterans Time Capsule bench, 1905 World War I Cannon, Sierra Madre Boulevard, Old North Church built in 1890, a Sierra Madre historic landmark and the San Gabriel Mountains.

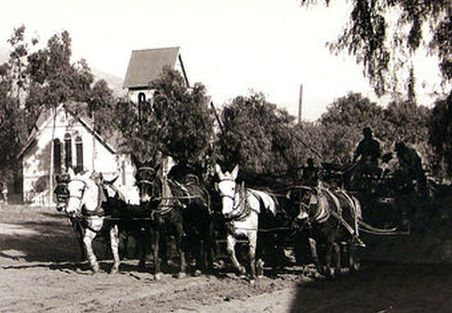
Central Ave, Sierra Madre CA in 1904. A mule team is grading the Ave for the installation of the 1905 Pacific Electric street car, in front of Sierra Madre Memorial Park, the background is the Old North Church with the original barn roof bell tower.

== See also ==
- Old North Church (Sierra Madre, California) Historic landmark #40 in Sierra Madre.
- Episcopal Church of the Ascension (Sierra Madre, California) Historic landmark #7 in Sierra Madre.
