= Jeffrey E. Barlough =

American biologist and veterinarian

Jeffrey E. (Ernest) Barlough
- Born: 1953 (age 72–73); Los Angeles, California, U.S.
- Occupations: Biologist, Veterinarian, Novelist
- Writing career
- Genres: Dark fantasy, Horror fiction, Alternate History
- Website: www.westernlightsbooks.com

Jeffrey E. Barlough (born 1953) is an American biologist, veterinarian, and novelist. In 1986, Barlough was a lecturer at the New York State College of Veterinary Medicine at Cornell University. He is also the author of several dark fantasy novels that comprise his Western Lights series, set in an alternate world in which the last ice age never ended.

== Selected bibliography ==
=== Medical books ===
- Manual of Small Animal Infectious Diseases (Editor) (1988)
- UC Davis Book of Dogs: The Complete Medical Reference Guide for Dogs and Puppies (Editor, with Mordecai Siegal) (1995)
- UC Davis Book of Horses: A Complete Medical Reference Guide for Horses and Foals (Editor, with Mordecai Siegal and Victoria Blankenship Siegal) (1996)

=== Western Lights novels ===
The Western Lights series is a gaslamp fantasy alternate history series which takes place in a world where the last Ice Age never ended, and in which an unknown cataclysm called the "sundering" - believed to be a volcanic eruption or a meteor strike - obliterated most life on Earth and worsened the Ice Age. The surviving English colonies along the west coast of North America are isolated from the outside world and, two hundred years after the sundering, remain culturally and technologically in the Victorian era. The series takes its name from the fact that the west coast of North America is "the sole place on earth where the lights still shine at night."

- Dark Sleeper (1998, first trade edition 2000)
- The House in the High Wood: A Story of Old Talbotshire (2001)
- Strange Cargo (2004)
- Bertram of Butter Cross (2007)
- Anchorwick (2008)
- A Tangle in Slops (2011)
- What I Found at Hoole (2012)
- The Cobbler of Ridingham (2014)
- Where the Time Goes (2016)
- The Thing in the Close (2018)
- Hooting Grange (2021)
