= Sierra Madre Pioneer Cemetery =

Historic site in Los Angeles County, California

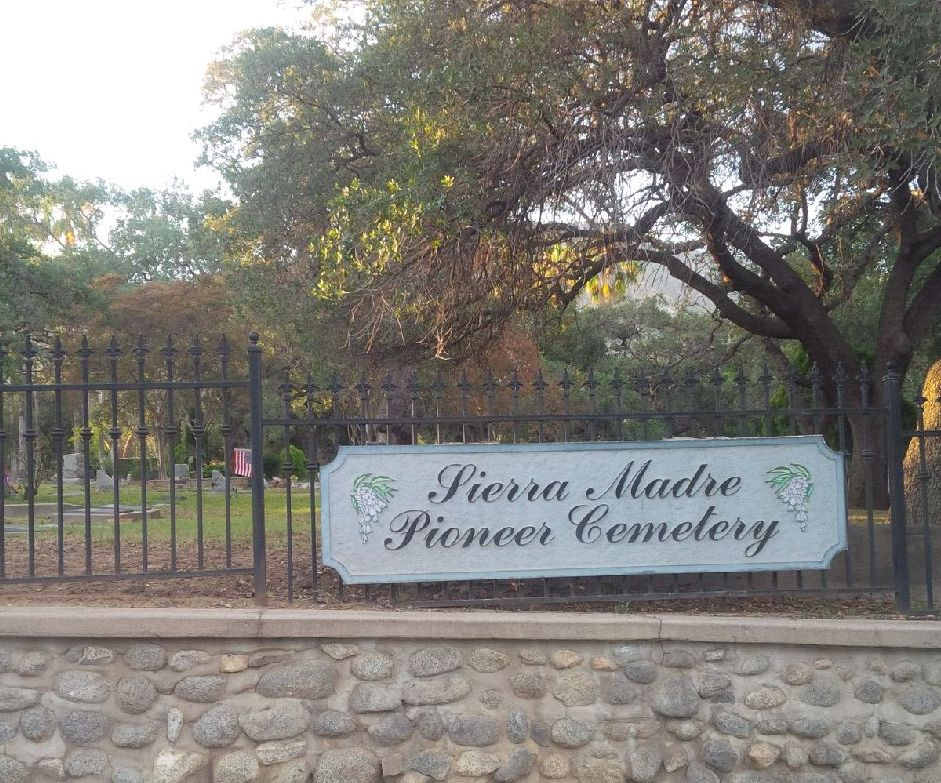

- Location within the Los Angeles metropolitan area
- 34°09′45″N 118°02′30″W
- Location: 535 E. Sierra Madre Blvd. Sierra Madre, California, US

History
- Built: 1881

Site notes
- Area: 2.19 acres (0.89 ha)

Sierra Madre Pioneer Cemetery, is a cemetery and a historic landmark in Sierra Madre, California.

== History ==
In 1881, Nathaniel Coburn Carter purchased land located along Central Ave., later renamed Sierra Madre Boulevard, for use as a Cemetery for the new city.

The cemetery is located on a 2.19-acre (10,117 m²) site on Sierra Madre Blvd and Coburn Ave. It is the area's oldest cemetery. John E. Richardson, a Civil War veteran and Carter's servant, became the first person interred in the Cemetery on July 3, 1882. Of the first seventeen families that lived in Sierra Madre, when it was founded in 1881, twelve of them are buried in the cemetery.

Sierra Madre Pioneer Cemetery is a historic landmark #45 in Sierra Madre. There are fifty-three properties listed on Sierra Madre's Designated Historical Properties List.

Each Memorial Day since 1924 Sierra Madre VFW Post 3208 with Boy Scouts of America Troop 373 of Sierra Madre places flags and crosses at the graves of military veterans. Veterans of the American Civil War, both Union and Confederate, Spanish–American War, World War I and World War II and the Korean War are buried at Sierra Madre Pioneer Cemetery.

After WW I, Sierra Madre held Parades on Memorial Day, Veterans Day and 4th of July Independence Day. Veterans, Scouts and City officials would march from Sierra Madre Memorial Park to Sierra Madre Pioneer Cemetery. While the Memorial Day and Veterans Day Parades have ended. The Independence Day Parade continues each year. A Memorial Day service is held in Sierra Madre Pioneer Cemetery at 11am each year, hosted by the VFW.

In February 1881, Nathaniel Carter purchased the original 1103 acres that comprised the new city of Sierra Madre. The land was acquired in three purchases: 845 acres of Rancho Santa Anita from Lucky Baldwin, 108 acres from the Southern Pacific Railroad Company and 150 acres from John Richardson (1811–1884).

Carter transferred 20 feet by 20 feet family sized cemetery plots to city citizens in the early years. He died in 1904 and his widow, Anneta M. Carter, continued to sell family plots by request.

After decades of no formal caretaking the cemetery fell into neglect with upkeep only from volunteers, family members of those interred, or local members of the Veterans of Foreign Wars and American Legion. The Sierra Madre Cemetery Association was organized in 1961 and the cemetery is well cared for now. The only new spaces available are in the new Memorial Garden which is an area for cremains and the area on the east side which was expanded in 1999.

Sierra Madre Pioneer Cemetery is next to Sierra Vista Park, Dapper Baseball Field, the City Yard and the city settling basins.

== Notable interments ==
This is a partial list of notable people interred at Sierra Madre Pioneer Cemetery by name, years of birth and death, and a short description.

- Annetta M. (née Pierce) Carter (1846–1937), wife of Sierra Madre founder.
- Nathaniel Carter (1840–1904), founder of Sierra Madre.
- Almarian Decker (1852–1893), American pioneer of electrical engineering
- Louise Gunning (1879–1960), American soprano singer
- Donald Gray (1933–2016), Air Force, NASA's Jet Propulsion Laboratory in Pasadena Chief Navigator of the Navigation Team for Voyager 2.
- Professor John Jacob Hart (1843–1932), one of the founding fathers of Sierra Madre, music teacher and SM winery owner.
- Gordon MacMillan (1901–1970), first Chief of Police of Sierra Madre, California.
- William H. Newbery (1925–2009), World War II Veteran (Bronze Star Medal – Battle of the Bulge), owner of Bill's Bicycle Center in Sierra Madre, Boy Scout Leader, volunteer Fireman with SMFD, Sierra Madre VFW 3208 Commander and member of 75th Division Veterans Association
- John E. Richardson (1844–1882), first burial at this cemetery. His tombstone no longer exists; it was removed by vandals.
- Louis (Ludovicus) Van Iersel (1893–1987) cenotaph, World War I Congressional Medal of Honor Recipient.
- Charles E. Whittingham (1913–1999), legendary horse trainer, his death in 1999, at 86, was announced during the races at Santa Anita Park and the crowd stood for a moment of silence.
- Alan Wood (1922–2013), supplied the American flag being raised in the historic Raising the Flag on Iwo Jima.
- Father Roger Wood, (1923–2017), a canon of the Episcopal Church in the diocese of Los Angeles. Brother of Alan Wood (military officer).

== See also ==
- Old North Church (Sierra Madre, California) Historic landmark #40 in Sierra Madre.
- Episcopal Church of the Ascension (Sierra Madre, California) Historic landmark #7
