= Bartstow, Alberta =

Locality in Alberta, Canada

Coordinates: 50.88342°N 113.15192°W

Bartstow is a locality in Alberta, Canada.

Bartstow derives its name from the last name and middle initial of F. W. Stobart, a local storekeeper.
