= Barlow Respiratory Hospital =

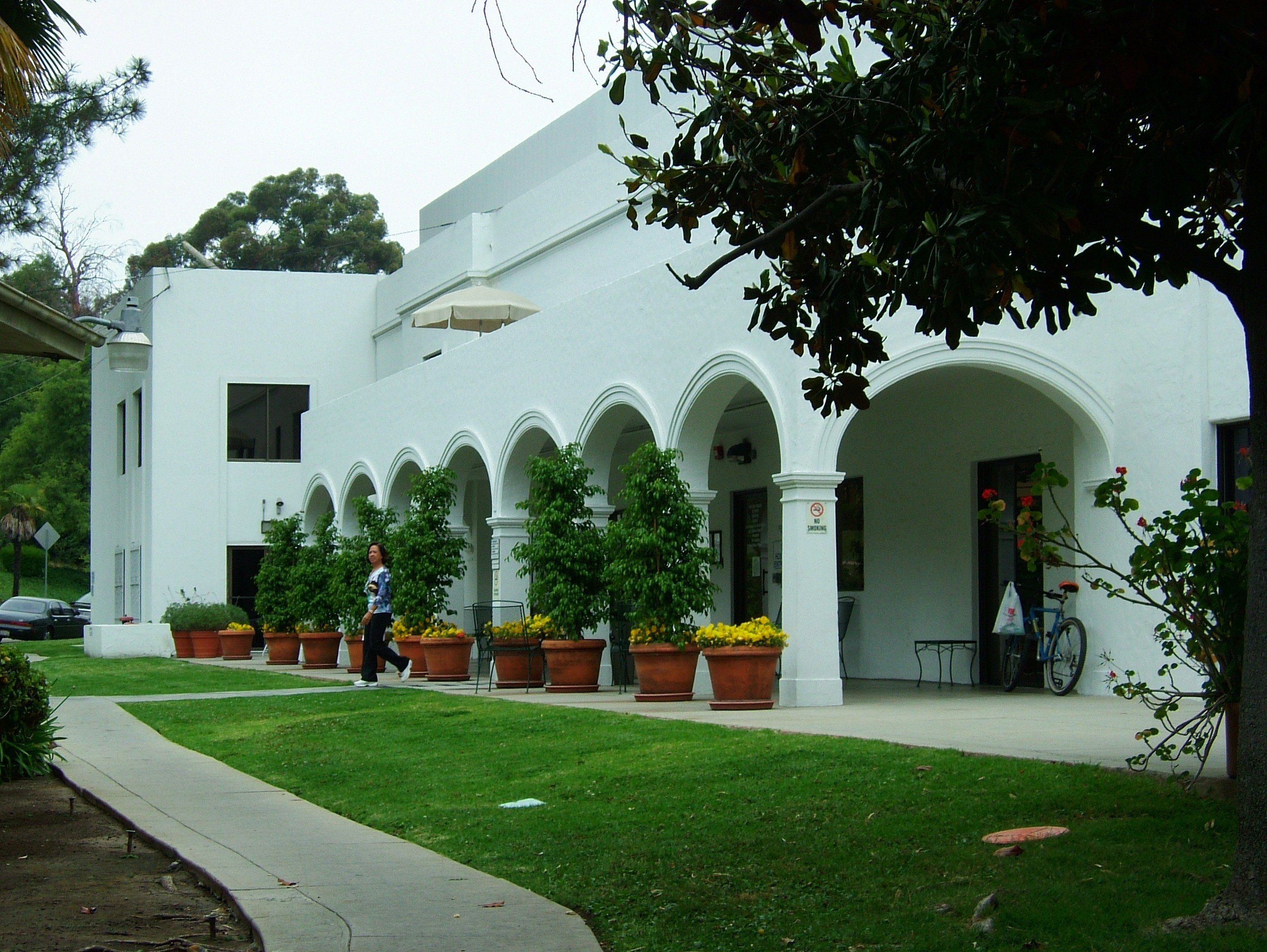
- Barlow Respiratory Hospital

- Location in Los Angeles

Geography
- Location: 2000 Stadium Way, Los Angeles, California, United States
- Coordinates: 34.076°N 118.248°W

History
- Founded: 1902

Links
- Lists: Hospitals in California

Los Angeles Historic-Cultural Monument
- Official name: Barlow Sanitorium
- Designated: October 9, 1990
- Reference no.: 504

The Barlow Respiratory Hospital is a hospital located in the Elysian Park neighborhood of Echo Park, near Dodger Stadium in Los Angeles, California. The hospital operates satellite sites in Van Nuys, California and in Whittier, California. It is formerly known as Barlow Sanitorium.

Originally a tuberculosis sanatorium, Barlow Respiratory Hospital is a long-term acute care facility and a regional weaning center in Los Angeles that specializes in weaning chronically critically ill patients from mechanical ventilation and also treats respiratory diseases and related secondary ailments. The hospital treats approximately 900 patients a year and specializes in ventilator weaning.

== Population ==
The hospital serves an ethnically diverse population that mirrors the diversity of Los Angeles County. Eighty percent of patients are from Los Angeles County while the remaining 20% are admitted from surrounding counties, national and international medical facilities. Patients are primarily older, suffer from medically complex conditions and are admitted after hospitalization in ICU and when a longer hospital stay is needed before discharge to a non-hospital setting or home.

== Programs ==
The hospital has four primary treatment programs. Through these programs, it is able to care for conditions that are often associated with respiratory diseases, thus promoting a holistic model of treatment.

=== Ventilator Weaning Program ===
Barlow's TIPS Ventilator Weaning Protocol / Ventilator Weaning: Barlow Respiratory Hospital is recognized for a ventilator weaning success rate of nearly 60%, among the highest rate in the nation. The Barlow TIPS (Therapist-Implemented Weaning Protocol) Ventilator Weaning Protocol was developed by Barlow board-certified pulmonologists based on years of specialized respiratory care practice.

Barlow TIPS protocol has been adopted as a standard of excellence in hospitals nationwide. The Barlow team of health care professional helps patients previously unable to be liberated or "weaned" from the ventilator at other hospitals. Patients are guided through a step-by-step method, implemented and monitored by respiratory care practitioners, to recover independent breathing.

=== Wound care program ===
Many patients entering the hospital have been bedridden for long periods of time. This often requires specialized care in order to treat the resulting bed wounds.

=== Care for chronically critically ill ===
Led by board-certified physicians, the Barlow team provides care for chronically critically ill patients. On-site physicians and consulting specialists guide the care of patients with: cardiac (heart) diagnoses, neurological conditions, infectious diseases, kidney disease, and blood disorders, as well as those with complex respiratory care needs. Through assessment and intervention, Barlow's team strives to resolve acute medical conditions, allowing patients to move from the acute care setting to another level of care, or home.

=== ReBuild Barlow ===
Barlow Respiratory Hospital CEO Amit Mohan announced a Master Plan to ReBuild Barlow With The help of Zakian Woo Architects. The multi-phased plan, which began in 2018, includes a major seismic upgrade and brings a long-planned hospital expansion and modernization project to fruition. Hospital structures built between 1902 and 1983 required seismic reinforcement and additional upgrades. The ReBuild Barlow project concludes the required major seismic retrofit and allows the hospital to continue to operate while a new hospital is being constructed.

=== Academic Partner ===
Barlow has served as a teaching hospital for medical students at the Keck School of Medicine of USC and the David Geffen School of Medicine at UCLA and as a clinical training site for respiratory therapy, nursing, physical, occupational, speech therapy and clinical nutrition allied health professionals.

== History ==
Walter Jarvis Barlow founded the Barlow Sanatorium in 1902. He received his MD degree in 1892 from Columbia University. Though he was born and raised in New York, he was forced to move west in search of a dry and sunny climate after contracting tuberculosis in 1895 and moved to Sierra Madre, California. The sanatorium was founded on 25 acres (10 ha) of meadowland next to the city-owned Elysian Park on Chavez Ravine Road. The location seemed ideal because the surrounding configuration of hills provided for clean air and the neighboring Elysian Park seemed to insure against any future development. The land was purchased for $7,300. Patients were housed in tent cottages that were constructed so that patients would have maximum exposure to fresh air and sunlight; at that time these elements were of primary importance in order to recover from tuberculosis. In the early days of the Barlow Sanatorium patients lived by strict rules; one document read:

Patients must not expectorate anywhere except in cups provided for that purpose. Cloths are to be used as handkerchiefs and burned morning and evening. Patients must not discuss their ailments or make unnecessary noise. Patients must not put anything hot on glass tables. Lights out at 9 p.m. Cold plunge every morning; hot baths Tuesday and Saturday. Patients are forbidden to throw water or refuse of any kind on the ground. When doctors think them able, every patient must do some work about the Sanatorium or go away. Patients disobeying these rules will be dismissed.

As the century continued, medical advances made tuberculosis a less serious threat in the United States. Because of this, the tuberculosis sanatorium shifted its focus towards chronic respiratory diseases and secondary related diseases.

The site was named a Los Angeles Historic-Cultural Monument in 1990.

== Timeline ==
- 1902 – Founder Walter Jarvis Barlow, M.D., attempting to recover from tuberculosis himself moved west in search of a milder climate. During this year he established Barlow Sanatorium to care for others with tuberculosis.
- 1925 – The Solano Infirmary, the original hospital structure, burned down, but quick action by the fire department prevented any loss of life. By 1927, the infirmary reopened.
- 1937 – Dr. Walter Jarvis Barlow, founder of the Barlow Sanatorium, died at the age of 69.
- 1938 – An official affiliation was forged with the University of Southern California Medical School that continues today.
- 1944 – Effective treatment for tuberculosis was first developed, which brought much promise for those suffering with this disease.
- 1960s – Barlow Sanatorium transforms into a hospital for chronic respiratory diseases.
- 1970 – Barlow begins to admit patients for weaning from prolonged mechanical ventilation.
- 1990 – Barlow Respiratory Research Center was established.
- 1994 – The Barlow Foundation was incorporated.
- - Barlow Respiratory Research Center published “Weaning from Prolonged Mechanical Ventilation: The Experience at a Regional Weaning Center”
- 1997 – The first satellite facility opened at Presbyterian Intercommunity Hospital in Whittier – now named PIH Health Hospital-Whittier.
- 2001 – Barlow Respiratory Research Center published “Outcomes in Post-ICU Mechanical Ventilation: A Therapist-Implemented Weaning Protocol”
- 2007 – The second satellite facility opened at Valley Presbyterian Hospital in Van Nuys.
- - Barlow Respiratory Research Center published multicenter studies of weaning outcomes at long-term care hospitals "Ventilator-Dependent Survivors of Catastrophic Illness Transferred to 23 Long- Term Care Hospitals for Weaning from Prolonged Mechanical Ventilation" and "Post-ICU Mechanical Ventilation at 23 Long-term Care Hospitals: A Multicenter Outcomes Study"
- 2015 – New CEO, Amit Mohan, joins the Barlow Respiratory Hospital team.
- 2016 – Awarded Gold Seal of Approval ® for Disease Specific Certification for Respiratory Failure by the Joint Commission
- – Awarded Passy-Muir Center of Excellence for treating patients with tracheostomies
- – Barlow Respiratory Research Center transitioned to Barlow Respiratory Hospital Center for Outcomes &amp; Value
- 2017 – Barlow Respiratory Hospital Center for Outcomes &amp; Value published first annual “Outcomes Book”
- 2018 – Barlow Respiratory Hospital announces campaign to ReBuild Barlow, to create a new hospital within the walls of existing hospital building.
- – ReCertified Award Gold Seal of Approval ® for Disease Specific Certification for Respiratory Failure by the Joint Commission
- July 2018 – June 2019 the observed weaning rate for ventilated patients at Barlow Respiratory Hospital was 65%, the national rate was 51%, the rate for Pacific Region was 38%
- 2019 – Barlow Foundation holds An Evening Under the Stars dinner to Benefit the Campaign to ReBuild Barlow, on the hospital's historic Los Angeles campus.
- For the time period 1989 – 2018, Barlow Respiratory Hospital produced 4 book chapters, 28 peer-reviewed journal articles, 5 editorials, and 68 abstracts on weaning outcomes and other clinical topics specific to LTAC patients.
- Barlow Respiratory Hospital reports clinical outcomes in publications of book chapters, peer-reviewed journal articles, editorials and abstracts and in conference presentations.

== Buildings on the campus ==
Buildings on campus

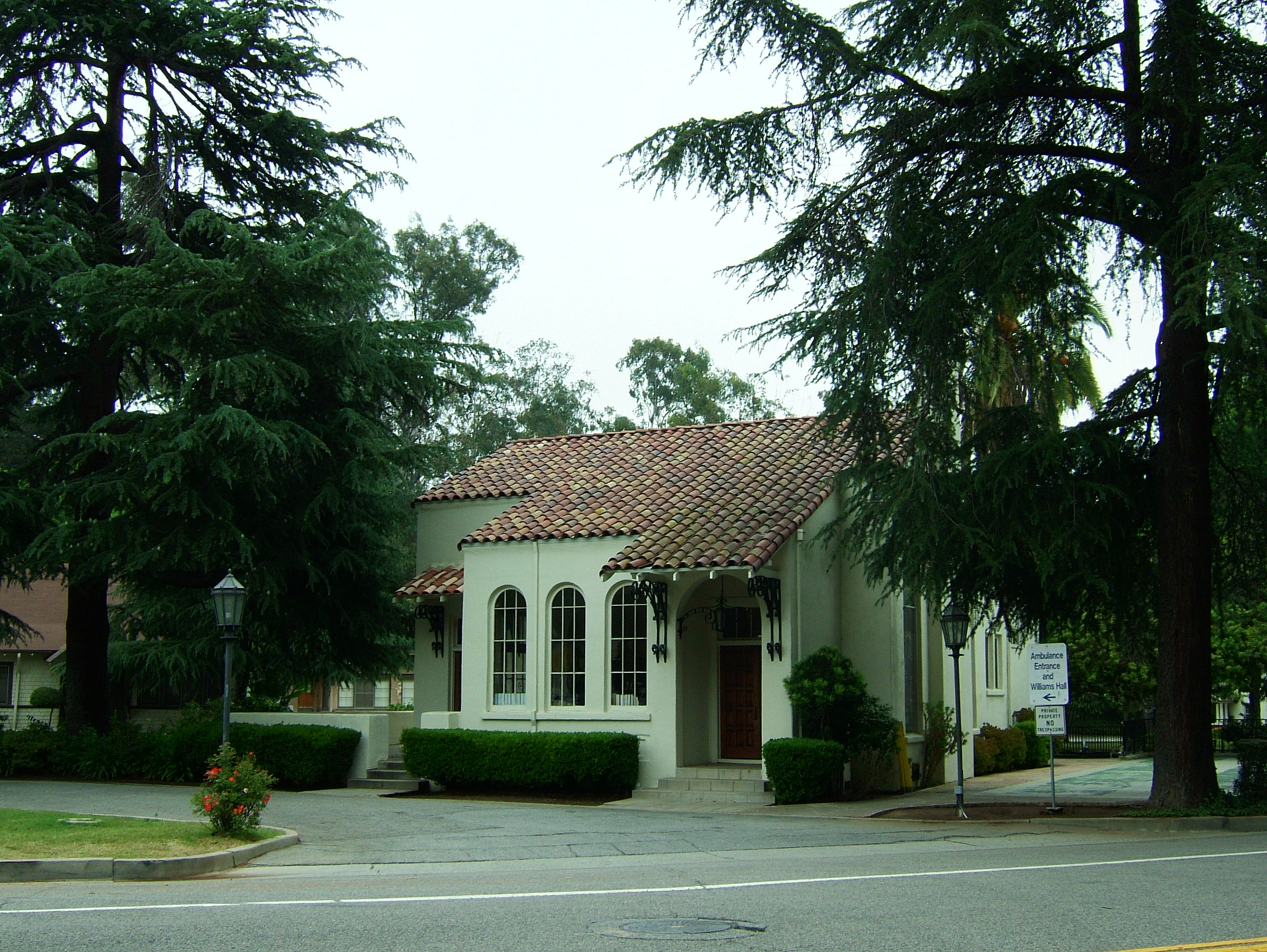
The library

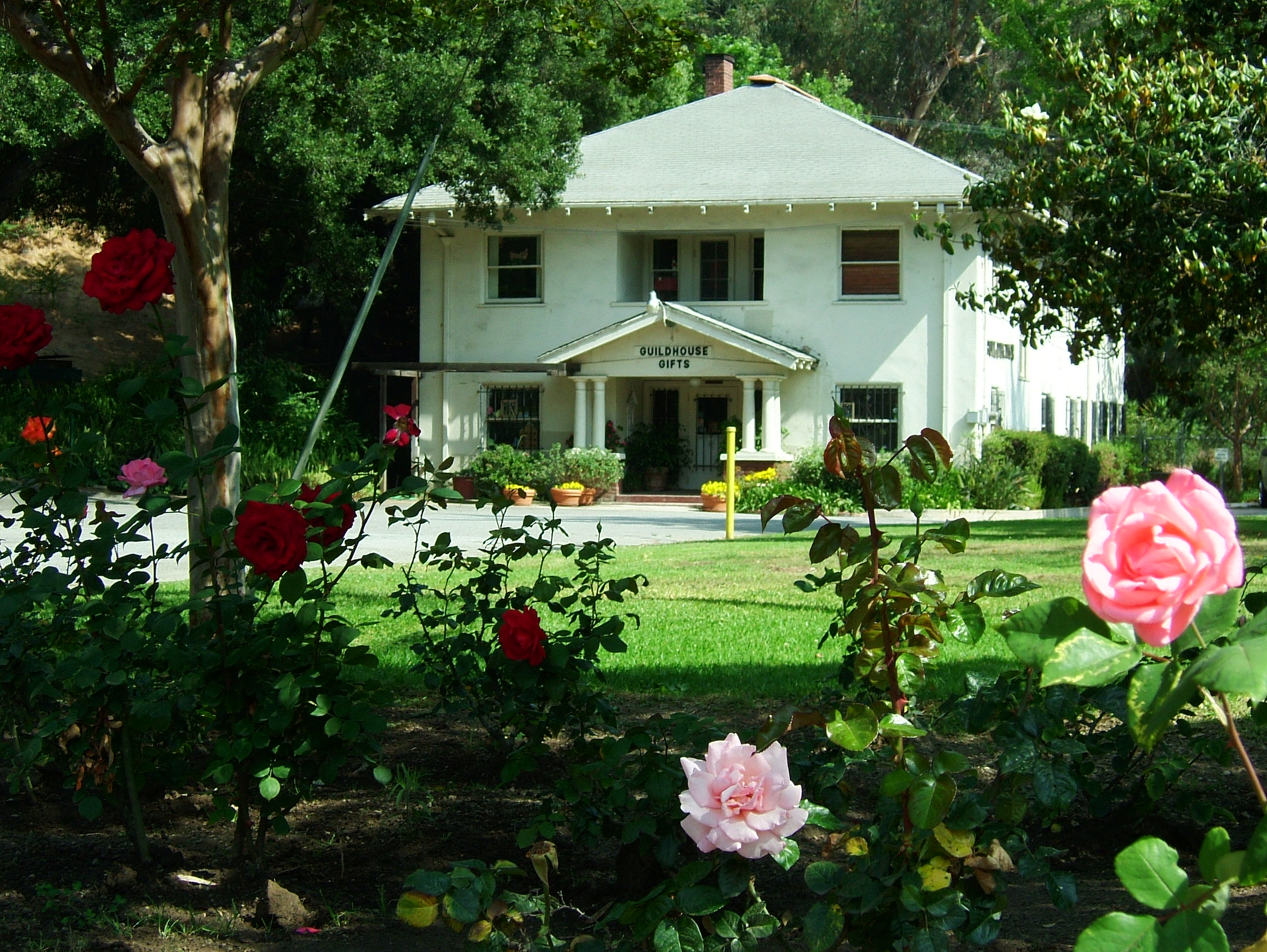
The Guildhouse

Barlow Respiratory Hospital maintains a 25-acre campus with cottages, a library, the main hospital, and a community hall. Old chicken coops are still standing on the outskirts of the campus. This layout can be attributed to the hospital's history as a tuberculosis sanatorium where patients lived for several years.

=== Cottages on the campus ===
Originally tuberculosis patients lived in tent cottages in order to be exposed to free flowing air. As time went on permanent cottages were added to the campus by donors. The architecture of the bungalows is in the California bungalow style. During World War I many servicemen contracted tuberculosis and were sent to the Barlow Sanatorium. Because of this the Los Angeles Chapter of the American Red Cross built and furnished four four-room cottages for military patients, some of which are still in use today.

=== The library ===
Dedicated to the sanatorium on May 6, 1922, this stucco and red tiled library is still in use. It was paid for by the Los Angeles Optimists Club and has stained glass windows donated by James Slauson and a second by Mrs. Helena Torrance in memory of her husband, Jared Sidney Torrance. Jared Sidney Torrance had served on Barlow's Board of Trustees since 1910 as vice president and president. The library underwent renovations in 1992.

=== The Guildhouse ===
The Guildhouse was originally the "Men's Help" quarters, where the men working in the hospital would live. In 1975 the old building was converted into a gift and plant shop. This was funded by the Barlow Guild, a large group of ex-patients dedicated to philanthropy, and the Guildhouse opened in April of that year. The Guildhouse closed in 2014. After an extensive renovation the Guild House reopened in 2021 as adaptive reuse of a historically significant building to serve as administrative offices and communications hub.

=== The hospital ===
In 1903, the original hospital of the Barlow Sanatorium was a permanent cottage with 13 rooms, two baths and 12 patient beds. It was built with donations from Mr. and Mrs. Alfred Solano, and was consequently named the Solano Infirmary. In September 1925, the Solano Infirmary burned down. In 1927 Alfred's wife, Mrs. Ella Brooks Solano, provided for the creation of a new infirmary, the Ella Brooks Solano Infirmary, a building that is still in use as the main hospital today. In 2018, the hospital announced a Master Plan to ReBuild Barlow including a seismic reinforcement of the existing historic facility. A new hospital will be built within the walls of an existing, adjacent hospital building.
