= Barlow Pass =

Barlow Pass may refer to one of these mountain passes in the United States:

- Barlow Pass (Oregon)
- Barlow Pass (Washington)
