= Barlow's disease =

Barlow's disease may refer to

- Infantile scurvy (named after Sir Thomas Barlow (1845–1945)), who showed that the infantile scurvy is the same disease as adult scurvy.
- Mitral valve prolapse (named after Dr. John Brereton Barlow (1924–2008)), who first described it in 1966.
