= Memorial Park station =

Light rail station in Pasadena, California

Memorial Park
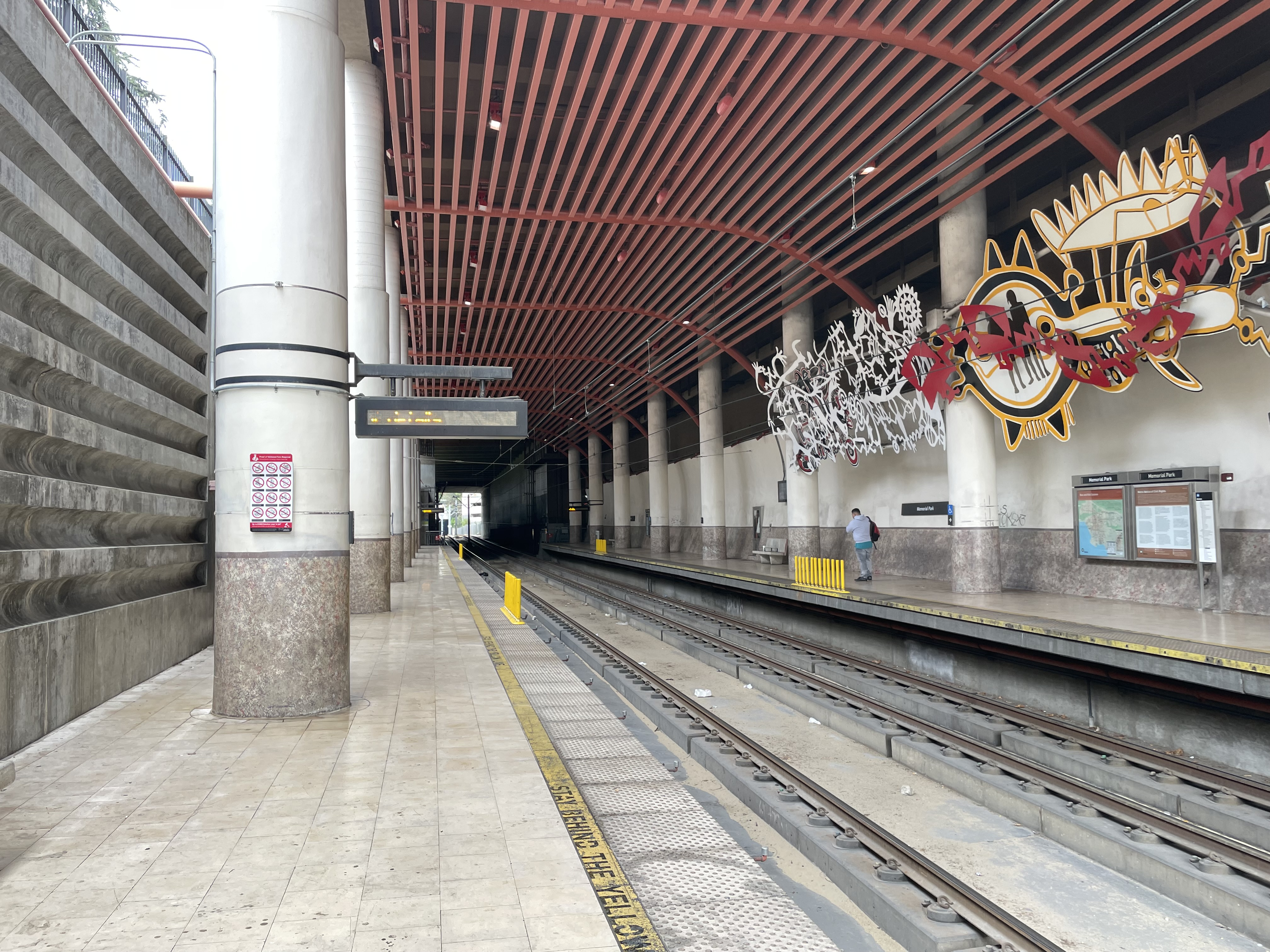
- Memorial Park station platforms in 2023, with artwork at upper right

General information
- Location: 125 East Holly Street; Pasadena, California
- Coordinates: 34.1476°N 118.1479°W
- Owner: Los Angeles County Metropolitan Transportation Authority
- Platforms: 2 side platforms
- Tracks: 2
- Connections: See Connections section

Construction
- Structure type: Below-grade
- Cycle facilities: Racks and lockers
- Accessible: Yes

History
- Opened: July 26, 2003

Passengers
- FY 2026: 1,502 (avg. wkdy boardings)

Services
Preceding station	Metro Rail	Following station
Del Mar toward Long Beach	A Line	Lake toward Pomona
Former services
Preceding station	Metro Rail	Following station
Del Mar toward East Los Angeles	L Line	Lake toward Azusa
Future services
Preceding station	Metro Busway	Following station
Colorado/Townsend toward North Hollywood	North Hollywood to Pasadena Bus Rapid Transit Project	Colorado/Los Robles toward Colorado/Hill
Location

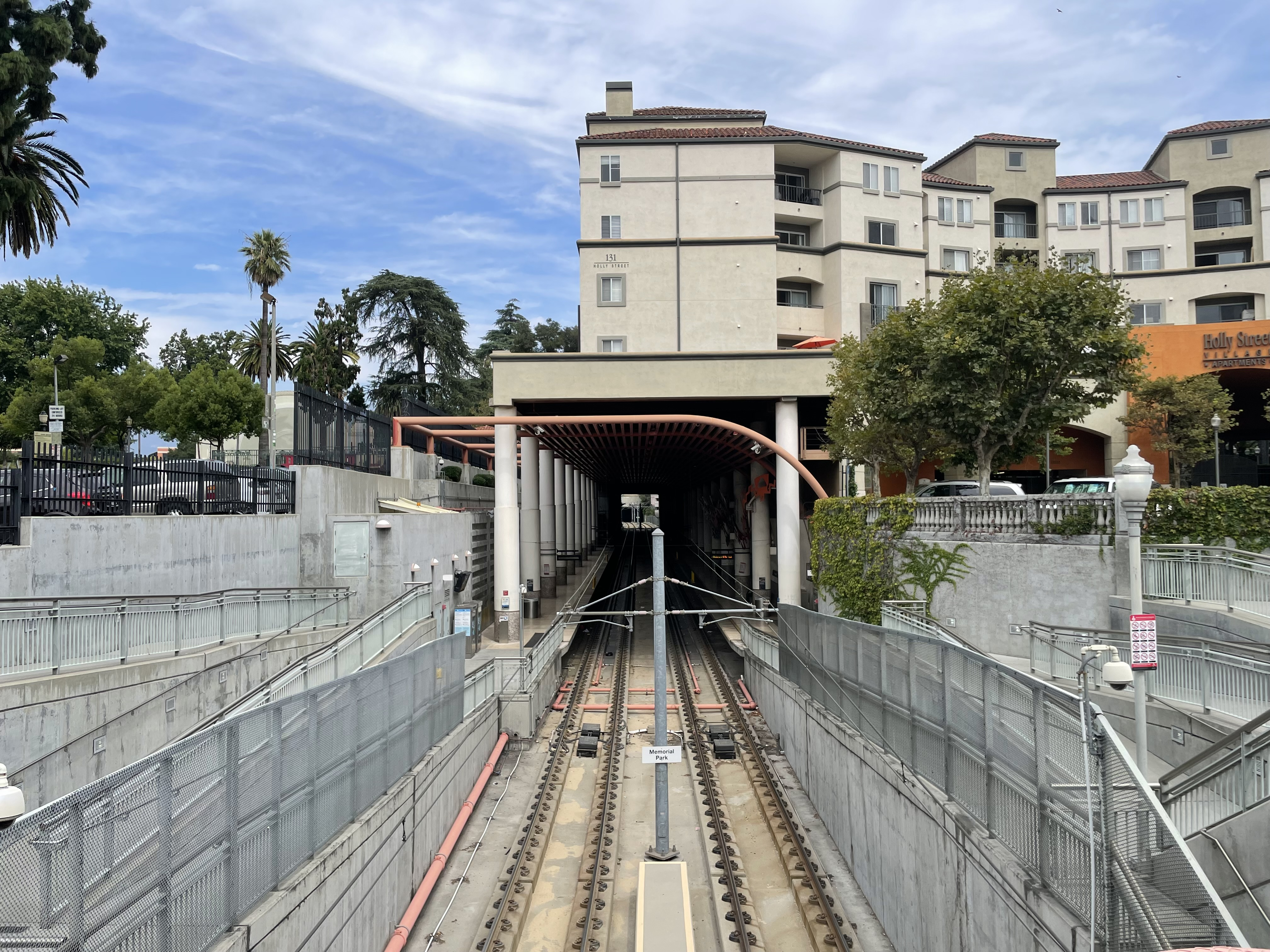
View towards the station

Memorial Park station is a below-grade light rail station on the A Line of the Los Angeles Metro Rail system. It is located at Holly Street and at the end of Arroyo Parkway in Pasadena, California. The station is named after the nearby Memorial Park and is situated on the northern edge of Old Town Pasadena.

Memorial Park station was built in a trench beneath the Holly Street Village Apartments, which was constructed with the trench in 1994 in anticipation of a light rail station at this site. Memorial Park station opened on July 26, 2003, as part of the original Gold Line, then known as the "Pasadena Metro Blue Line" project.

The station features a work of art, The First Artists in Southern California: A Short Story, created by artist John Valadez. The over 100-foot-long (30 m) artwork, fabricated from aluminum, honors cave paintings made by the indigenous peoples of the Pasadena area.

It is one of the A Line stations near the Rose Parade route on Colorado Boulevard and is heavily used by people coming to see the parade. The station is also located near the Rose Bowl Shuttle, which stops at the Parsons Corporation building and offers service to most events at the stadium. During the 2028 Summer Olympics, the station will serve spectators traveling to and from the Rose Bowl.

== Service ==
=== Hours and frequency ===
A Line service hours are from approximately 4:30 a.m. and 11:45 p.m. daily. Trains operate every 8 minutes during peak hours, Monday to Friday. Trains run every 10 minutes, during midday on weekdays and weekends, from 9:00 a.m. to 7:00 p.m. Night and early morning service is approximately every 20 minutes every day.

=== Connections ===
As of September 19, 2025, the following connections are available:

- ArtCenter College of Design Shuttle (students/staff only)
- Foothill Transit: 187, 686 (service to events at Rose Bowl stadium)
- LADOT Commuter Express: 549
- Los Angeles Metro Bus: 180, 260, 267, 501 (NoHo-Pasadena Express), 660
- Pasadena Transit: 20, 33, 40, 51, 52, 53

== Future ==
This station will connect with the North Hollywood to Pasadena Bus Rapid Transit Project, a new bus rapid transit line in the Metro Busway network. As of 2024, BRT service is scheduled to begin in late 2027.

== Notable places nearby ==
The station is within walking distance of the following notable places:

- Armory Center for the Arts
- Fuller Theological Seminary
- Gamble House
- Memorial Park & Levitt Pavilion
- Norton Simon Museum
- Old Pasadena
- USC Pacific Asia Museum
- Pasadena City Hall
- Pasadena Civic Center District
- Pasadena Museum of History
- Pasadena Playhouse
- The Paseo
