= Glendale Beeline =

- Parent: City of Glendale
- Founded: 1984
- Headquarters: Municipal Services Building, 613 East Broadway, Glendale, California
- Locale: Glendale
- Service area: Glendale, Burbank, La Cañada Flintridge, and Unincorporated Los Angeles County
- Service type: Bus service, paratransit
- Routes: 12
- Hubs: Glendale Transit Center, Downtown Burbank station, Jet Propulsion Laboratory
- Fuel type: CNG, battery electric
- Operator: MV Transportation
- Website: http://www.glendalebeeline.com

Glendale Beeline is the municipal bus and paratransit service which serves the city of Glendale, California, United States. It provides service in Glendale, as well as parts of nearby Burbank, La Cañada Flintridge and La Crescenta-Montrose. The system functions primarily as a community circulator that complements the regional transit services provided by the Los Angeles County Metropolitan Transportation Authority (Metro).

== History ==
=== Early history ===
Following National City Lines' sale of its Glendale operations to Los Angeles Metropolitan Transit Authority in 1962, Glendale lacked a municipal bus system. To remedy this, the Glendale Beeline, operated by Pacific Busing, was launched in December 1984 as a shuttle bus system for downtown Glendale. Fares were 25 cents for general riders and 15 cents for the elderly and disabled. In 1985, a transfer agreement was reached with Southern California Rapid Transit District.

In 1989, the City of Glendale purchased the Glendale Southern Pacific Railroad Depot, and soon thereafter began acquiring surrounding properties with the intent of creating a transportation center to be used by Beeline.

After Pacific Busing was acquired by Laidlaw in 1989, it did not renew its contract to operate the Beeline. A new contract was awarded in 1990 to Medi-Ride, which already operated Glendale's "Dial-A-Ride" paratransit service.

After pausing fare collection in 1990, fares was reintroduced in 1993. The reintroduction of fares allowed Beeline to expand beyond downtown Glendale, adding service to Adventist Health Glendale, Glendale Community College and La Crescenta-Montrose. Restarting fare collection also enabled the city to upgrade its shuttle buses to full-size busses.

Following several safety incidents during Medi-Ride's operation of the Beeline, the Glendale City Council awarded a new, 3-year contract to Mayflower Contract Services in 1993.

With the 1992 introduction of Metrolink commuter rail, Beeline service was expanded to the Glendale Transportation Center. Following the 1994 Northridge Earthquake, Metrolink rapidly accelerated its expansion of its Santa Clarita line to the Antelope Valley, resulting in an increase in Beeline use.

=== Modern history ===
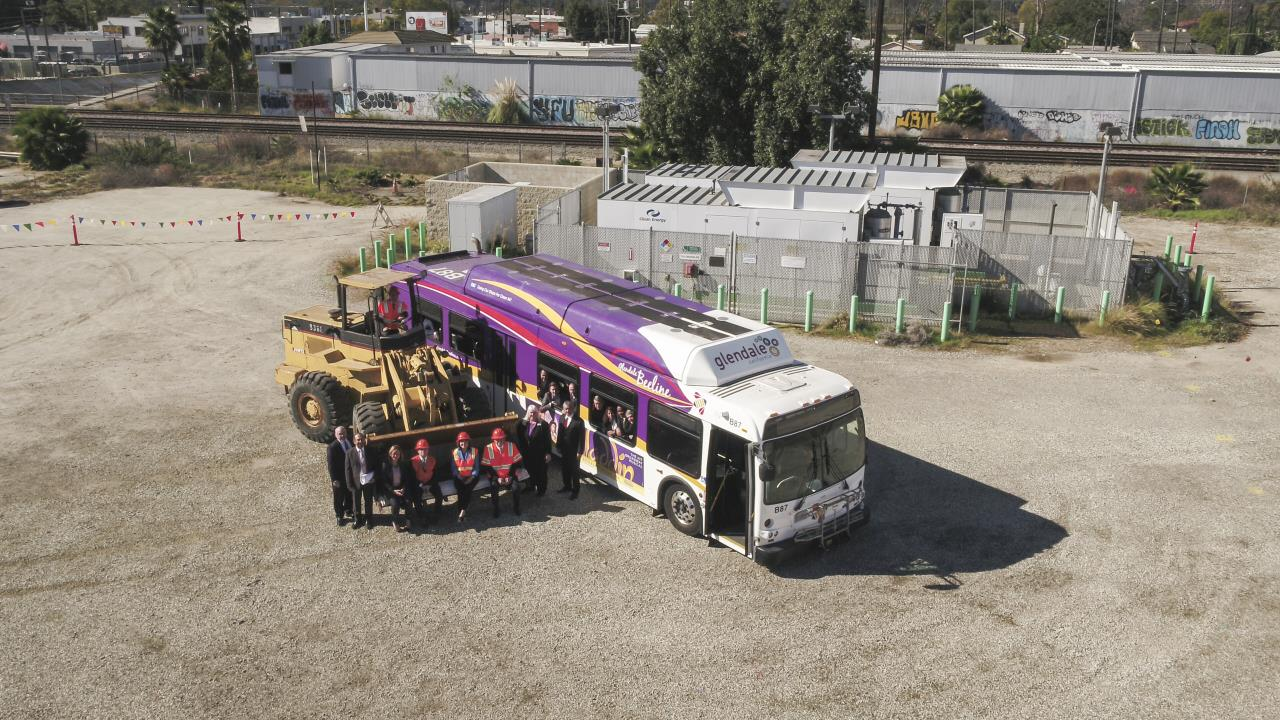
Glendale Beeline maintenance facility groundbreaking in 2018.

In 1999, the Glendale Transportation Center's adjoining bus station opened, thereby becoming an intermodal passenger transport center. On the 9.5-acre area surrounding the train station, a 750-space parking lot was built, landscaping and lighting was improved, and a bay for 10 buses was established.

Following Laidlaw's 2001 bankruptcy, the contract to operate the Beeline system was awarded to MV Transportation.

In 2009, a compressed natural gas filling station opened at the Glendale Transportation Center.

In December 2013, Glendale Beeline became the first public transit agency in Los Angeles County to operate with all low-floor buses.

By 2016, Beeline had outgrown its existing maintenance facility, leading to the construction of an administration, maintenance and operations facility adjacent to the Glendale Transportation Center. Construction began in 2018. The RNL Architecture-designed facility provides dedicated parking for the transit fleet of 37 buses and 9 "dial-a-ride" vans, as well as staff vehicles.

By 2020, Glendale Beeline was facing criticism from environmentalists for relying on compressed natural gas vehicles instead of converting its fleet to electric buses. In 2022, Glendale was awarded $34.6 million in Transit and Intercity Rail Capital Program (TIRCP) funding from the California State Transportation Agency to electrify its bus fleet. The first electric Beeline bus debuted on Earth Day in 2025, with an additional twenty buses to be phased into the fleet over the following three years.

The City has approved funding for service changes ahead of the North Hollywood to Pasadena Bus Rapid Transit Project, including additional midday and evening service.

== Fares and fare collection ==
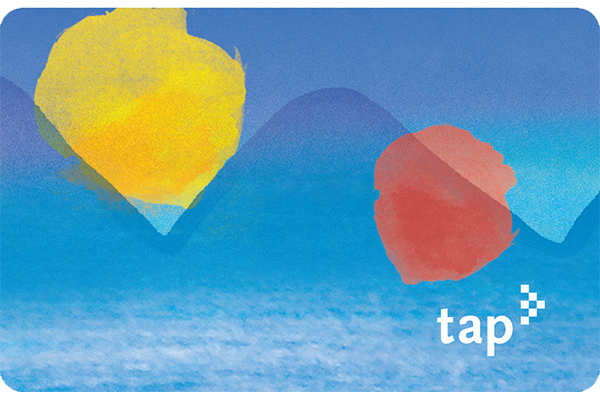
TAP card used for fare payment.

The base fare for Beeline servicesis $1.00 for local buses and $2.00 for express buses. Discounted or free fares are available for seniors, disabled individuals, low-income individuals, and students.

Since 2008, fares can be paid with the TAP card, a contactless stored-value card. TAP cards are valid on Beeline buses and on 26 other transit agencies in Los Angeles County. Fare can also be paid with a contactless bank card and mobile wallet. Single-ride bus fares can still be paid in cash.

The City of La Cañada Flintridge pays the fare for passengers who board LCF Shuttle routes 33 and 34, and for passengers who board Glendale Beeline route 3 in La Cañada Flintridge only.

=== Transit passes ===
==== EZ Transit Pass ====
Passengers who use multiple transit agencies on a regular basis are encouraged to purchase a monthly EZ transit pass or a senior/disabled EZ transit pass. The EZ pass is a monthly pass valid for local travel on 27 public transit carriers throughout Los Angeles County.

==== GoPass ====
In collaboration with Los Angeles Metro and Glendale Community College, Beeline participates in the GoPass program, allowing K-12 and community college students at participating schools to ride the system for free. Students are also able to ride on other participating transport agencies across the county for free, including the Metro's bus and rail services.

==== Low-Income Fare is Easy (LIFE) ====
Low-income riders can use the Low-Income Fare is Easy (LIFE) Program for 20 free rides per month.

=== Fares ===
Fare type	Regular	Senior (62+) Disabled Medicare	Student (without GoPass)	Student (with GoPass)	Notes
Base fare	$1.00	$0.50	$1.00	Free	
Express Routes	$2.00	$2.00	$2.00	Free	
Beeline Transfer	$0.25	$0.15	$0.25	Free	Available with TAP card/Bank card only.
Inter-Agency Transfer	$0.50	$0.25	$0.50	Free	Available with TAP card/Bank card only.

== Routes ==
=== Local routes ===
Route	Terminals		Via	Major connections and notes
1	Glendale; Glendale Transportation Center	Glendale; Central Av & Stocker St	Central Av	Amtrak: Pacific Surfliner; Metrolink: Antelope Valley Ventura County; Amtrak Thruway; Greyhound Lines; Future connection to North Hollywood to Pasadena Bus Rapid Transit Project; Major attractions: The Americana at Brand, Glendale Memorial Hospital and Health Center, Glendale Galleria
3	Downtown Glendale; Harvard St & Louise St	La Cañada Flintridge; Jet Propulsion Laboratory	Glendale Av, Verdugo Rd, Honolulu Av, La Crescenta Av, Foothill Bl	Future connection to North Hollywood to Pasadena Bus Rapid Transit Project; Major attractions: The Americana at Brand, Crescenta Valley High School, Glendale Civic Center, Glendale Community College - Verdugo Campus, Glendale Galleria, Incarnation Catholic Church and School, St. Gregory the Illuminator Cathedral, Museum of Neon Art
31	Downtown Glendale; Harvard St & Louise St	La Crescenta-Montrose; La Crescenta Av & Montrose Av	Glendale Av, Verdugo Rd, Honolulu Av, La Crescenta Av, Foothill Bl	Future connection to North Hollywood to Pasadena Bus Rapid Transit Project; Major attractions: The Americana at Brand, Crescenta Valley High School, Glendale Civic Center, Glendale Community College - Verdugo Campus, Glendale Galleria, Incarnation Catholic Church and School, St. Gregory the Illuminator Cathedral, Museum of Neon Art
4	Glendale; Glendale Transportation Center	Downtown Glendale; Glendale Galleria	Chevy Chase Dr, Broadway, Harvard St	Amtrak: Pacific Surfliner Metrolink: Antelope Valley Ventura County; Amtrak Thruway; Greyhound Lines; Future connection to North Hollywood to Pasadena Bus Rapid Transit Project; Major attractions: The Americana at Brand, Glendale Galleria, Glendale Civic Center, Glendale Community College - Garfield Campus, Glendale Memorial Hospital and Health Center, Museum of Neon Art
5	Glendale; Pacific Av & Riverdale Dr	Glendale; Herbert Hoover High School	Pacific Av	Metro: 501; Future connection to North Hollywood to Pasadena Bus Rapid Transit Project Major attractions: Herbert Hoover High School
6	Glendale; Pacific Av & Riverdale Dr	Glendale; Glendale High School	Colorado St	LADOT Commuter Express: 409; Future connection to North Hollywood to Pasadena Bus Rapid Transit Project Major attractions: The Americana at Brand, Glendale Galleria, Glendale High School, Holy Family Catholic Church, Museum of Neon Art
7	Glendale; Victory Bl & Western Av	Glendale; Glendale Community College	Glenoaks Bl, Stocker St, Glendale Av	Future connection to North Hollywood to Pasadena Bus Rapid Transit Project; Major attractions: Glendale Community College - Verdugo Campus, Grand View Memorial Park Cemetery, Herbert Hoover High School, Incarnation Catholic Church and School
8	Glendale; Glendale Transportation Center	Glendale; Glendale Community College	Glendale Ave, San Fernando Rd	Amtrak: Pacific Surfliner Metrolink: Antelope Valley Ventura County; Amtrak Thruway; Greyhound Lines; Future connection to North Hollywood to Pasadena Bus Rapid Transit Project; Major attractions: Forest Lawn Memorial Park, Glendale Civic Center, Glendale Community College - Verdugo Campus

=== Express routes ===
Metrolink Express is an express bus service, consisting of 2 routes, serving the Metrolink station at Glendale Transportation Center during rush hour only.

Services operate weekdays only.

Route	Terminals		Via	Major connections and notes
11	Glendale; Glendale Transportation Center	Downtown Glendale; Monterey Rd & Brand Bl	Brand Bl	Amtrak: Pacific Surfliner Metrolink: Antelope Valley Ventura County; Amtrak Thruway; Greyhound Lines; Metro: 501; Future connection to North Hollywood to Pasadena Bus Rapid Transit Project; Major attractions: Alex Theatre, The Americana at Brand, Glendale Memorial Hospital and Health Center, Museum of Neon Art, ServiceTitan
12	Glendale; Glendale Transportation Center	Burbank; Burbank Station	San Fernando Rd, Flower St	Amtrak: Pacific Surfliner Metrolink: Antelope Valley Ventura County; Amtrak Thruway; Greyhound Lines; Future connection to North Hollywood to Pasadena Bus Rapid Transit Project; Major attractions: DreamWorks Animation, Grand Central Creative Campus

=== La Cañada Flintridge (LCF) Shuttle routes ===
LCF Shuttle, consisting of 2 routes, serves the city of La Cañada Flintridge.

Services operate weekdays only.

Route	Terminals		Via	Major connections and notes
33	La Crescenta-Montrose; Montrose Av & Waltonia Dr	La Cañada Flintridge; Jet Propulsion Laboratory	Ocean View Bl, Foothill Bl	Major attractions: Flintridge Preparatory School
34	La Crescenta-Montrose; Montrose Av & Waltonia Dr	La Cañada Flintridge; La Cañada High School	Ocean View Bl, Foothill Bl	Major attractions: Flintridge Preparatory School

== Bus fleet ==
=== Beeline fleet ===
Make/Model	Fleet numbers	Thumbnail	Year	Notes
New Flyer XN35	B01-B05		2020	
New Flyer XE35	B06-B10		2025	First electric buses for Glendale Beeline
New Flyer C40LF	B58-B59		2005	
New Flyer C35LFR	B66-B72		2009	
New Flyer C40LFR	B73-B74		2009	
New Flyer C40LFR	B75-B78		2012	
New Flyer C40LFR	B79-B88		2013	
New Flyer XN40	B89-B97	A New Flyer XN40 Glendale Beeline Line 7 Bus (#B96)	2016	
Gillig BRT Plus CNG 40'	B98-B99		2019	

=== La Cañada Flintridge (LCF) Shuttle fleet ===
Make/Model	Fleet numbers	Thumbnail	Year	Notes
New Flyer C35LFR	LC2		2009	
New Flyer C35LF	LC3-LC4		2001	
New Flyer XN35	LC5		2016	

== See also ==
- Burbank Bus
- Los Angeles Metro Bus
