= North Hollywood to Pasadena Bus Rapid Transit Project =

Proposed bus rapid transit line in Los Angeles County, California

Overview
- Status: Under construction
- Termini: North Hollywood; Colorado/Hill
- Stations: 22
- Website: www.metro.net/projects/noho-pasadena-corridor/

Service
- Type: Bus rapid transit
- System: Los Angeles Metro Busway
- Operator: Los Angeles Metro

History
- Planned opening: 2028; 2 years' time

The North Hollywood to Pasadena Bus Rapid Transit Project (formerly the North Hollywood to Pasadena Transit Corridor) is an under-construction 18-mile (29 km) bus rapid transit line in Los Angeles County, California. It is planned to operate between the North Hollywood station and Pasadena.

It will be the third line in the Los Angeles Metro Busway system, along with the G Line and the J Line.

Construction began in Pasadena in April 2026, with corridor-wide construction set for summer 2026. Construction is scheduled for completion by the end of 2027, with the line open for revenue service ahead of the 2028 Summer Olympics.

== Service Description ==
=== Route description ===
The route will run between North Hollywood and Pasadena, serving 22 stations.

The line's western terminus is North Hollywood station, shared with the B Line and G Line. The line briefly runs east before heading south to the Vineland/Hesby station. It then heads east on State Route 134 to the Olive/Riverside and Alameda/Naomi stations in the Burbank Media District. It next heads northeast along Olive Avenue toward downtown Burbank, stopping at Olive/Verdugo, Olive/Lake and Olive/San Fernando.

East of downtown Burbank, the route heads southeast on Glenoaks Boulevard, stopping at Glenoaks/Alameda on the Burbank-Glendale border before continuing to Glenoaks/Western, Glenoaks/Grandview and Glenoaks/Pacific. It then crosses over the Verdugo Wash and State Route 134 as it heads south on Central Avenue, stopping at Central/Lexington before turning east on Broadway. The route then stops at Broadway/Brand, Broadway/Glendale and Broadway/Verdugo before heading into Eagle Rock.

Traveling east on Colorado Boulevard, the route has stations at Eagle Rock Plaza, Colorado/Eagle Rock and Colorado/Townsend. The route then heads east again on State Route 134, exiting at Fair Oaks Avenue and heading toward Memorial Park station, shared with the A Line. It finally heads east on Colorado Boulevard, stopping at Colorado/Los Robles, Colorado/Lake and Colorado/Hill, adjacent to Pasadena City College.

=== Schedule and frequency ===
The line's proposed schedule is 4 A.M.-1 A.M. Monday-Thursday, 4 A.M.-3 A.M. Friday-Saturday, and 4 A.M.-1 A.M. Sunday.

Time	4–6 A.M.	6–9 A.M.	9 A.M.-3 P.M.	3-7 P.M.	7-9 P.M.	9 P.M.-12 A.M.	Owl
Weekday	20 min.	10 min.			15 min.	20 min.	20 min.
Weekend/Holiday	30 min.	15 min.				30 min.	30 min.

=== Station list ===
The following table lists the stations of the line, from west to east.

Stations	Date Opening	City/Neighborhood	Major connections and notes
North Hollywood	2028	Los Angeles (North Hollywood)	LA Metro: Bicycle: Metro Bike Share, Chandler Boulevard Bike Path (east), G Line Bikeway (west); Park and ride: 1,085 spaces Major attractions: Academy of Television Arts & Sciences, El Portal Theater
Vineland Av/Hesby St	2028	Los Angeles (North Hollywood)	Major attractions: NoHo Arts District
Olive Av/Hollywood Wy	2028	Burbank	Major attractions: Disney XD, New York Film Academy, Warner Bros. Studios, Warner Bros. Ranch Studios
Alameda Av/Buena Vista St	2028	Burbank	Major attractions: The Burbank Studios, Fremantle, iHeartMedia, KCET, Legendary Entertainment, Providence High School, Providence Saint Joseph Medical Center, The Walt Disney Studios
Olive Av/Verdugo Av	2028	Burbank	Major attractions: John Burroughs High School
Olive Av/Lake St	2028	Burbank	Amtrak: Pacific Surfliner; Metrolink: Antelope Valley Ventura County Park and ride: 458 spaces Bicycle: Burbank Channel Bikeway; Major attractions: Nickelodeon Animation Studio
Olive Av/San Fernando Bl	2028	Burbank	Major attractions: Burbank City Hall, Burbank Courthouse, Burbank High School, Burbank Town Center
Glenoaks Bl/Alameda Av	2028	Burbank (south); Glendale (north)	
Glenoaks Bl/Western Av	2028	Glendale	
Glenoaks Bl/Grandview Av	2028	Glendale	Major attractions: DreamWorks Animation, Grand Central Creative Campus, KABC-TV
Glenoaks Bl/Pacific Av	2028	Glendale	Major attractions: Casa Adobe de San Rafael, Herbert Hoover High School
Central Av/Lexington Dr	2028	Glendale	Major attractions: Consulate General of Armenia in Los Angeles, Consulate General of the Dominican Republic in Los Angeles
Broadway/Brand Bl	2028	Glendale	Major attractions: Alex Theatre, Americana at Brand, Armenian American Museum, Glendale Galleria, Martial Arts History Museum, Museum of Neon Art
Broadway/Glendale Av	2028	Glendale	Major attractions: Consulate General of Honduras in Los Angeles, Glendale City Hall, Glendale Courthouse
Broadway/Verdugo Rd	2028	Glendale	Major attractions: Glendale High School
Colorado Bl/Sierra Villa Dr (eastbound) / Colorado Bl/Lockhaven Av (westbound)	2028	Los Angeles (Eagle Rock)	
Colorado Bl/Caspar Av	2028	Los Angeles (Eagle Rock)	Major attractions: Center for the Arts Eagle Rock, Vidiots
Colorado Bl/Mt. Royal Av	2028	Los Angeles (Eagle Rock)	
'Holly St/Arroyo Pw'	2028	Pasadena	LA Metro: Major attractions: Old Pasadena
Colorado Bl/Los Robles Av	2028	Pasadena	Major attractions: Fuller Theological Seminary, Pasadena City Hall, The Paseo, USC Pacific Asia Museum
Colorado Bl/Lake Av	2028	Pasadena	Major attractions: Pasadena Playhouse
Hill Av/Green St (Pasadena City College)	2028	Pasadena	Major attractions: California Institute of Technology, Pasadena City College

== History ==
=== Planning ===
==== Early concepts ====
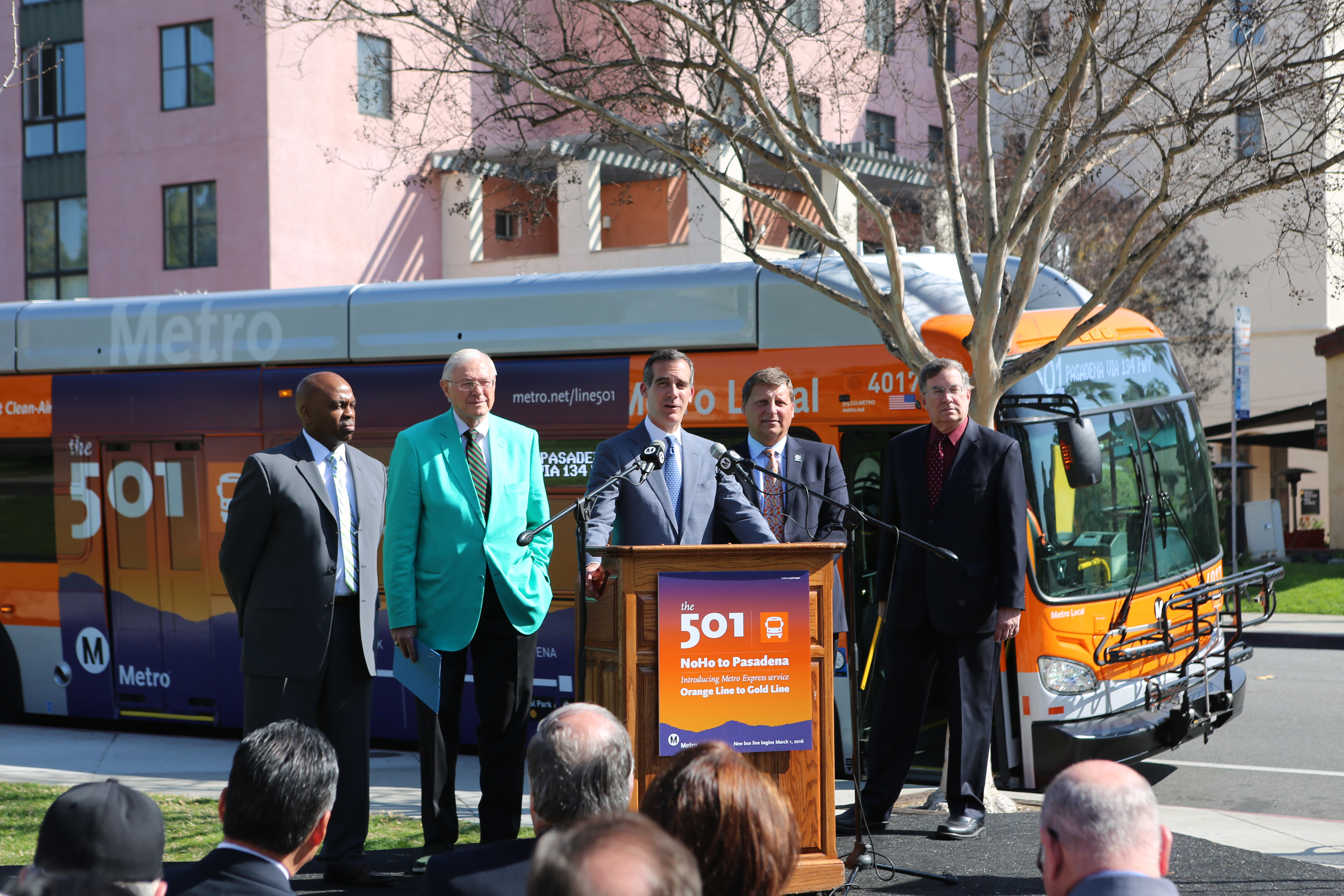
Los Angeles Mayor Eric Garcetti announcing the launch of Metro route 501 in 2016.

The North Hollywood–Pasadena corridor was identified by Metro as a potential bus rapid transit route in its 2013 Los Angeles County Bus Rapid Transit and Street Design Improvement Study, which noted that the "corridor also has strong support from the affected cities of Pasadena, Glendale, Burbank, and the Burbank Bob Hope Airport." The report called for a detailed corridor study for the route, which was anticipated to require approximately 18 to 24 months to complete. Metro also suggested that the Los Angeles Department of Transportation (LADOT) consider modifying their existing peak‐hour Commuter Express route 549 — which operates between Encino and Pasadena, mostly along State Route 134 — to a more frequent, all-day service while the detailed corridor study is conducted.

In March 2016, Metro launched its own express route, between North Hollywood station and Del Mar station in Pasadena: route 501, marketed as "NoHo-Pasadena Express." Metro boardmember and Glendale councilmember Ara Najarian suggested that if the line proved successful, "it could provide the justification we need to consider even greater transit investments in this corridor."

==== Studies and funding ====
On the November 2016 ballot, Metro proposed a $120 billion plan to expand upon 2008 Los Angeles County Measure R, adding new transit projects and expediting others previously approved under Measure R. Measure M, named the "Los Angeles County Traffic Improvement Plan," would make Measure R permanent and add an additional half-cent sales tax. The referendum included dedicated funding for a North Hollywood–Pasadena bus rapid transit project, with funding for a conversion to rail available beginning in 2067. Measure M passed with 70.15% of the vote, clearing the two-thirds majority required. At the time, Metro noted that "[t]he project could be converted to a rail service at a later date if ridership demand outgrows the bus rapid service capacity."

The North Hollywood to Pasadena BRT Corridor Technical Study, completed in March 2017, explored the feasibility and performance of implementing bus rapid transit, including dedicated bus lanes, enhanced stations, all-door boarding, and transit signal priority. It also identified two initial BRT concepts ("Primary Street" and "Primary Freeway"), including multiple route options.

In January 2018, Metro incorporated the project into the "Twenty-eight by '28" plan to complete 28 major road, transit and bicycle projects before the 2028 Summer Olympics and 2028 Summer Paralympics. That April, the project received state transit capital grant funds from California State Transportation Agency's (CalSTA) Transit and Intercity Rail Capital Program (TIRCP), funded by the Road Repair and Accountability Act (California Senate Bill 1). The North Hollywood to Pasadena BRT Corridor Planning and Environmental Study was initiated in August 2018 to further study the project, and included extensive public outreach efforts.

By 2019, the planning process had become contentious, with anti-BRT activists in Eagle Rock seeking to route the line along State Route 134 instead of Colorado Boulevard.

==== Environmental review process ====
In November 2020, Metro released the project's Draft Environmental Impact Report (DEIR). Metro noted that charging infrastructure for battery electric busses would be available at the North Hollywood Station and Pasadena City College termini, as well as at its Division 9 bus depot in El Monte, where busses would be stored. The construction of the proposed project was expected to last approximately 24 to 30 months.

In response to the DEIR, a pro-BRT activist group named Eagle Rock Forward created a proposal, entitled "Beautiful Boulevard," to improve walkability along the Eagle Rock segment of the planned route.

In April 2022, Metro approved the Final Environmental Impact Report (FEIR) for the line. Key revisions from the DEIR include the relocation of a proposed station on the Olive Avenue bridge in Burbank. A July 2022 lawsuit alleged that the meeting where the FEIR was approved allegedly violated California's Brown Act. The lawsuit failed in December 2023.

In August 2022, the United States Department of Transportation awarded a $104 million grant to Metro for the purchase and deployment of 160 battery electric buses as well as for the procurement and installation of enroute and depot charging stations, including at Division 9.

In December 2024, the Metro Board of Directors approved moving into the construction phase of the project. Metro awarded the contract for the pre-construction services phase to Myers-Shimmick, a joint venture between Myers & Sons Construction and Shimmick Construction Company.

=== Construction ===
At a May 2025 presentation to the Glendale City Council, Metro stated that construction on the line would begin as soon as June 2025. In September 2025, Metro began locating and identifying underground utilities along the route.

Despite NIMBY opposition to the Abundant and Affordable Homes Near Transit Act (California Senate Bill 79), which preempts local government control of land zoning within one half-mile of certain public transportation stations, Metro is moving forward with the project, and will "closely coordinate with the cities of Los Angeles, Burbank, Glendale and Pasadena" as it finalizes the design "in accordance with the Metro Board approved project."

Construction began in Pasadena in April 2026, with corridor-wide construction set for summer 2026. Revenue service is planned to begin ahead of the 2028 Summer Olympics.

In May 2026, Metro filed a petition for a writ of mandate in the Los Angeles County Superior Court, asking the court to order the City of Burbank to permit planned bus lanes on Olive Avenue. Metro argues that, under the California Environmental Quality Act and an agreement between Metro and the City, the City does not have the authority to refuse construction permits. At ceremonial groundbreaking ceremony, Metro boardmember Ara Najarian stated that "This is what the voters of LA County asked for and Metro respects those votes, those wishes and desires and financial sacrifices that the people of LA County demanded. Metro will not shirk or ignore that responsibility" While the issue is litigated, the parties have agreed to proceed with construction in Burbank outside the disputed segment.

Construction of the Pasadena segment is scheduled for completion in November 2026.

Construction of the Glendale segment is scheduled to start in November 2026.

== Operations ==
=== Maintenance ===
The line will operate out of Metro's Division 9 bus depot in El Monte.

=== Fleet ===
Despite testing an Ebusco electric bus, Metro ultimately awarded a contract to bus manufacturer ENC for 220 electric busses. The buses will be assigned primarily to Divisions 9 (El Monte) and 18 (Carson) for use on the North Hollywood to Pasadena Bus Rapid Transit Project and on local routes.

== Proposed developments ==
=== Conversion to rail ===
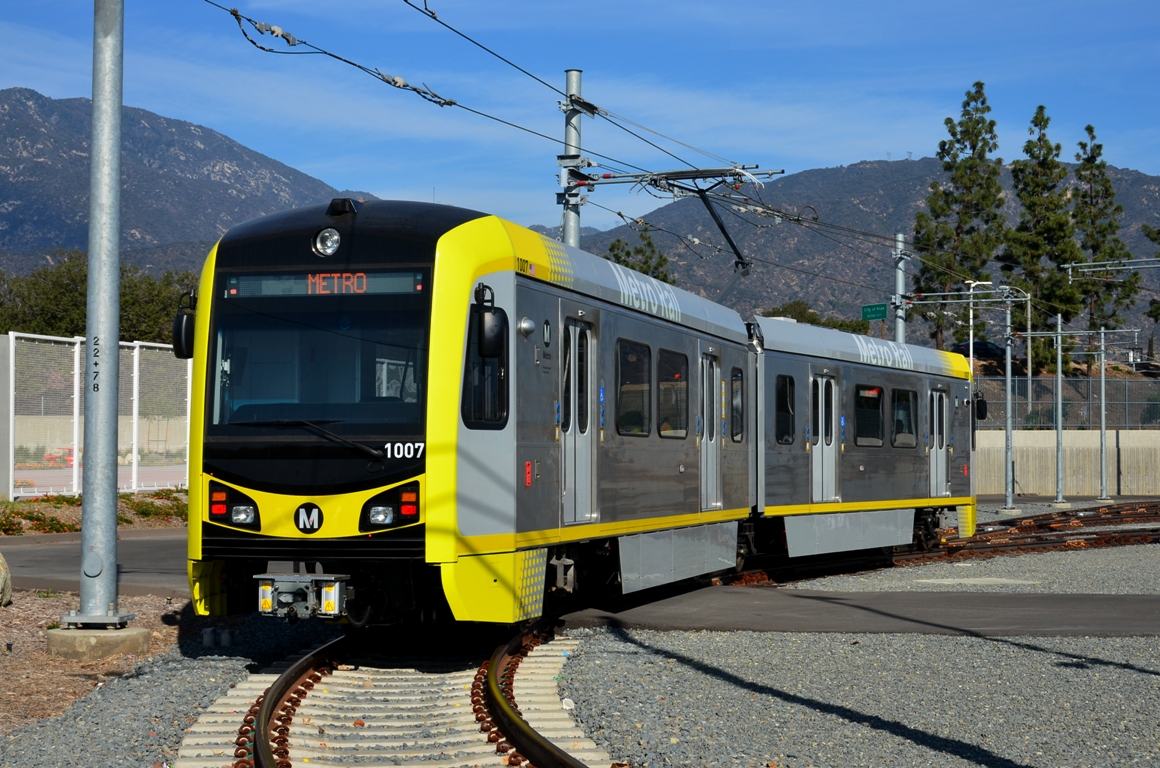
Metro light rail

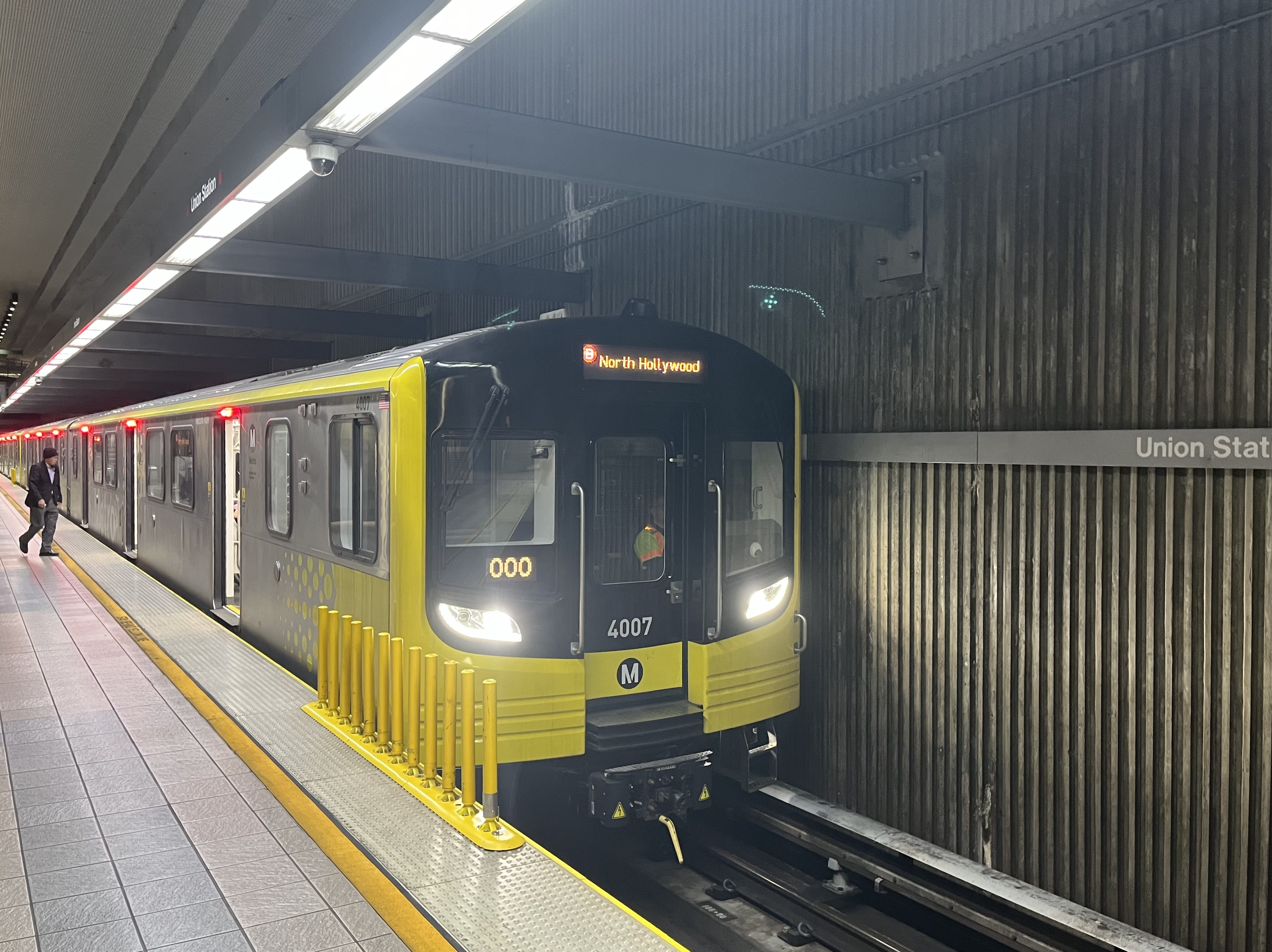
Metro heavy rail

In 2016, Metro noted that "[t]he project could be converted to a rail service at a later date if ridership demand outgrows the bus rapid service capacity." Measure M, a referendum passed later that year, allows funding for rail conversion of the line beginning in 2067.

In 2021, California State Assembly member Chris Holden secured $1 million for the California State Transportation Agency (CalSTA) for a study of an L Line extension to the Hollywood Burbank Airport.

In 2024, Metro released a report on possible light rail or heavy rail conversion of the line. A feasibility study has been requested to study the following routes:

1. New Rail Alternative: The route would travel east from North Hollywood station at-grade along Chandler Boulevard — with an optional Hollywood Burbank Airport connection — then possibly interlining with Metrolink and travelling along the Verdugo Wash, before being routed along the median of State Route 134 to Pasadena, where it would end in an underground connection with the Metro A Line.
2. BRT Conversion Alternative: The route would mostly travel at-grade along the BRT route, likely tunneling below downtown Burbank and downtown Glendale.
