= List of buildings in Pasadena, California =

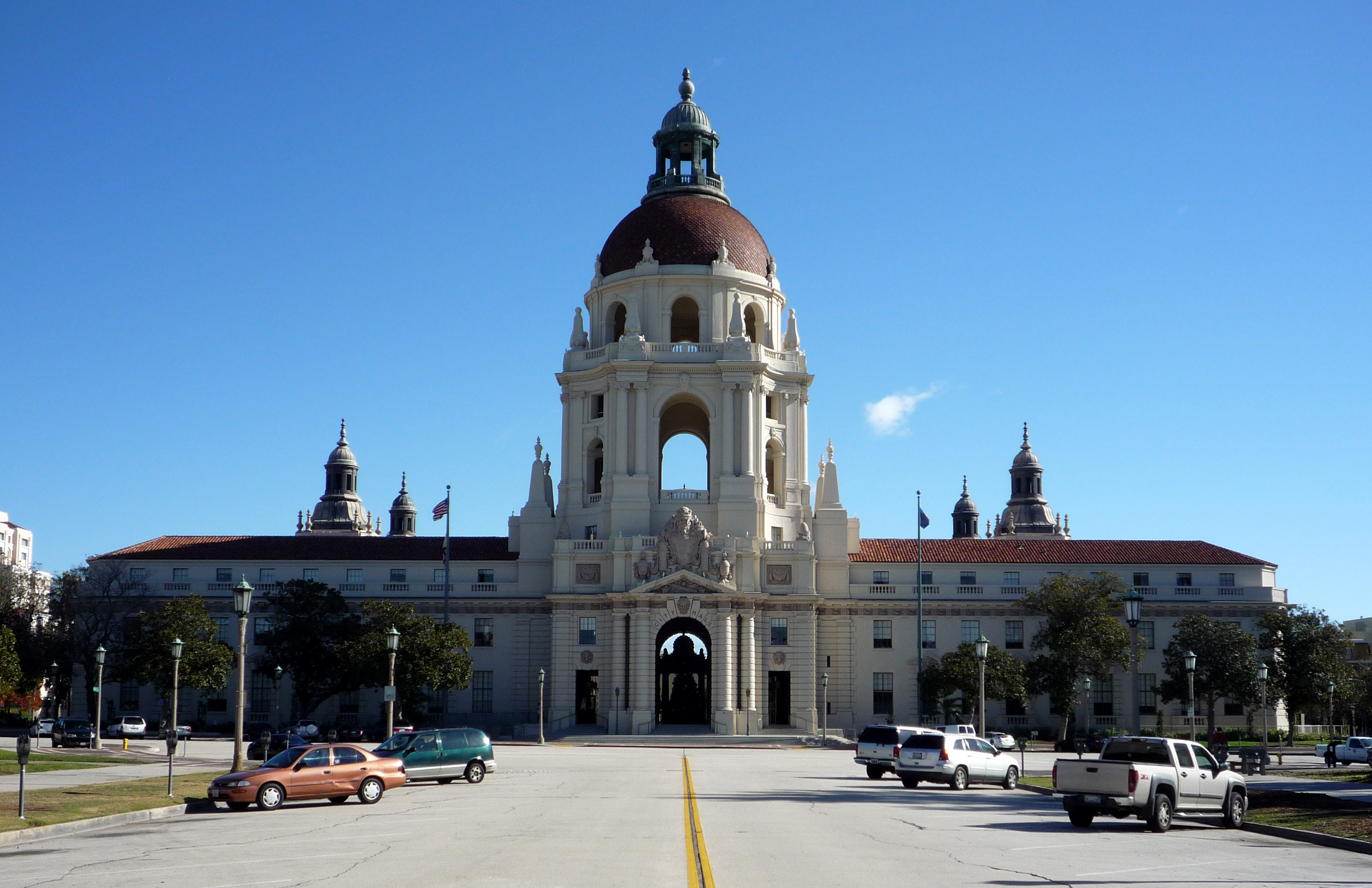
Pasadena City Hall, currently the tallest building in Pasadena.

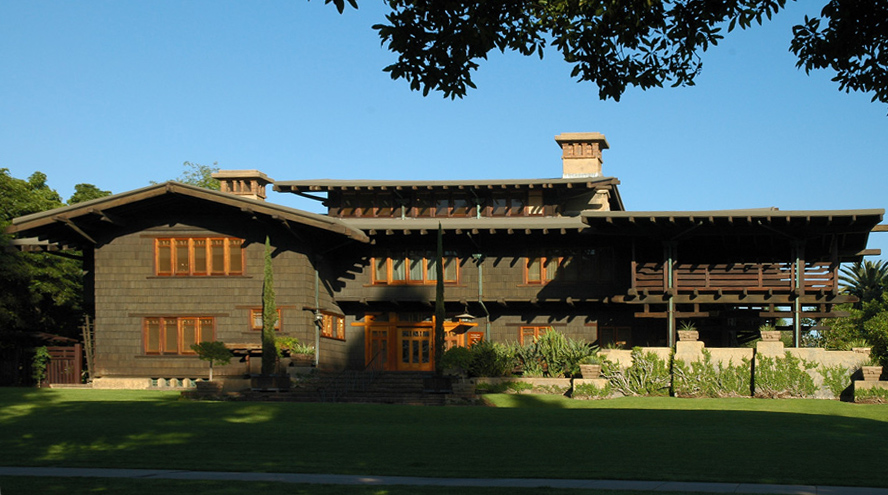
Gamble House

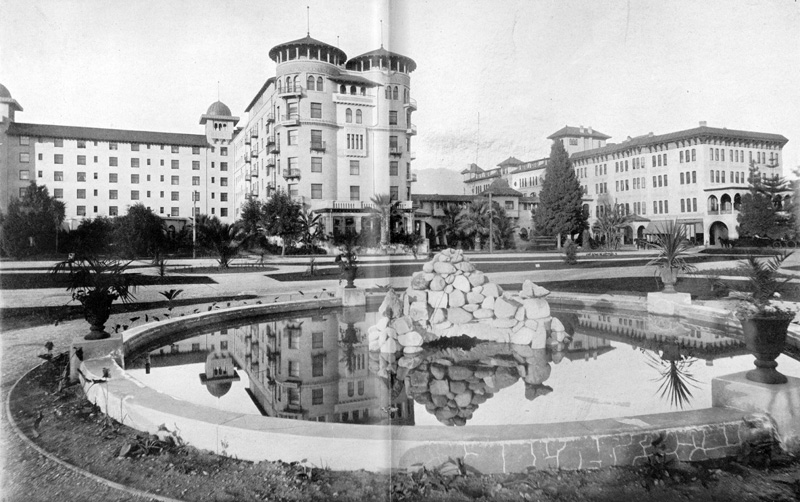
Hotel Green

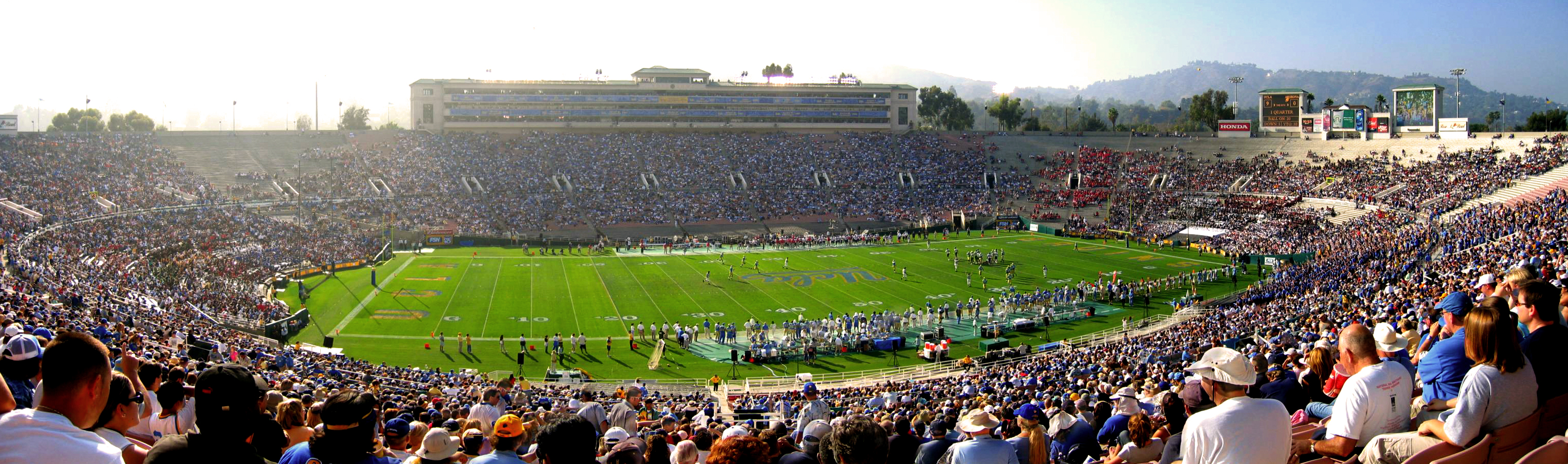
Rose Bowl

This is a list of the tallest and largest buildings in Pasadena, California.

== Tallest buildings ==
Rank	Building Name	Height	Floors	Year built
1	Pasadena City Hall	206 ft (63 m)	6	1927
2	Parsons Corporate Headquarters	200 ft (61 m)	12	1971
3	AT&T Building	197 ft (60 m)	12	1970
4	Concord Pasadena	193 ft (59 m)	14	–
5	Gateway Plaza	180 ft (55 m)	13	1989
5	225 South Lake (Corporate Center Pasadena)	180 ft (55 m)	14	1981
7	Lake Corson	170 ft (52 m)	14	1989
8	790 East Colorado	160 ft (49 m)	9	1981
9	251 South Lake (Corporate Center Pasadena)	150 ft (46 m)	10	1970
10	Westin Pasadena	147 ft (45 m)	12	1989
11	Gateway Metro Center	145 ft (44 m)	11	–
12	2 North Lake	144 ft (44 m)	11	1985
12	IndyMac Bank Building	144 ft (44 m)	11	1984
12	Millikan Library, Caltech Campus	144 ft (44 m)	9	1967
15	Hilton Pasadena	138 ft (42 m)	13	1971
16	Pasadena Towers	136 ft (41 m)	9	–
17	Pasadena Financial Center	131 ft (40 m)	9	1983
18	201 South Lake (Corporate Center Pasadena)	128 ft (39 m)	8	1972
19	70 South Lake	122 ft (37 m)	11	1982
20	Pacific Southwest Savings Building	120 ft (37 m)	8	1925
21	150 South Los Robles	115 ft (35 m)	9	–
21	87 North Raymond	115 ft (35 m)	9	–
21	199 South Los Robles	115 ft (35 m)	8	1985
24	Parsons Corporate Headquarters West Annex	112 ft (34 m)	8	1971
25	Ameron Center	110 ft (34 m)	8	1978
26	299 North Euclid	80 ft (24 m)	5	1983

== National Register of Historic Places ==
see National Register of Historic Places listings in Pasadena, California.
