= Pasarroyo =

Pasarroyo (formerly Corporate Center Pasadena)
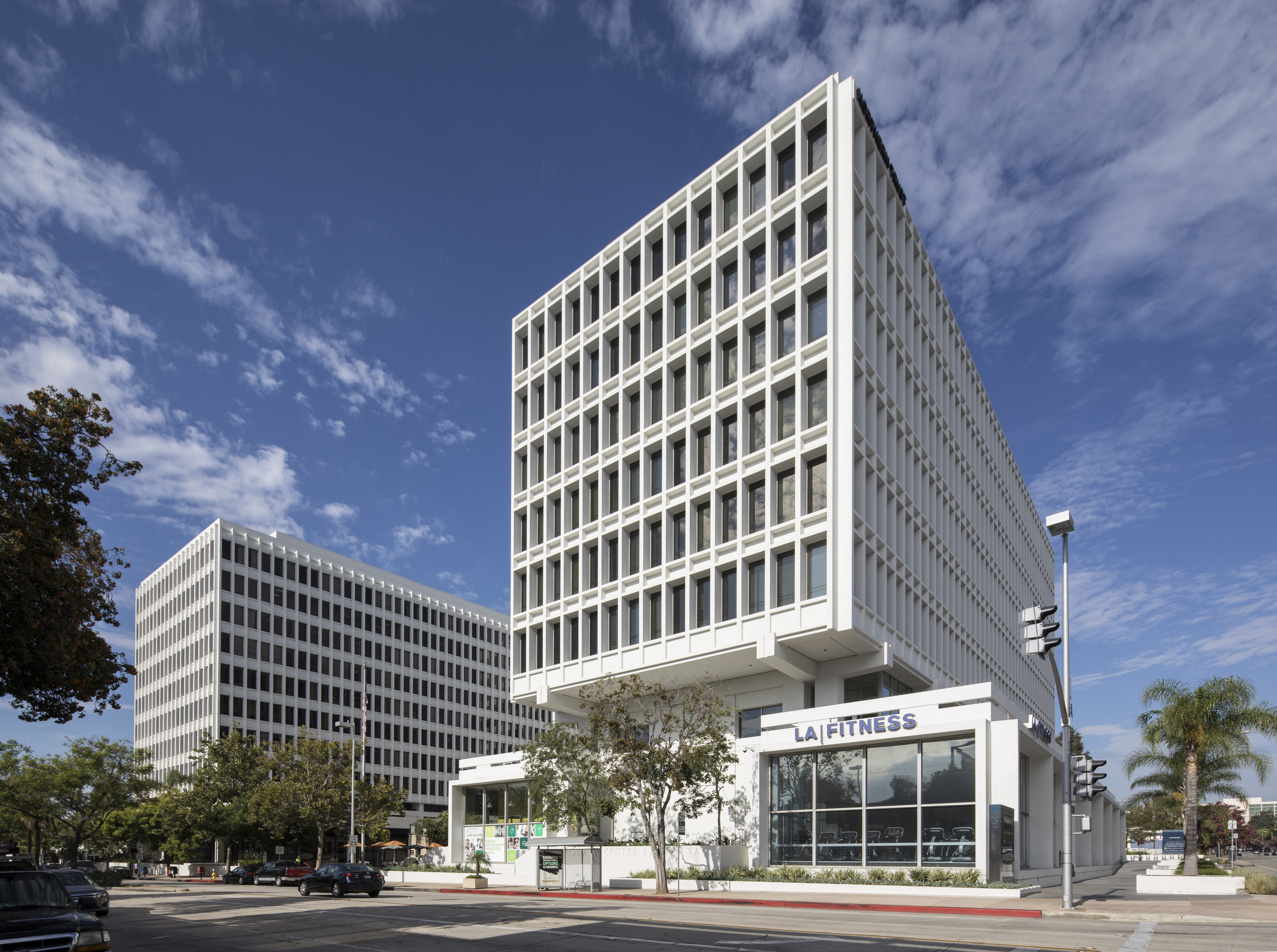
- Interactive map of the Pasarroyo (formerly Corporate Center Pasadena) area

General information
- Type: Commercial offices
- Location: 201, 225, 251 and 283 S. Lake Ave; Pasadena, California
- Coordinates: 34.14140°N 118.13297°W
- Completed: 1981

Height
- Roof: 55 m (180 ft)

Technical details
- Floor count: 14
- Floor area: 59,457.9456 m^{2} (640,000.000 sq ft)

Pasarroyo (formerly Corporate Center Pasadena) is a four-building complex with 640,000 sq ft (92,000,000 sq in) of commercial space. It spans a full city block on S. Lake Avenue in Downtown Pasadena. It is the largest office campus in Pasadena.

== Major tenants ==
- LA Fitness
- Dunkin' Donuts
- Northern Trust
- Urban Plates
- Barrister Executive Suites

== See also ==
- List of buildings in Pasadena, California
