= The Paseo (Pasadena) =

- Location: Pasadena, California, United States
- Coordinates: 34.145162°N 118.144314°W
- Address: 300 E. Colorado Blvd, Pasadena, CA 91101
- Opened: September 2001; 25 years ago
- Owner: Cypress Equities
- Architect: Charles Kober & Associates
- Num. of anchor tenants: 0 (2 at peak)
- Floor area: 553,377 sq ft (51,410.4 m^{2})
- Floors: 2
- Public transit: Los Angeles Metro Memorial Park station 180, 267, 662; Foothill Transit 187; Pasadena Transit 10
- Website: www.thepaseopasadena.com

The Paseo is an outdoor mall in Pasadena, California, covering three city blocks with office space, shops, restaurants, a movie theater, and 400 loft-style condominiums (called Terrace Apartment Homes) above. As of 2014, the mall is without an anchor tenant since both Macy's and Gelson's Markets closed in 2013.

== History ==
=== Plaza Pasadena (1980 – 2001) ===
The site was originally occupied by a shopping mall called Plaza Pasadena, which opened on September 3, 1980 and featured three anchor stores: J.C. Penney, The Broadway, and May Company California. It was built by the Hahn Company at a cost of $115 million on an 11-acre site and had featured over 120 stores. The development was designed by Charles Kober & Associates and the resulting design was awarded a Progressive Architecture Magazine Design Award in 1979.

Despite initially being successful in its early years, redevelopments in Old Pasadena took businesses and attention away from the mall. May Company closed its store there in 1989, and the space was divided among smaller stores.

In 1998, following the conversion of the Broadway store to Macy's two years earlier and the closure of J.C. Penney, the developers announced plans to tear down the mall and replace it with an outdoor center.

=== Paseo Colorado (2001 – 2017) ===
Paseo Colorado opened in September 2001, retaining the Macy's store from the original development and added a supermarket and movie theater complex. Two years later, the outdoor center was sold to Developers Diversified Realty Corp. for $114 million in 2003.

In May 2010, Pacific Paseo 14 was replaced by ArcLight Pasadena. A few months later, the Paseo Colorado saw the opening of Noor, a 16,000 sq ft event space featuring state-of-the-art audio/visual and lighting and seating for up to 350 guests for banquets in its large ballroom, the Sofia, and 140 guests for banquets in its smaller ballroom, the Ella in November 2010.

On January 3, 2013, Macy's announced their store at Paseo Colorado would close in early spring 2013. At the time of the store closure, there were plans to demolish the Macy's building and replace it with a multi-story hotel.

In March 2013, Gelson's announced that they would close their store at Paseo Colorado on July 21, 2013. This store had been at this location since Paseo Colorado first opened 12 years prior. The closing of the supermarket in 2013 meant that, for the first time, the shopping development did not have a major retail anchor. This marked the gradual move away from retail and towards hospitality.

By late 2014, the mall was in the process of obtaining the necessary local governmental licenses to replace the vacant Macy's department store with a Hyatt Place hotel and mixed-use condominium complex. After obtaining the necessary permits, DDR began the demolition process in August 2015.

In January 2016, DDR sold the retail development to Cypress Equities of Dallas.

In 2016, a new dinner theater and event venue known as The Rose opened inside the space formerly occupied by Gelson’s Market. The space was 39,000 square feet (3623.2 m²).

=== The Paseo (2017 – present) ===
The shopping development was renamed The Paseo in 2017. It is located in downtown Pasadena between Colorado Boulevard to the north and Green Street to the south. Paseo Colorado is just east of and connected by a pedestrian bridge, the Garfield Promenade, to Old Town Pasadena, and west of the center of downtown. The mall is located across Green Street from the Pasadena Civic Auditorium in the Pasadena Conference Center. A Hyatt Place opened in December 2018; the site had formerly been occupied by a Macy's.

ArcLight Pasadena was closed in March 2020 as a result of the COVID pandemic. In April 2021, its parent company announced that none of its theaters would reopen. In April 2023, it was announced that Regal Cinemas had acquired the lease to the former Arclight Cinema at the mall and that it would reopen as part of the company's chain. On June 1, 2023, Regal Cinemas opened its doors at the former Arclight Cinemas.
