= Pasadena Civic Center District =

Historic district in California, United States

- U.S. National Register of Historic Places
- U.S. Historic district
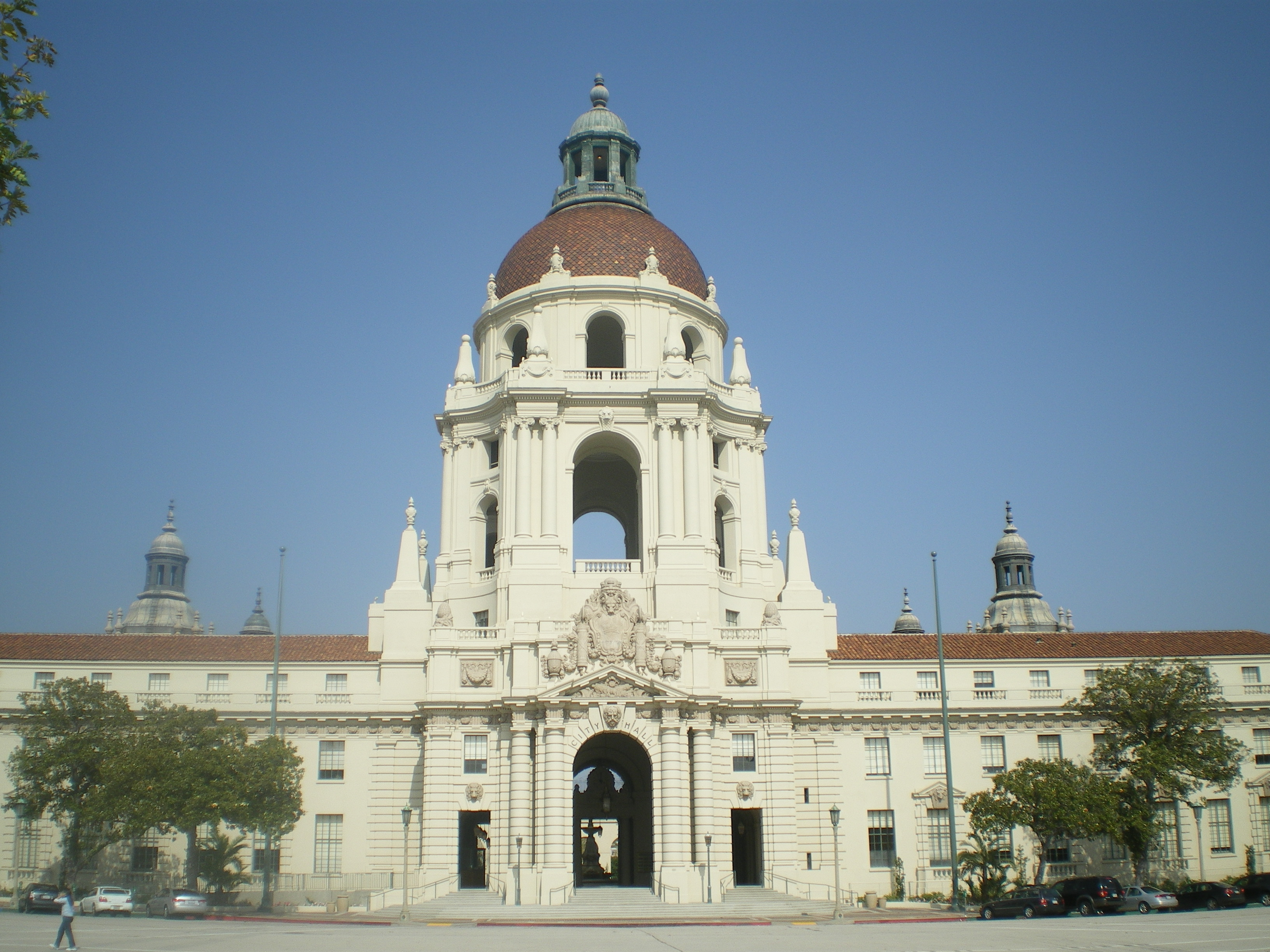
- Pasadena City Hall, 2008

- Location within the Los Angeles metropolitan area Location within California Location within the United States
- Location: Pasadena, California
- Coordinates: 34.14766°N 118.1443°W
- Architectural style: Beaux Arts
- NRHP reference No.: 80000813
- Added to NRHP: July 28, 1980

The Pasadena Civic Center District is the civic center of and a historic district in Pasadena, California, United States. The district is roughly bounded by Walnut and Green Streets and Raymond and Euclid Avenues.

== History ==
Construction on the buildings in the district was funded with a $3.5 million bond issuance in 1923. The plan was created by the Chicago firm of Bennett, Parsons and Frost. The elaborate designs of the buildings in the district were inspired by the City Beautiful movement of the 1920s.

The district was listed in the National Register of Historic Places in 1980.

== Architecture ==
The Pasadena City Hall, Pasadena Central Library, and Pasadena Civic Auditorium serve as the centerpieces of the district.

The Beaux-Arts Mediterranean Revival City Hall building was designed by San Francisco architects Bakewell and Brown in the style of 16th-century Italian architect Andrea Palladio. The building resembles three of Palladio's domed structures—the church of Santa Maria della Salute in Venice, the Hotel des Invalides in Paris and St Paul's Cathedral in London. Without being a direct imitation, Pasadena City Hall is related to them all.

The Pasadena Central Library was designed by Myron Hunt in 1924. The Central Library was dedicated on Lincoln's birthday (February 12), 1927, and was the first building completed of the new Civic Center Plan.

Part of the district prior to the 1920s are: the Pasadena Post Office, Turner and Stevens Company Building, YMCA, and the YWCA designed by Julia Morgan.

After the Civic Center was formally planned, additional buildings were constructed in the area. These buildings include the American Legion Hall, the First Baptist Church, the Southern California Gas Company building, the Hall of Justice, the County Courts, All Saints Episcopal Church), and the Maryland Hotel Apartments.

Memorial Park, the site of Pasadena's first public library, is also part of the district.

== Gallery of images of Pasadena Civic Center ==
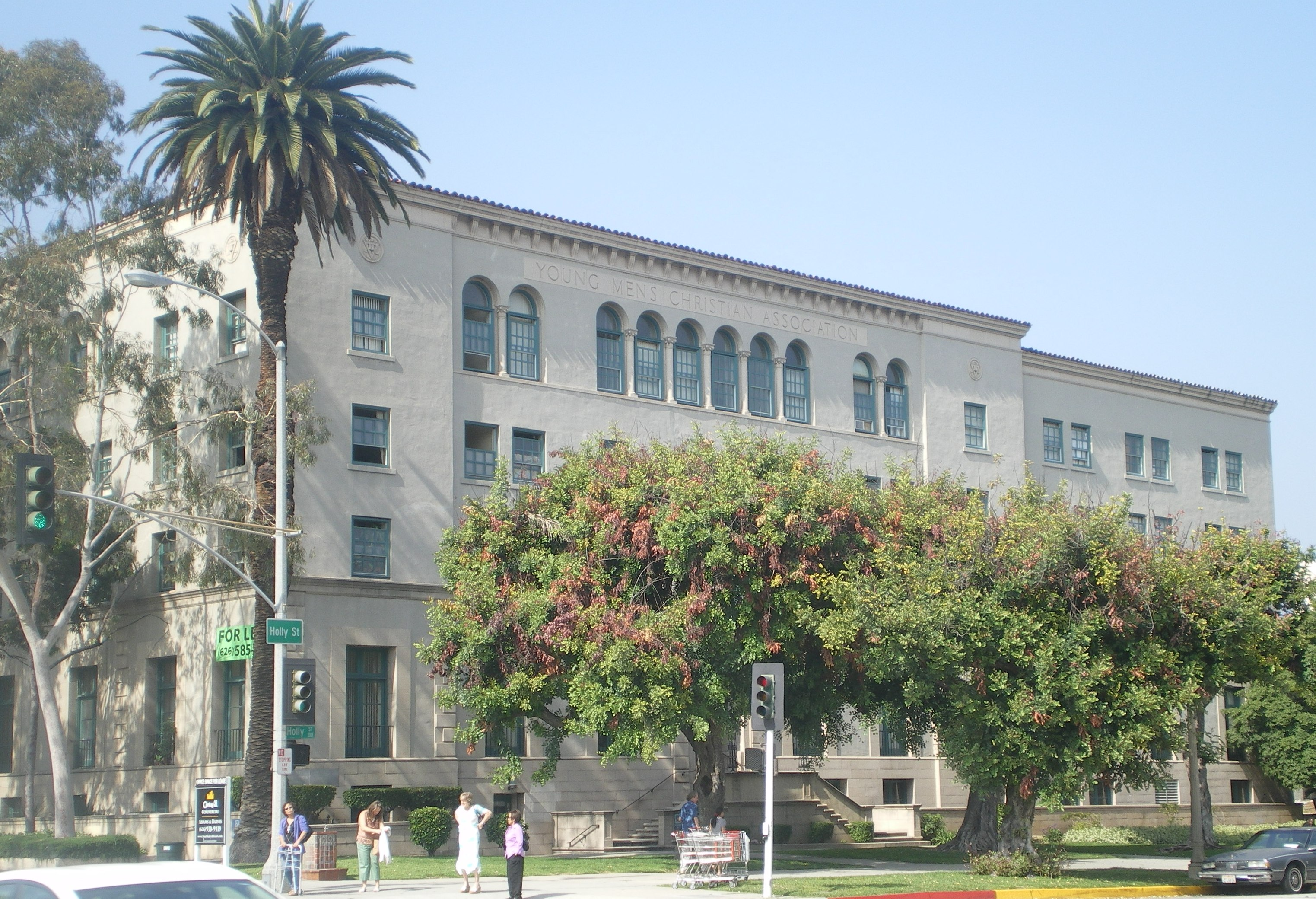
YMCA Building, aka Centennial Place

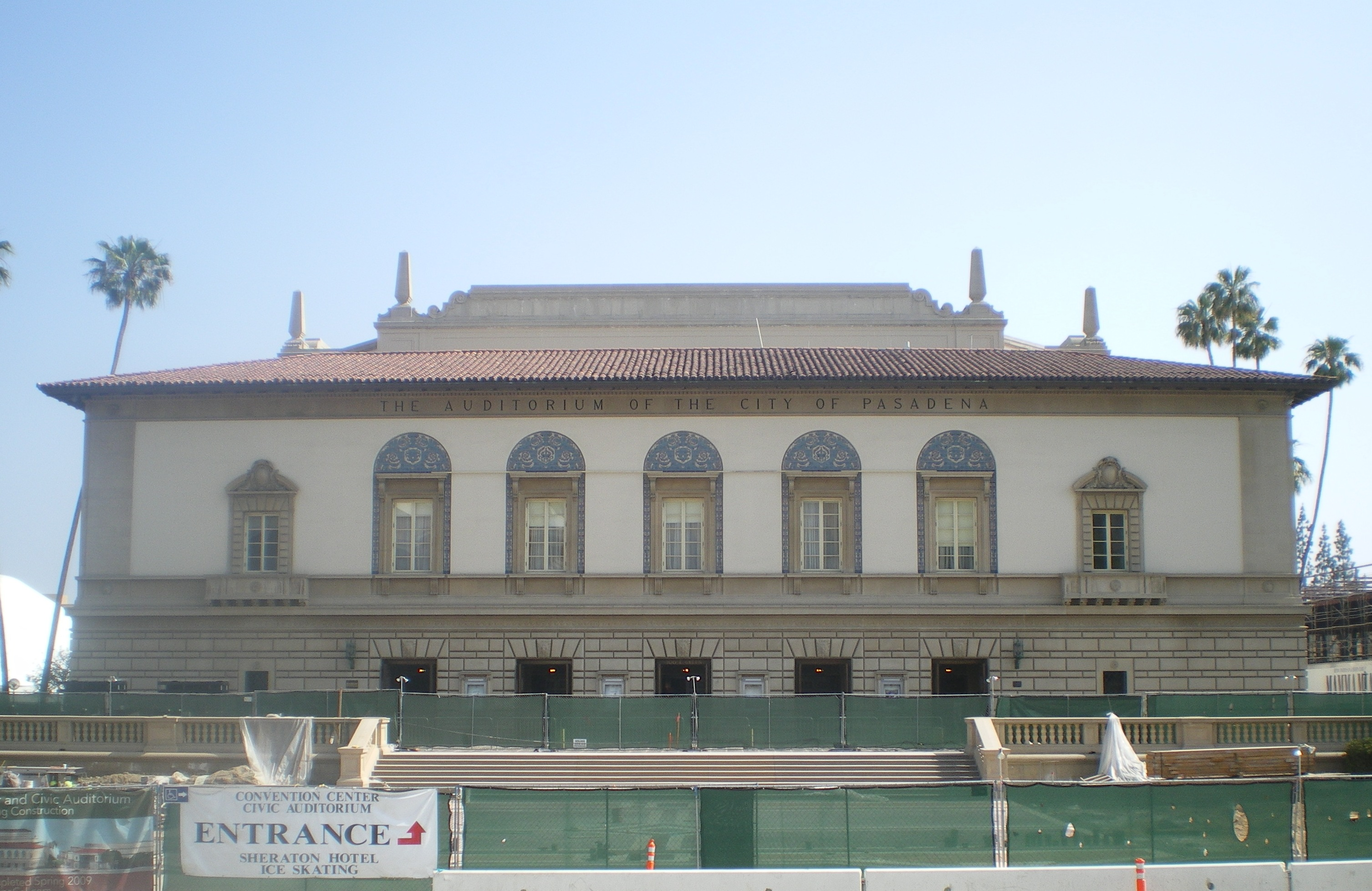
Pasadena Civic Auditorium

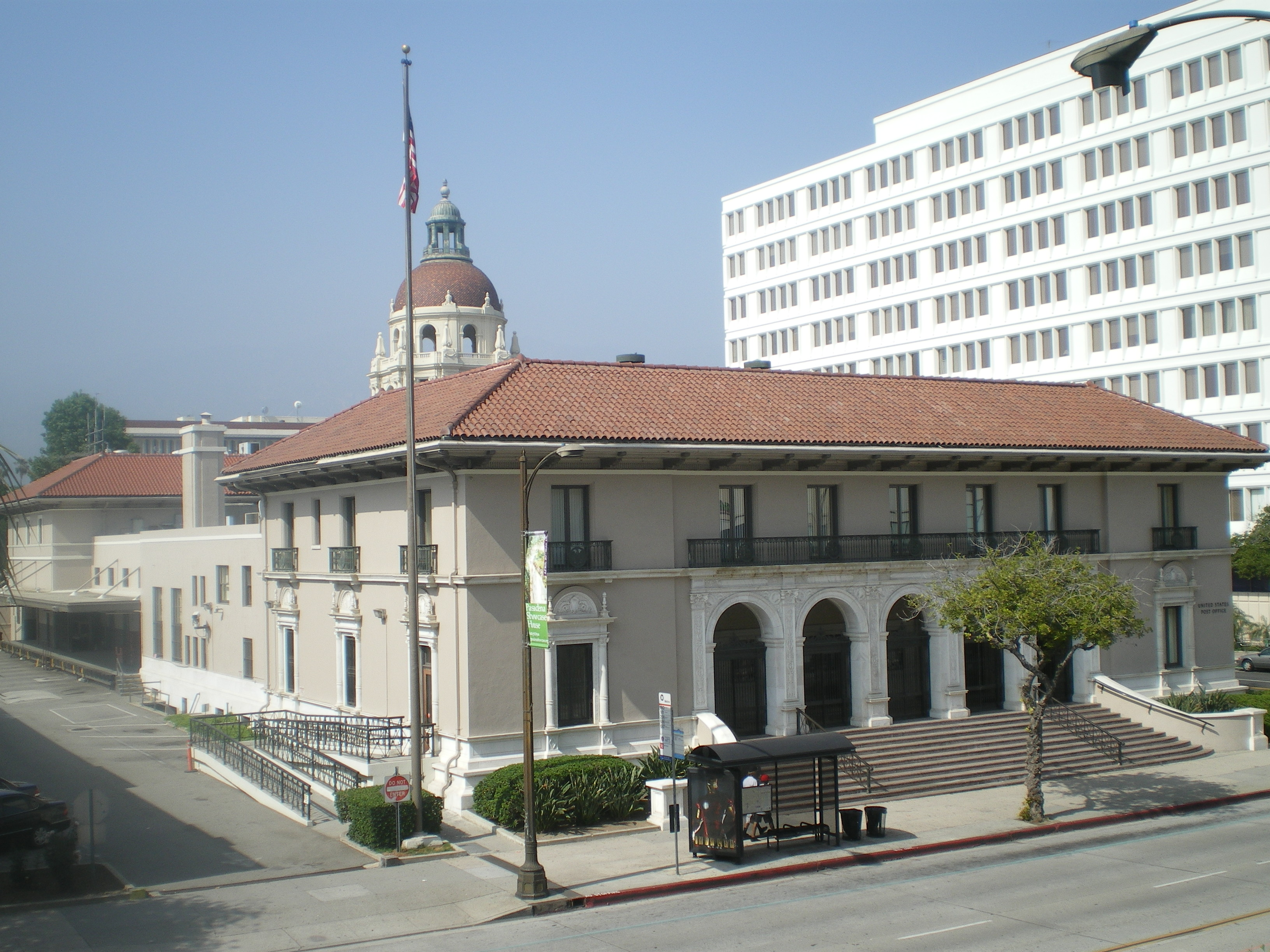
Pasadena Post Office

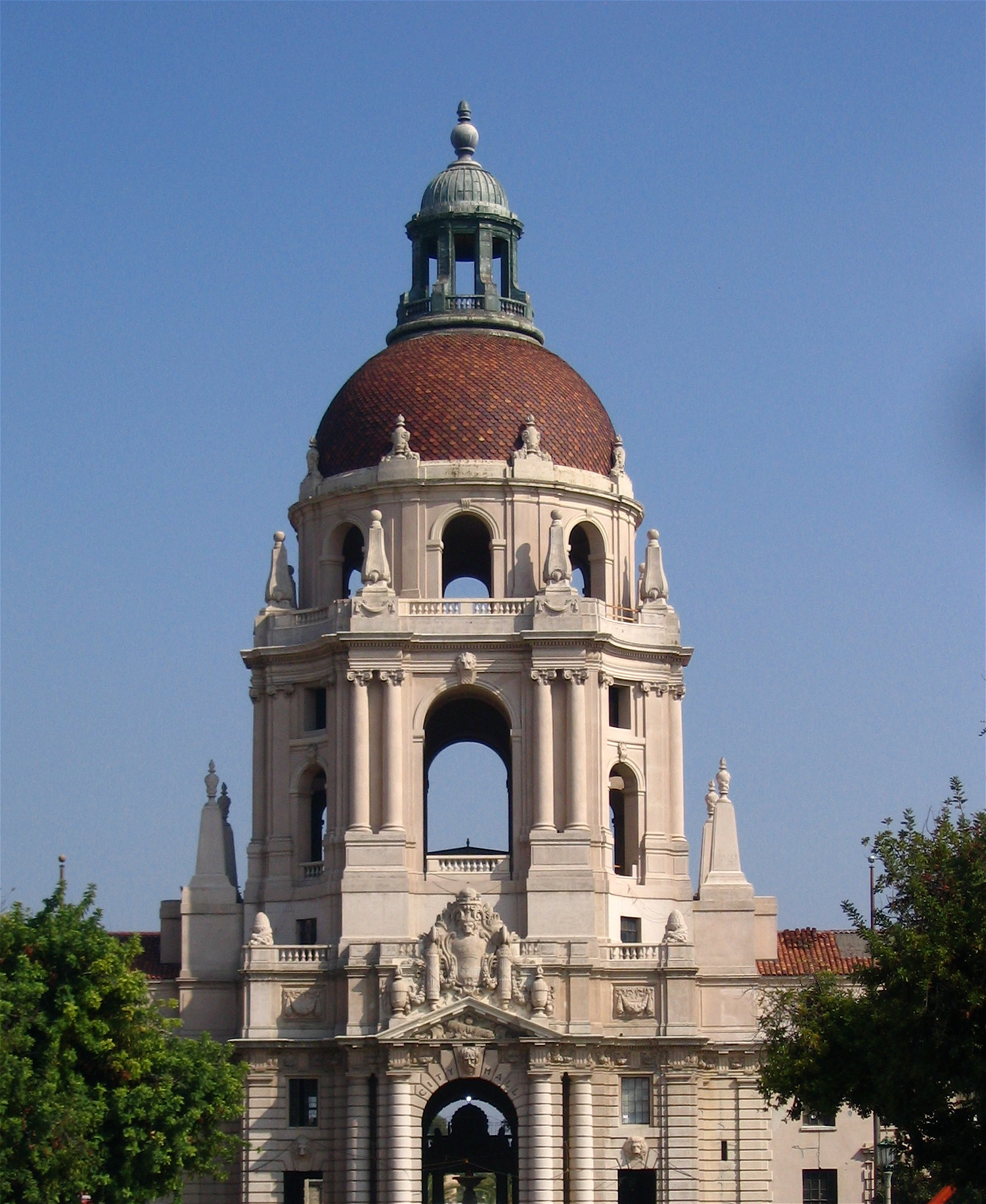
Pasadena City Hall

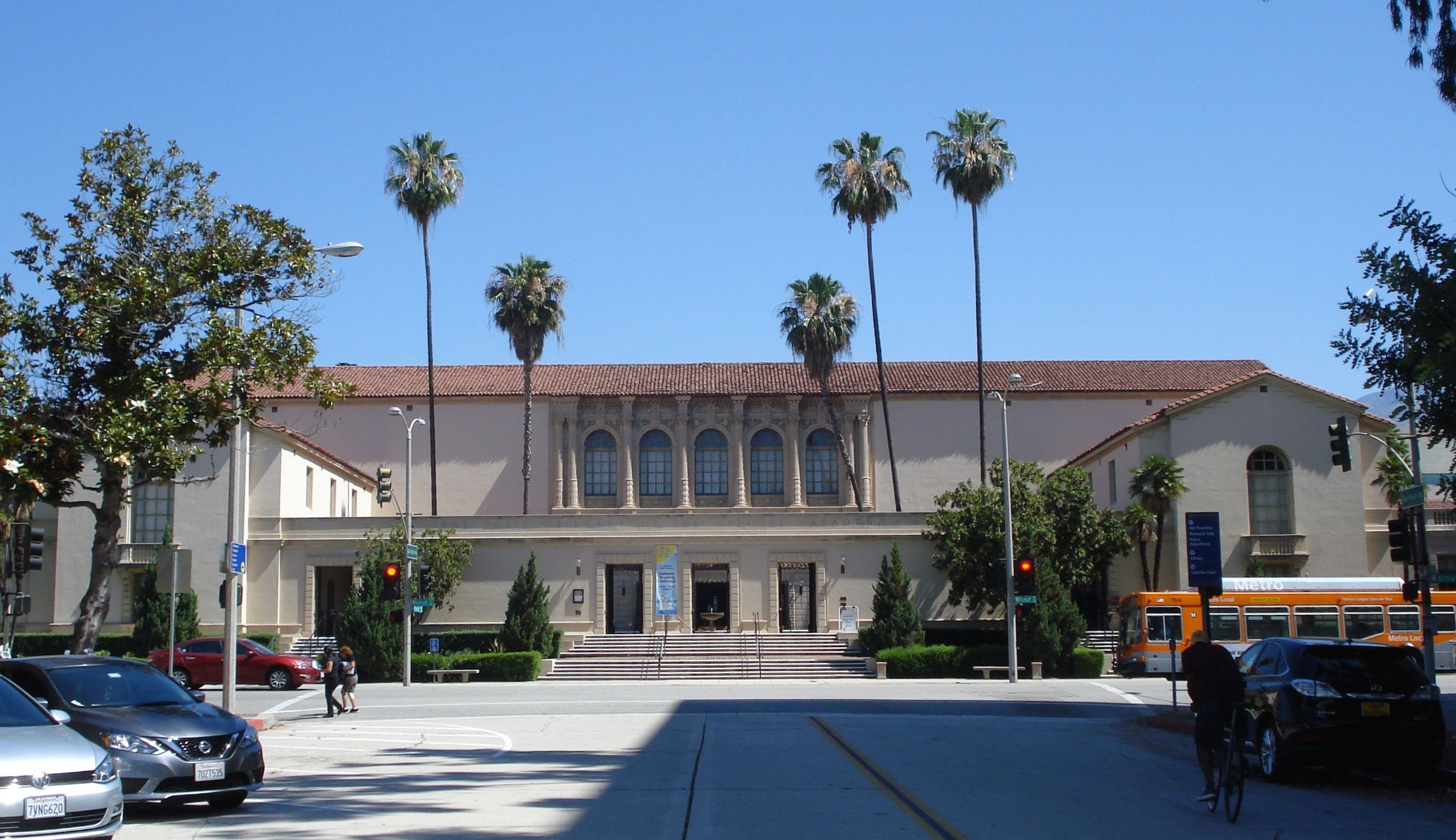
Pasadena Central Library

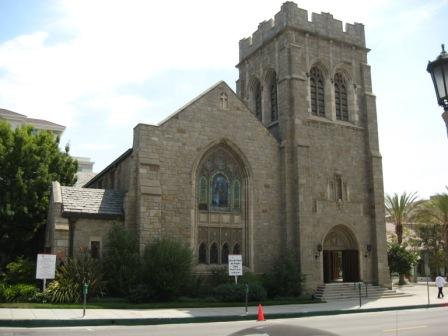
All Saints Episcopal Church, August 30, 2009

== See also ==
- Pasadena City Hall
- Yule marble
