= ServiceTitan =

American software company

ServiceTitan, Inc.
- Type: Public
- Traded as: Nasdaq: TTAN
- Industry: Enterprise software
- Founded: 2007; 19 years ago
- Founders: Ara Mahdessian; Vahe Kuzoyan
- Headquarters: Glendale, California, US
- Key people: Ara Mahdessian (CEO); Vahe Kuzoyan (president)
- Services: Enterprise software
- Revenue: ▲US$771.9 million (2025)
- Net income: ▲US$−195 million (2024)
- Number of employees: 2,870 (2024)
- Website: servicetitan.com

ServiceTitan, Inc. is an American cloud-based software company headquartered in Glendale, California. It provides customer relationship management (CRM) software for tradespersons, with applications focused on sales, customer service, marketing automation, e-commerce and analytics.

== History ==
ServiceTitan was founded by Ara Mahdessian and Vahe Kuzoyan in 2007; their cloud-based platform launched in 2012.

In 2019, the company expanded outside the United States, opening an office in Yerevan, Armenia.

ServiceTitan was planning an initial public offering for 2022 before the market for them soured, but continued to work with investment banks Goldman Sachs and Morgan Stanley to prepare for a stock market listing in 2024. Following the 2024 United States presidential election, ServiceTitan filed for an initial public offering with the Securities and Exchange Commission. On December 12, 2024, ServiceTitan began trading on the Nasdaq under the ticker symbol TTAN, raising approximately $625 million in its initial public offering at $71 per share; shares surged 42% on the first day, opening and closing at $101 and valuing the company at approximately $8.9 billion. Prior to the IPO, the company raised $1.4 billion in eight rounds of funding from investors, including Iconiq Capital, Bessemer Venture Partners, TPG Inc., Index Ventures, and Mucker Capital.

== Acquisitions and partnerships ==
In 2021, the company acquired Aspire Software, a company specializing in software for landscapers, and ServicePro, a company specializing in software for pest control and lawn care contractors.

In January 2022, the company acquired FieldRoutes, a mobile-software-as-a-service provider in the lawn care and pest control industry.

In April 2024, the company acquired Convex, a San-Francisco-based sales and marketing platform.

In June 2025, ServiceTitan partnered with ABC Supply Co. Inc. to provide roofing contractors. In September 2025, ServiceTitan acquired Conduit Tech, an HVAC sales and design platform. In the same month, ServiceTitan partnered with Ford Pro to integrate vehicle data and fleet management tools. In October 2025, ServiceTitan partnered with Home Depot's Path to Pro program.

== Products and services ==
In 2025, ServiceTitan announced a new AI-powered tool, Atlas, to assist contractors with operations.
