= Pasadena City Hall =

Historic city hall of Pasadena, California, U.S.

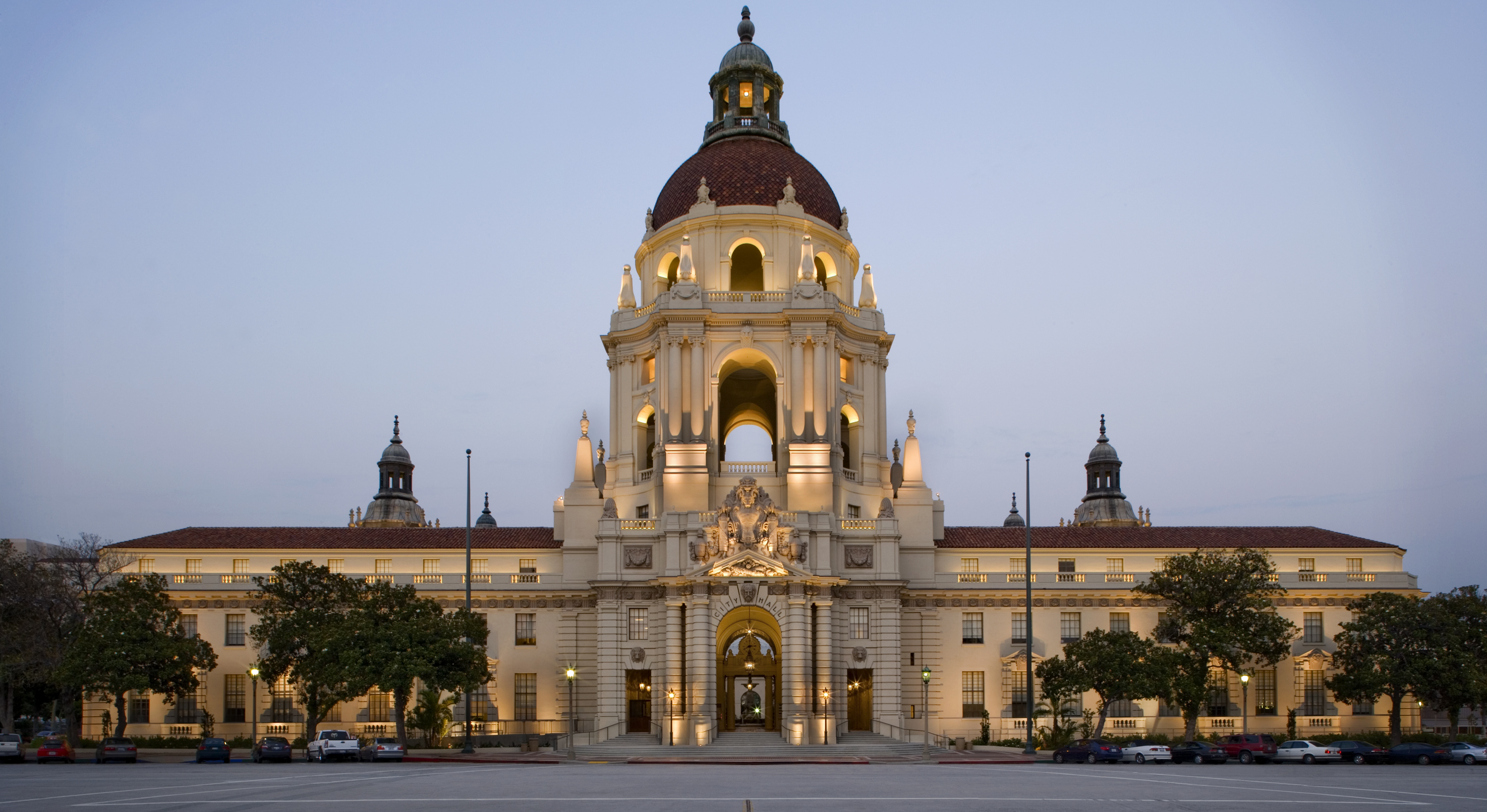
- Pasadena City Hall
- Interactive map of Pasadena City Hall
- Location: 100 North Garfield Avenue, Pasadena, California 91101, U.S.
- Coordinates: 34°8′51.52″N 118°8′37.83″W
- Established: 1927; 99 years ago
- Governing body: City of Pasadena
- Pasadena City Hall
- U.S. Historic district – Contributing property
- Location within the Los Angeles metropolitan area Location within California Location within the United States
- Location: Pasadena, California
- Architectural style: Mediterranean Revival; Spanish Colonial Revival
- Part of: Pasadena Civic Center District (ID80000813)
- Added to NRHP: July 28, 1980

Pasadena City Hall is the historic city hall of Pasadena, California, United States. Completed in 1927, it combines elements of both Mediterranean Revival and Spanish Colonial Revival architecture, and is a significant architectural example of the City Beautiful movement of the 1920s.

== History ==
In 1923, the people of Pasadena approved a bond measure issuing $3.5 million towards the development of a civic center. City Hall was to be the central element of this center. The San Francisco architecture firm of Bakewell and Brown designed City Hall, which has elements of both Mediterranean Revival and Spanish Colonial Revival style architecture. Completed on December 27, 1927 at a cost of $1.3 million, it measures 361 feet (110 m) by 242 feet (74 m) and rises 6 stories. There are over 235 rooms and passageways that cover over 170,000 square feet (16,000 m^{2}). The defining dome, located above the west entrance, is 26 feet (7.9 m) tall and 54 feet (16 m) in diameter. On July 28, 1980 the Civic Center District, including Pasadena City Hall, was listed on the National Register of Historic Places as listing #80000813.

== Seismic retrofit ==
By the late 20th century the building no longer met modern building codes, and studies indicated that a major earthquake could destroy several parts of it, likely resulting in a loss of life. The concrete walls had many deep cracks, and two of the stairway towers had considerable damage. There was also water damage from years of storms with little to no repair and maintenance. An effort to rehabilitate the aging building began in the late 1990s, led by Architectural Resources Group of San Francisco, California.

In July 2004, the building was vacated in order to allow for a complete overhaul of the structure, including a seismic retrofit. Over the course of three years, all offices and council chambers were renovated, the facade was restored, the building was adapted to meet ADA standards, HVAC systems were replaced and modernized, and new landscaping and architectural lighting was installed. To help ensure it would withstand future earthquake activity, the building was lifted off its foundation, equipped with structural base isolators and given a new foundation. The renovation of Pasadena City Hall earned a LEED Gold certification.

Following construction, staff moved back starting in April 2007 and City Hall was fully operational again by July. At the time, the Los Angeles Times noted: "In a city where historic preservation is much like a civic obsession, City Hall has long been among the crown jewels of Pasadena, along with the Colorado Street Bridge, the Rose Bowl and the Gamble House. Although the renovation has been among the costliest public works projects in Pasadena, totaling $117 million, city officials decided that they couldn't risk losing the landmark in another quake."

== In popular culture ==
The City Hall has long been a favorite shooting location for filmmakers. The courtyard was used in the 1995 movie "A Walk in the Clouds" to portray a Napa Valley town square. The building is in also featured in the 2005 film “Rumor Has It” directed by Rob Reiner. It has also been used as an embassy in the "Mission: Impossible" television series, and a villa in Charlie Chaplin's Oscar-nominated 1940 film "The Great Dictator." The building was also portrayed as the city hall of fictional town Pawnee, Indiana, in the television show Parks and Recreation. The dome is visible through the window of the main characters' apartment building in the television show The Big Bang Theory, set in Pasadena. The building featured in the last episode of Jericho; it was used as the City Hall of Cheyenne, Wyoming. The building also appeared in the opening shots of The Amazing Race 21 premiere. The City Hall was also filming location of the episode "The Confession" from the television series The Incredible Hulk and it was also seen in the opening to the TV court show The Judge from 1986 to 1993.

== Gallery ==
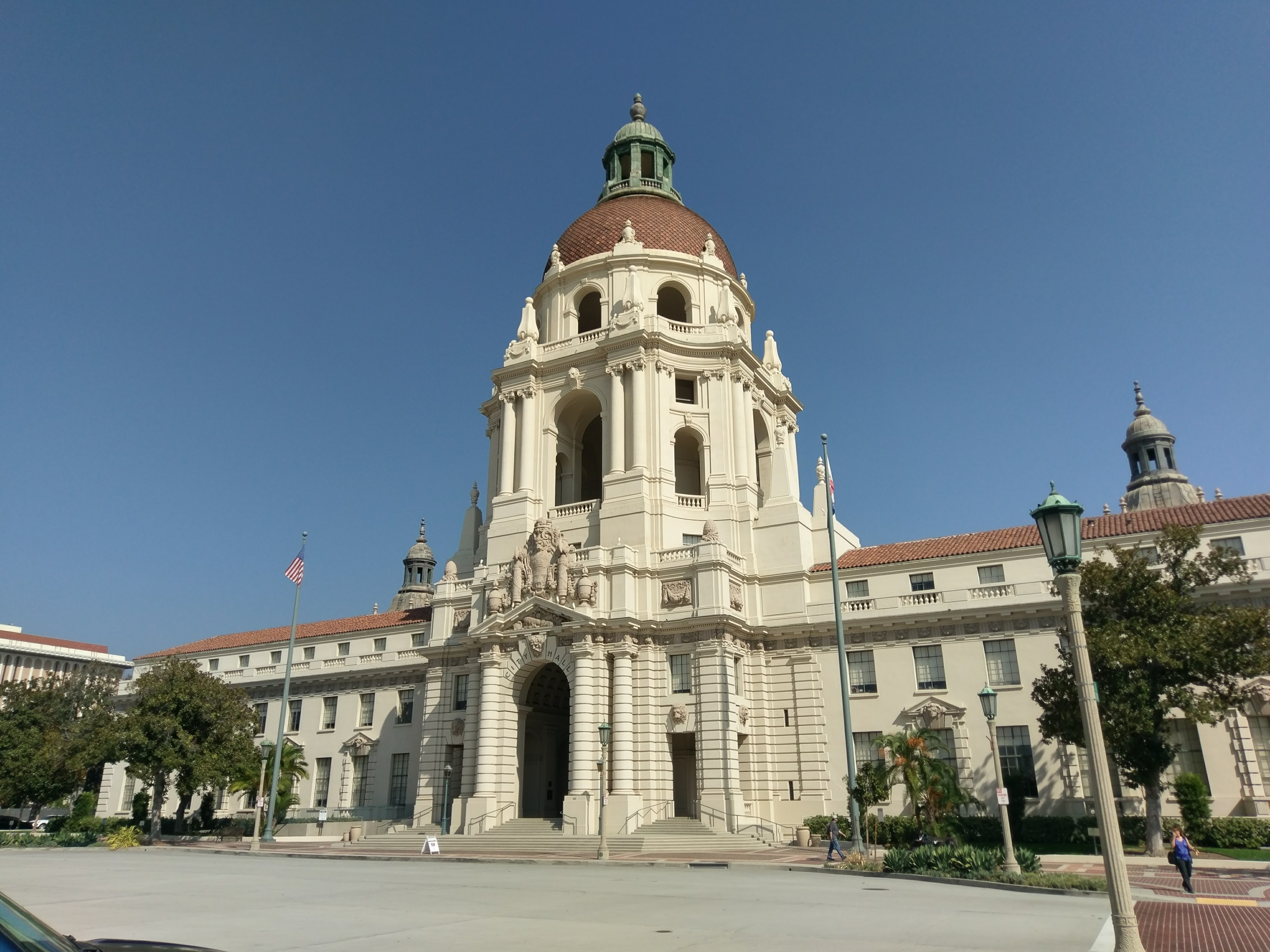
Pasadena City Hall in 2016

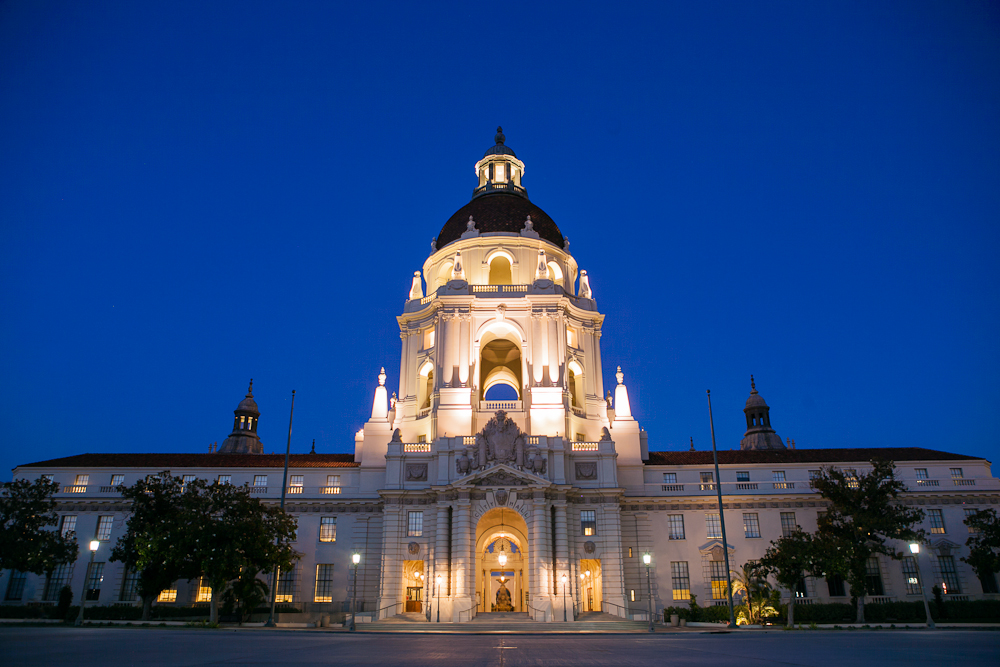
Lit at night

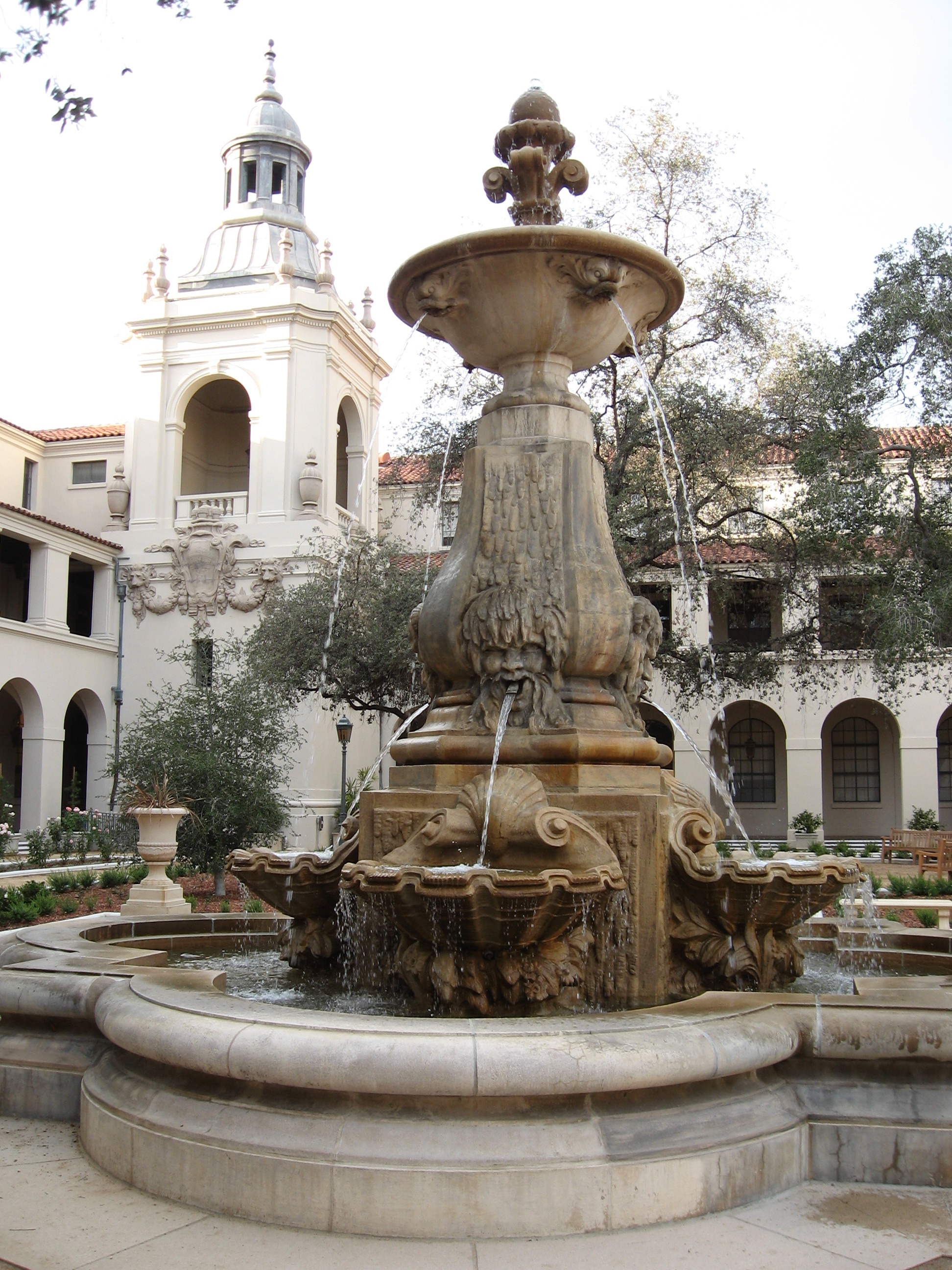
Courtyard

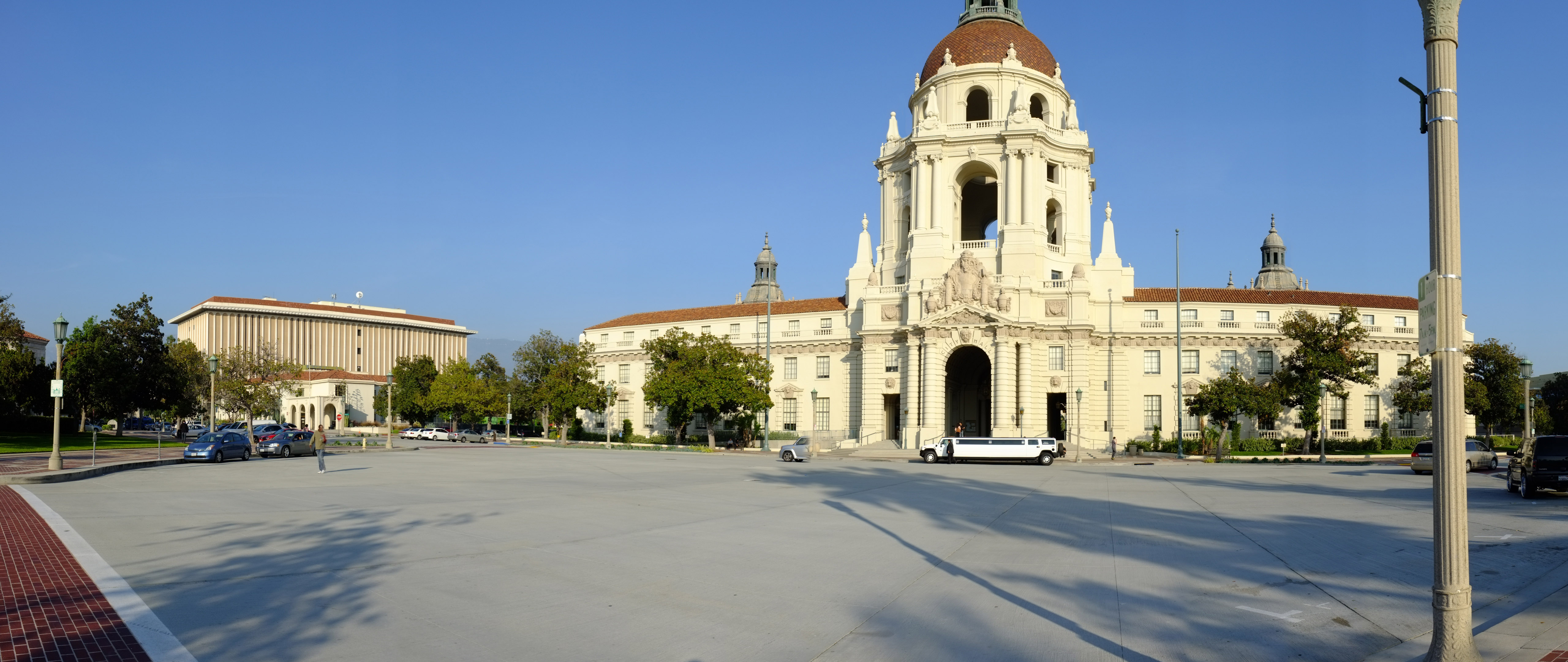
Panorama of Pasadena City Hall and Garfield Ave.

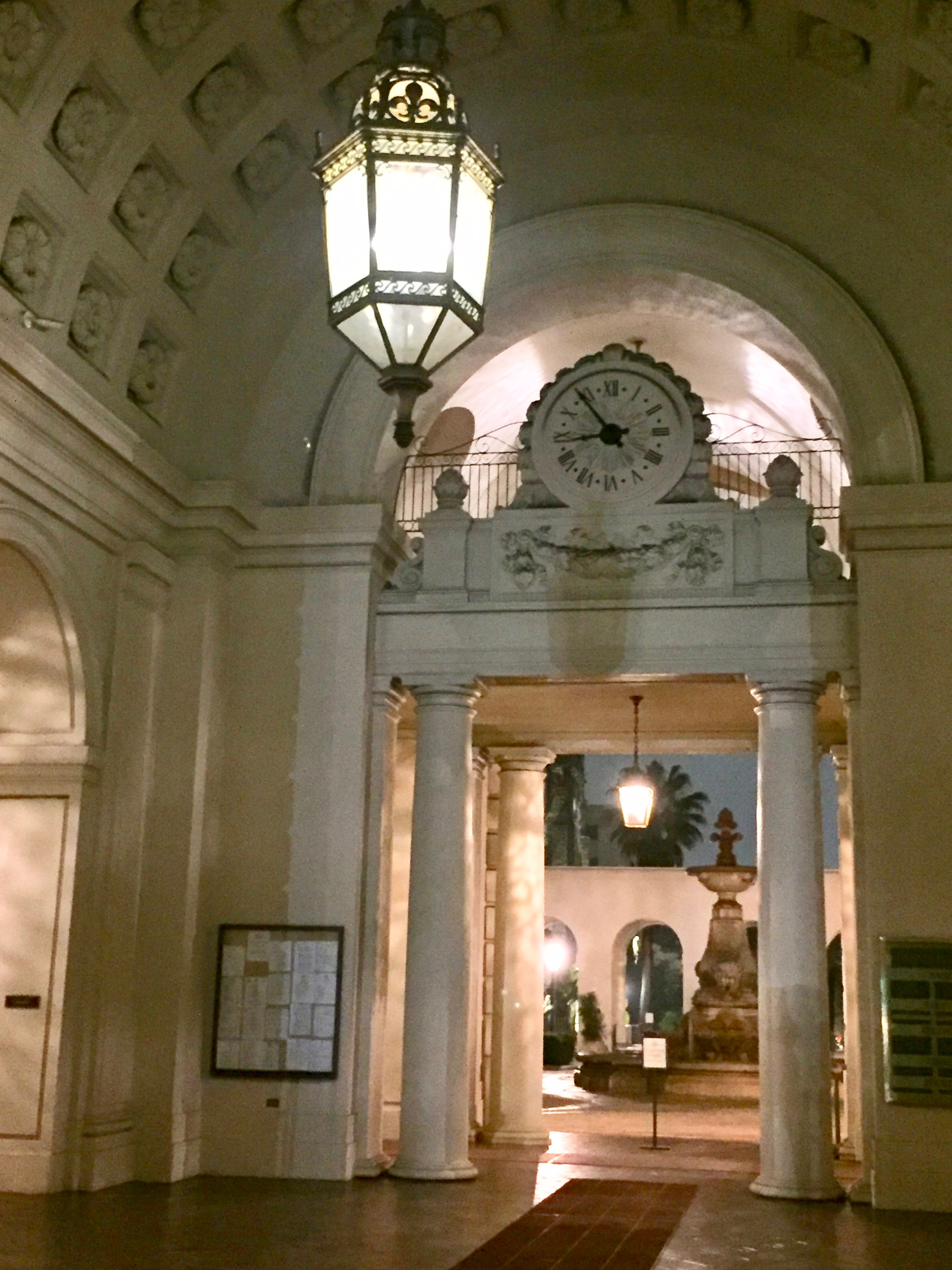
Clock.

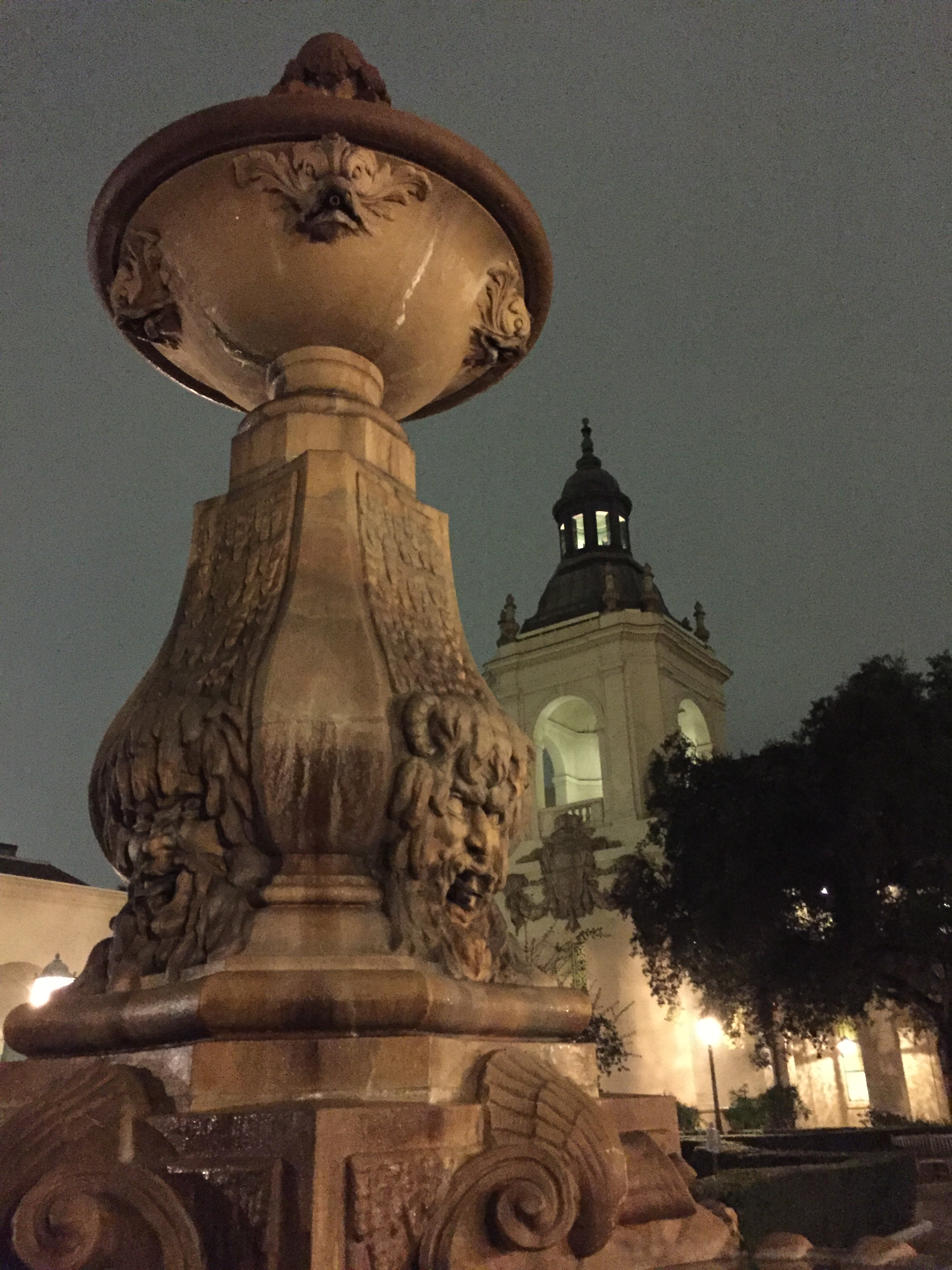
Fountain at night.

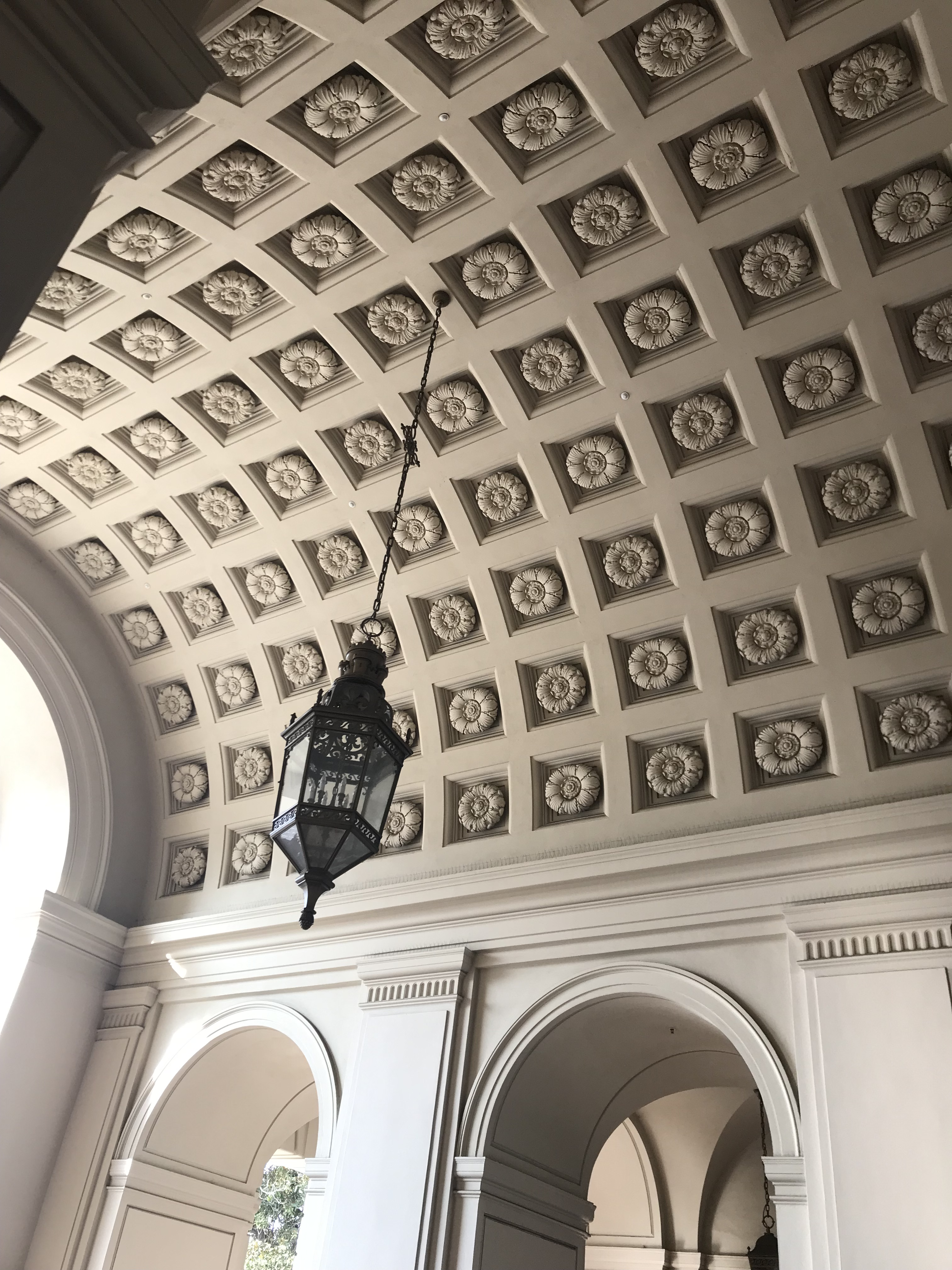
Hanging lamp.

== See also ==
- Pasadena Civic Center District
- Earthquake engineering
