= California State Route 83 =

Highway in California

State Route 83
- Euclid Avenue
- SR 83 highlighted in red

Route information
- Maintained by Caltrans
- Length: 6.41 mi (10.32 km): Portions of SR 83 have been relinquished to or are otherwise maintained by local or other governments, and are not included in the length.; 3.92 miles (6.31 km) when not including a segment of northbound lanes that were also relinquished to the City of Ontario.
- History: 1934 as a highway, 1964 for a number

Major junctions
- South end: SR 71 at Chino Hills–Chino border
- North end: Merrill Avenue (northbound lanes) and Riverside Drive (southbound lanes) at the Chino–Ontario border (State Maintenance)

Location
- Country: United States
- State: California
- Counties: San Bernardino

Highway system
- State highways in California; Interstate; US; State; Scenic; History; Pre‑1964; Unconstructed; Deleted; Freeways
← SR 82	→ SR 84

State Route 83 (SR 83), also or primarily known as Euclid Avenue, is a state highway and city street in the U.S. state of California. Though some maps and signs may mark SR 83 as continuous, control of the highway have been relinquished in piecemeal segments to local jurisdictions, with the goal of decommissioning SR 83 as a state highway. Since June 2024, SR 83 officially runs from the Chino Valley Freeway (State Route 71) at the Chino Hills–Chino border north to the Chino–Ontario border. Euclid Avenue then continues north through Upland to the unincorporated community of San Antonio Heights.

Euclid Avenue passes through several historic districts. The segment of the road between Philadelphia Street in Ontario and 24th Street in Upland is listed on the National Register of Historic Places.

== Route description ==
Route 83 is defined in section 383, subdivision (a), of the California Streets and Highways Code, last amended by the California State Legislature in January 2024, and that the highway is "from Route 71 to Route 10 near the City of Upland". Subdivision (b) of section 383 states that the relinquished former northern segment of Route 83 in Upland is no longer officially part of the state highway system, but the city must still "maintain signs directing motorists to the continuation of Route 83". Subdivisions (c) and (d) of section 383 permit the state to also relinquish control of all or a portion of Route 83 located in the cities of Ontario and Chino respectively. If a full relinquishment occurs under both subdivisions, Route 83 will be removed from the state highway system.

Route 83 is a major north–south arterial serving the cities and communities of Western San Bernardino County. Known as Euclid Avenue for its entire length, the route begins at its southern terminus at the Chino Valley Freeway (State Route 71) and traverses the communities of Chino, Ontario, and Upland before reaching the San Bernardino Freeway (Interstate 10). Euclid Avenue, as a city street in Upland, and later a county road in unincorporated San Bernardino County, then continues north into the unincorporated community of San Antonio Heights and provides direct access to Mount Baldy.

North of the Pomona Freeway (State Route 60), Route 83 follows an expanded right of way with six lanes of traffic and a 30-foot (9.1 m) wide landscaped median. Through the communities of Ontario, and Upland, the route traverses several designated historic districts, with craftsman homes and civic buildings dating from the late 19th century lining either side of the street. South of the Pomona Freeway (State Route 60), Route 83 assumes the characteristics of a rural highway, narrowing to two lanes while passing through what was traditionally agricultural land.

SR 83 is part of the California Freeway and Expressway System, and is part of the National Highway System, a network of highways that are considered essential to the country's economy, defense, and mobility by the Federal Highway Administration.

== History ==
- Euclid Avenue
- U.S. National Register of Historic Places
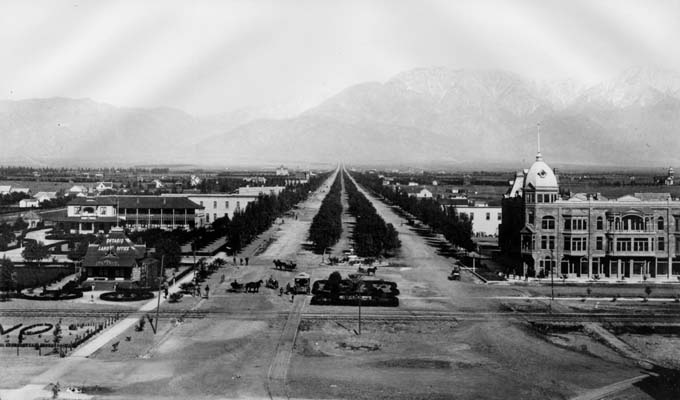
- Looking north on Euclid Ave., Ontario, 1885
- Interactive map of Euclid Avenue
- Location: From 24th St. in Upland to Philadelphia St. in Ontario, in Ontario and Upland, California
- Coordinates: 34°9′1″N 117°39′2″W
- Area: 203 acres (82 ha)
- Built: 1882
- Architect: Chaffey, George Jr. and W.B.; Frankish, Charles
- NRHP reference No.: 05000843
- Added to NRHP: August 10, 2005

The segment of Euclid Avenue from Philadelphia Street in Ontario north to 24th Street in Upland was added to the National Register of Historic Places as a historic district in 2005. The historic district includes a Madonna of the Trail monument, one contributing site, one contributing structure, and three contributing objects over a 203 acres (82 ha).

Originally, SR 83 extended north from I-10 to the Foothill Freeway (State Route 210) in Upland, but the state relinquished that segment and turned it over to local control. There has never been any direct connection from Euclid Avenue to the Foothill Freeway (State Route 210) in Upland. During the planning stages for the construction of the Foothill Freeway through the area, Upland residents (in conjunction with the residents of other communities along the route) successfully petitioned the State and local governments to require Caltrans to construct the new freeway 'below grade', i.e. build the road surface of the freeway below the elevation of the surrounding terrain. Furthermore, due to concerns of existing traffic volume, noise, etc. along major thoroughfares, such as Euclid Avenue, many Upland residents who lived along or near Euclid Avenue did not want a fully functional interchange at the junction between the new freeway and the street as it was anticipated that doing so would increase traffic and noise, thereby undermining the aesthetic qualities of the street and negatively affecting the residents' "quality of life". Thus, at the intersection of SR 83 and SR 210, there are no on/offramps or associated improvements like traffic lights - direct access between the highways is not possible. Instead, on both sides of the Euclid Avenue overpass there are two wide landscaped areas that provide a visual (and to a lesser extent, acoustic) buffer between the street and the freeway passing below. The landscaped area also serves to provide continuity with the landscaped segments of the street to the north and south of the intersection.

== Future ==
The California State Legislature passed AB 744 in 2021 and AB 250 in 2023, amending the California Streets and Highways Code defining Route 83 to allow the state to relinquish segments of the state highway to the cities of Ontario and Chino, respectively. An early draft of AB 744 explicitly mentioned "the southbound portion between Merrill Avenue and Riverside Drive within the City of Chino", referencing the segment of the Chino–Ontario border that runs along SR 83's median strip, but that line was removed. In June 2024, Ontario took control over its segment of the highway, including those northbound lanes between Merrill Avenue and Riverside Drive within its borders. Once all these segments are relinquished, SR 83 will cease to exist.

== Major intersections ==
Except where prefixed with a letter, postmiles were measured on the road as it was in 1964, based on the alignment that existed at the time, and do not necessarily reflect current mileage. Postmile prefixes include: R reflecting a realignment in the route since then, M indicating a second realignment, L referring to an overlap due to a correction or change, and T indicating postmiles classified as temporary. Segments that remain unconstructed or have been relinquished to local control may be omitted. The entire route is in San Bernardino County.

Location	Postmile	Destinations	Notes
Chino Hills–Chino line	R0.00	Butterfield Ranch Road	Continuation beyond SR 71
Chino Hills–Chino line	R0.00	SR 71 (Chino Valley Freeway)	Interchange; SR 71 exit 4
Chino–Ontario line	3.92	Merrill Avenue	North end of state maintenance (northbound lanes heading into Ontario's side of the line)
Chino–Ontario line	6.41	Riverside Drive	North end of state maintenance (southbound lanes heading into Chino's side of the line)
Ontario	7.18	SR 60 (Pomona Freeway) – Riverside, Los Angeles	Interchange; SR 60 exit 35
Ontario	8.88	Mission Boulevard – Riverside, Pomona	Former US 60
Ontario	9.46	Holt Boulevard	Former US 70 / US 99
Ontario–Upland line	11.11	I-10 (San Bernardino Freeway) – Los Angeles, San Bernardino	Interchange; I-10 exit 51
Upland	12.49	SR 66 (Foothill Boulevard)	Former US 66
Upland	14.19	19th Street	Former SR 30
Upland	14.19	Euclid Avenue – Mount Baldy	Continuation beyond 19th Street
1.000 mi = 1.609 km; 1.000 km = 0.621 mi
