= South Diamond Bar, California =

Unincorporated area in California, United States

- Unincorporated area
- Location in the United States South Diamond Bar, California (the United States)
- Coordinates: 33°57′25″N 117°49′20″W
- Country: United States
- State: California
- County: Los Angeles

Population
  - Total: 0
- Time zone: UTC-8 (PST)
  - Summer (DST): UTC-7 (PDT)
- ZIP code: 91709, 91765, 92823
- Area code: 909

South Diamond Bar is an unincorporated area in eastern Los Angeles County, which has been designated an agricultural zone, according to the Los Angeles County Regional Planning Department.

Though unincorporated, the land is owned by the City of Industry. It is commonly called the Ranch. There is no commercial or residential land in the area. As such, the population is zero.

There is a camping ground in the area called the Firestone Boy Scout Reservation, which is available to nonprofit youth groups. The street address of the camping ground is labeled as Brea, despite it not being located within the city of Brea, and only a small portion being located in Orange County.

The area is bordered by Diamond Bar to the north and Chino Hills to the east.

== Geography ==
South Diamond Bar is located at 33°57′25″N 117°49′20″W (33.95694, -117.82228). The CA-57 Freeway runs along the western edge of the area.
