= California State Route 57 =

Highway in California

State Route 57
- Orange Freeway
- Constructed portion of State Route 57 highlighted in red

Route information
- Maintained by Caltrans
- Length: 25.84 mi (41.59 km)
- History: State highway in 1931; numbered in 1964

Major junctions
- South end: I-5 / SR 22 in Orange
- SR 91 in Anaheim; SR 60 in Diamond Bar; I-10 / SR 71 in Pomona
- North end: I-210 / SR 210 in Glendora

Location
- Country: United States
- State: California
- Counties: Orange, Los Angeles

Highway system
- State highways in California; Interstate; US; State; Scenic; History; Pre‑1964; Unconstructed; Deleted; Freeways
← SR 56	→ SR 58

State Route 57 (SR 57), also known as the Orange Freeway for most of its length, is a north–south state highway in the Greater Los Angeles Area of the U.S. state of California. It connects the interchange of Interstate 5 (I-5) and SR 22 near downtown Orange, locally known as the Orange Crush, to the Glendora Curve interchange with the Foothill Freeway (I-210 and SR 210) in Glendora. The highway provides a route across several spurs of the Peninsular Ranges, linking the Los Angeles Basin with the Pomona Valley and San Gabriel Valley. SR 57 is also known colloquially as "the 57" to Southern California residents.

A predecessor to this road ran through Brea Canyon by the early 20th century and was added to the state highway system. The freeway was built in stages during the 1950s, one of which included the Brea Canyon Freeway; SR 57 was designated as part of the 1964 state highway renumbering. The final portion of the present-day Orange Freeway was not completed until the mid-1970s. The latest piece of SR 57 to be added was formerly part of I-210, after SR 210 was legislatively extended to San Bernardino in 1998. An unconstructed extension from Santa Ana south to Huntington Beach remains in the legal definition of SR 57, and has been studied as a toll road above the Santa Ana River.

== Route description ==
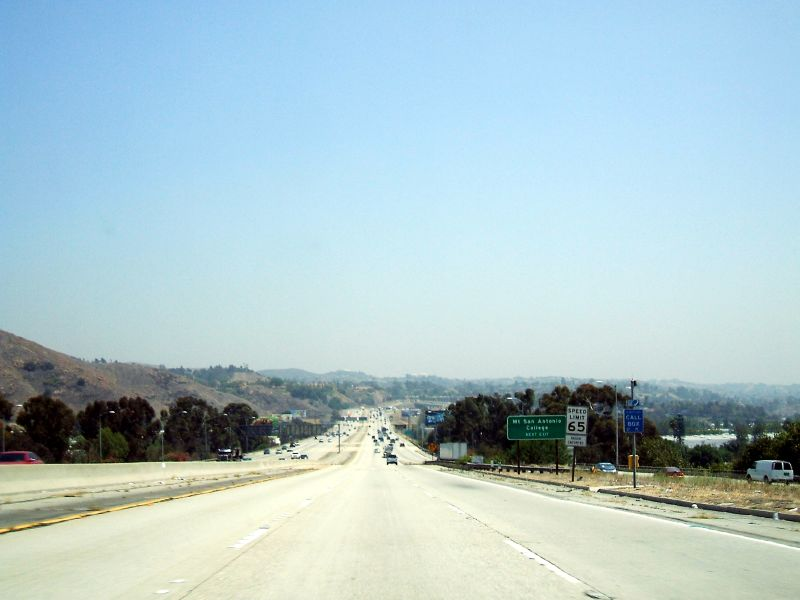
Southbound in San Dimas, leaving the Kellogg Hill Interchange

Route 57 is defined in section 357 of the California Streets and Highways Code:

Route 57 is from:
(a) Route 1 near Huntington Beach to Route 22 near Santa Ana.
(b) Route 5 near Santa Ana to Route 210 near San Dimas.

The highway is not fully constructed to extend south to near Huntington Beach as it is defined.

SR 57 begins at the Orange Crush interchange near downtown Orange, where it meets the northwest–southeast Santa Ana Freeway (I-5) and the east–west Garden Grove Freeway (SR 22). The Orange Crush interchange, which had long been considered a major bottleneck, was rebuilt in the 1990s and 2000s. The freeway heads north from the junction and soon crosses to the west side of the Santa Ana River, continuing north through suburban portions of Anaheim and passing next to Anaheim Regional Transportation Intermodal Center, Angel Stadium and Honda Center. In northern Anaheim, SR 57 meets the Riverside Freeway (SR 91). SR 57 briefly passes through Placentia and Fullerton, providing access to California State University, Fullerton. As it crosses Imperial Highway (SR 90) near the Brea Mall and enters Brea, SR 57 enters more rugged terrain before climbing through Brea Canyon, the gap between the Chino Hills and Puente Hills. Near the rim of the canyon, the highway curves north out of the Brea Canyon, and descends slightly to a junction with the Pomona Freeway (SR 60) in Diamond Bar, right on the edge of the San Gabriel Valley.

A short overlap carries SR 57 traffic on the same roadway as SR 60. The two routes head northeast through an arm of the San Gabriel Valley; after they split, SR 57 ascends slightly and then slopes through the edge of the Puente Hills and into the west end of the Pomona Valley. Here it meets the San Bernardino Freeway (I-10) and Chino Valley Freeway (SR 71) at the four-level Kellogg Hill Interchange. In the north half of that interchange, SR 57 enters the San Jose Hills, climbing to its highest elevation before descending back into the connected San Gabriel and Pomona Valleys and ending at the Glendora Curve interchange with the Foothill Freeway (I-210) in Glendora.

High-occupancy vehicle lanes (HOV) exist in the median of SR 57 south of SR 60 in Diamond Bar. Elevated ramps allow HOV traffic bound to or from Brea Canyon to connect with I-5 towards the southeast, SR 91 towards the west, or SR 60 towards the east without entering the main lanes.

SR 57 is legally eligible for the State Scenic Highway System through Brea Canyon, between SR 90 and SR 60, though it has not officially been designated as a scenic highway by the California Department of Transportation. The entire route is in the California Freeway and Expressway System, and is a freeway for its entire constructed length. SR 57 is also part of the National Highway System (NHS), a network of highways that are essential to the country's economy, defense, and mobility. The highway from SR 1 to SR 60 in Diamond Bar is officially designated as the Orange Freeway. In 2013, SR 57 had an annual average daily traffic (AADT) of 129,000 between SR 60 and Sunset Crossing Road in Diamond Bar, and 278,500 between SR 91 in Anaheim and Orangethorpe Avenue in Placentia, the latter of which was the highest AADT for the highway.

== History ==
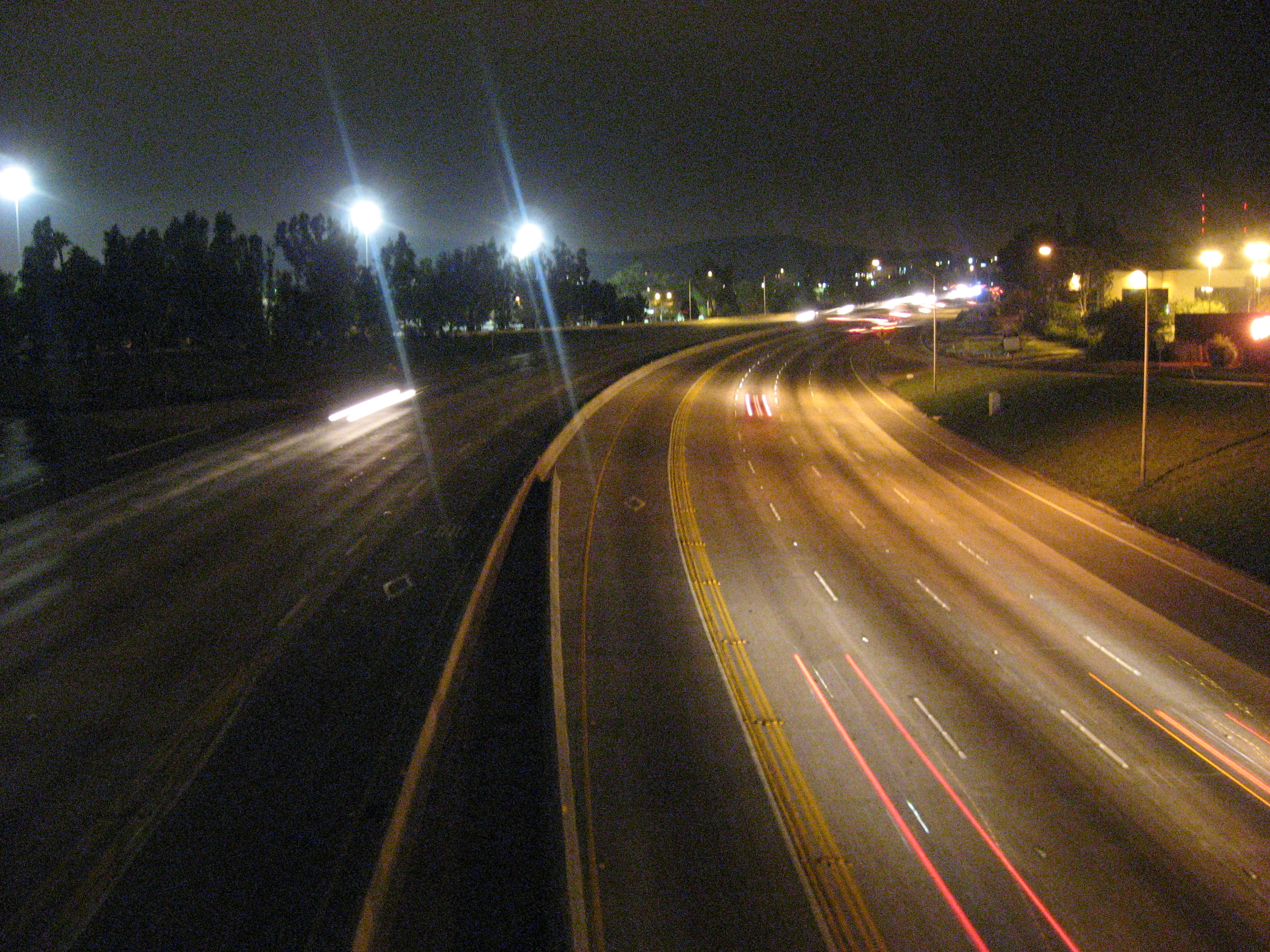
Looking north from Imperial Highway (SR 90) in Brea

The road through Brea Canyon was oiled dirt by the late 1910s, providing a good connection across an outbranching of the Peninsular Ranges between the Los Angeles Basin and Pomona Valley. This road left the main coast highway (Harbor Boulevard) at Fullerton and followed the present Brea Boulevard and Brea Canyon Road, merging with the Valley Boulevard from Los Angeles near Walnut and continuing east to Pomona via Valley and Pomona Boulevards. Los Angeles County paved the road in concrete in early 1923, and in 1931 it was added to the state highway system as a branch of Route 19. Until then, Route 19 had connected Route 9 near Claremont with Riverside, following Garey Avenue and Mission Boulevard through Pomona.

The state built a bypass of the Valley Boulevard portion of the route in the early-to-mid-1930s, leaving the old road near Diamond Bar and heading northeast through the foothills, along the present freeway alignment and Mission Boulevard. To the south, the legislature added then-unrelated Route 180 along State College Boulevard in 1933, connecting Route 2 (I-5) near the Santa Ana River with Route 175 (Orangethorpe Avenue, later replaced by SR 91) near Placentia. By 1955, the Brea Canyon Freeway was proposed to begin at the Santa Ana Freeway (I-5) near La Veta Avenue in Santa Ana and head north, paralleling Routes 180 and 19 to Pomona. The portion northeast of Diamond Bar into Pomona soon became part of the planned Pomona Freeway, and the name of the remainder was changed to Orange Freeway. The state legislature altered the definition of Route 19 to reflect this in 1957 by moving its south end to Santa Ana.

Then, in 1957, the northernmost part of present SR 57 was added to the state highway system as part of Route 240, which the legislature designated along the route planned for I-210. This became part of the proposed Temescal Freeway, later the Corona Freeway; a southerly extension of the Orange Freeway to Legislative Route 60 (SR 1) near Huntington Beach was added in 1959 as Route 273. Also in 1959, the legislature created Route 272, extending the line of the Orange Freeway north from the Pomona Freeway to the Temescal Freeway, completing the proposed freeway corridor that is now SR 57. When the entire route, except Route 240 which was still part of I-210, was redesignated SR 57 in the 1964 renumbering, none of these proposed freeways had been built; the only constructed segment was the old surface road from Fullerton towards Pomona. The part of old Route 19 east of Route 272 became part of SR 60. As part of the same renumbering, Route 180 on State College Boulevard became Route 250, which was amended the next year to provide for its deletion once that portion of the SR 57 freeway was completed (between I-5 and SR 91).

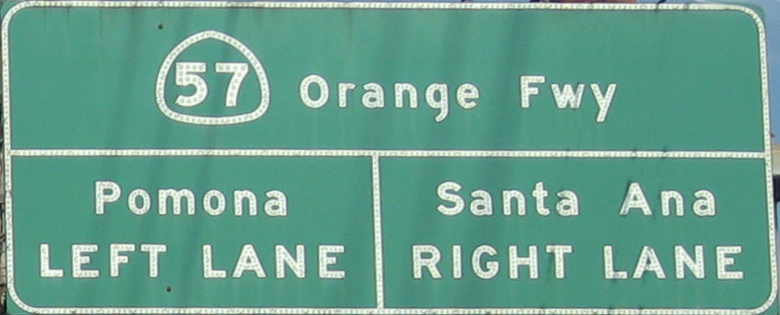
Sign on Lambert Road in Brea

A groundbreaking ceremony was held in Placentia on January 30, 1967, to begin construction of the Orange Freeway. The first portion was dedicated on May 16, 1969, and opened soon after, extending north from the Riverside Freeway (SR 91) to Nutwood Avenue in Fullerton. Over the next few years, the freeway was completed from SR 91 north to I-10, and I-210 was built north to the present end of SR 57; the Pomona Freeway (SR 60), which overlaps it through Diamond Bar, was constructed at the same time. The last pieces of that portion were the freeway through Brea Canyon, which opened March 13, 1972, and the four-level Kellogg Hill Interchange at I-10, which was dedicated May 1, 1972, and opened soon thereafter. Finally, the Orange Freeway was extended south from SR 91 to I-5 in the mid-1970s, allowing Route 250 to be turned back to local governments, though the subsequent deletion from the Streets and Highways Code did not take place until 1981. With the extension of SR 210 around San Bernardino in 1998, the former easternmost piece of I-210 to the Kellogg Hill Interchange instead became a northerly extension of SR 57, though it remains officially part of the Interstate Highway System.

== Future ==
The southerly extension to Huntington Beach remains unconstructed. In 1986, Orange County's plans were for a toll road elevated above the Santa Ana River rather than through existing neighborhoods, only extending south to the San Diego Freeway (I-405) in Costa Mesa with connections to the Corona del Mar Freeway (SR 73); this was largely inspired by congestion on SR 55 through the Santa Ana area. The extension was considered by Caltrans as two 11.2-mile-long (18.0-kilometer), two-lane viaducts that would cost $950 million. The toll road franchise that the American Transportation Development (ATD) held for this portion of SR 57 expired in January 2001, after a request to delay the expiration until January 2007. Following this, ATD sued to restore the franchise, and this case lasted until November 2003. The termination was due to ATD not beginning the construction during the first ten years of the franchise, after it had been enacted by the state legislature.

In April 2009, the Orange County Transportation Authority continued to study the extension of SR 57, where the freeway would travel along the Santa Ana River and terminate at I-405 in Fountain Valley.

The northbound widening between Katella Avenue and SR 91 was finished in 2014. To keep the flow of the northbound fifth lane which ends after the Orangewood Avenue exit and resumes after the Katella Avenue exit, Caltrans and OCTA plan to widen that 0.5 mile strip of road to add one more lane in the northbound direction. This also brings safety to stopping sight distances for drivers in the HOV lane with increased distance from the median barrier. Increased spacing between the direct on-ramp at Orangewood and off-ramp at Katella improve weave length.

== Exit list ==
County	Location	mi	km	Exit	Destinations	Notes
Orange	Santa Ana–Orange line	0.19	0.31	1A	I-5 south (Santa Ana Freeway) – Santa Ana	No access to I-5 north; southern terminus of SR 57; southern end of Orange Crush interchange; I-5 north exit 107A
Orange	Santa Ana–Orange line	0.19	0.31	♦	I-5 south	HOV access only; southbound exit and northbound entrance
Orange	Santa Ana–Orange line	0.24	0.39	1B	SR 22 east (Garden Grove Freeway) – Orange	Southbound exit and northbound entrance; northern end of Orange Crush interchange; SR 22 east exit 14D, west exit 14B
Orange	Santa Ana–Orange line	0.38	0.61	1C	SR 22 west (Garden Grove Freeway) / Bristol Street / La Veta Avenue – Long Beach	Southbound exit and northbound entrance; northern end of Orange Crush interchange; SR 22 east exit 14D, west exit 14B
Orange	Orange	0.56	0.90	1D	Chapman Avenue – Orange	Signed as exit 1A northbound; northbound exit for traffic entering SR 57 from SR 22 only; southbound entrance runs directly to SR 22 west
Orange	Orange	1.13	1.82	1E	Orangewood Avenue	Signed as exit 1B northbound; former SR 51
Orange	Anaheim	1.87	3.01	2	Katella Avenue	
Orange	Anaheim	2.75	4.43	3	Ball Road	
Orange	Anaheim	4.10	6.60	4	Lincoln Avenue	
Orange	Anaheim	4.71– 4.73	7.58– 7.61	5A	SR 91 east (Riverside Freeway) – Riverside	SR 91 east exit 30B, west exit 31
Orange	Anaheim	4.71– 4.73	7.58– 7.61	5B	SR 91 west (Riverside Freeway) – Los Angeles	SR 91 east exit 30B, west exit 31
Orange	Anaheim	4.71– 4.73	7.58– 7.61	♦	SR 91 west	HOV access only; southbound exit and northbound entrance
Orange	Placentia	5.72	9.21	6A	Orangethorpe Avenue	Signed as exit 6 southbound
Orange	Fullerton	6.57	10.57	6B	Chapman Avenue – Fullerton	Southbound exit is part of exit 7
Orange	Fullerton	6.90	11.10	7	Nutwood Avenue	
Orange	Fullerton	7.67	12.34	8	Yorba Linda Boulevard	
Orange	Fullerton–Brea line	9.18	14.77	9	SR 90 (Imperial Highway)	
Orange	Brea	10.21	16.43	10	Lambert Road	
Orange	Brea	11.11	17.88	11	Tonner Canyon Road	Northbound exit and southbound entrance
Los Angeles	Diamond Bar	12.64	20.34	13	Brea Canyon Road	Southbound exit and northbound entrance; former SR 57
Los Angeles	Diamond Bar	13.66	21.98	14	Diamond Bar Boulevard	
Los Angeles	Diamond Bar	14.90	23.98	15	Pathfinder Road	
Los Angeles	Diamond Bar–Industry line	15.89	25.57	16	SR 60 west (Pomona Freeway) – Los Angeles	Northbound signage and southbound entrance; SR 60 east exit 24A; provides direct exit onto Brea Canyon Road
Los Angeles	Diamond Bar–Industry line	15.89	25.57	—	SR 60 Alt. west / Brea Canyon Road	Southbound exit only
Los Angeles	Diamond Bar–Industry line	15.89	25.57	—	SR 60 west (Pomona Freeway) – Los Angeles	South end of SR 60 overlap; left southbound exit and northbound entrance
Los Angeles	Diamond Bar–Industry line			24B (Note: Exit number follows SR 60 rather than SR 57.)	Grand Avenue – Diamond Bar	
Los Angeles	Diamond Bar	16.33	26.28	—	SR 60 east (Pomona Freeway) – Pomona, Riverside	North end of SR 60 overlap; northbound exit and southbound entrance; southbound access is via exit 18; SR 57 north follows SR 60 east exit 25
Los Angeles	Diamond Bar	16.70	26.88	18	Sunset Crossing Road to SR 60 east (Pomona Freeway)	No northbound exit
Los Angeles	Pomona	19.80	31.87	20	Temple Avenue	
Los Angeles	Pomona–San Dimas line	21.11– 21.34	33.97– 34.34	22A	I-10 west (San Bernardino Freeway) – Los Angeles	Signed as exit 21 northbound; southern end of Kellogg Interchange; former eastern terminus of I-210; I-10 east exit 42A, west exit 42
Los Angeles	Pomona–San Dimas line	21.11– 21.34	33.97– 34.34	22B	I-10 east (San Bernardino Freeway) – San Bernardino	Signed as exit 21 northbound; southern end of Kellogg Interchange; former eastern terminus of I-210; I-10 east exit 42A, west exit 42
Los Angeles	San Dimas	21.58	34.73	22C	SR 71 south (Chino Valley Freeway) – Corona	Southbound exit and northbound entrance; northern end of Kellogg Interchange
Los Angeles	San Dimas	22.34	35.95	22D	Via Verde / Raging Waters Drive	Signed as exit 22 northbound
Los Angeles	San Dimas	23.90	38.46	24A	Covina Boulevard	
Los Angeles	San Dimas	24.42	39.30	24B	Arrow Highway	
Los Angeles	San Dimas–Glendora line	25.20	40.56	25A	Auto Centre Drive	Formerly Allen Avenue; northbound exit and southbound entrance
Los Angeles	Glendora	25.47	40.99	25B	SR 210 east (Foothill Freeway) – San Bernardino	Northern terminus of SR 57; I-210 east exit 44A, SR 210 west exit 45; former SR 30; future I-210 east
Los Angeles	Glendora	25.47	40.99	25C	I-210 west (Foothill Freeway) – Pasadena	Northern terminus of SR 57; I-210 east exit 44A, SR 210 west exit 45; former SR 30; future I-210 east
1.000 mi = 1.609 km; 1.000 km = 0.621 mi: Concurrency terminus; HOV only; Incomplete access
