= California State Route 60 =

State highway in California

State Route 60
- SR 60 highlighted in red

Route information
- Maintained by Caltrans
- Length: 76 mi (122 km) Includes 5.24 miles (8.39 km) on SR 57 and I-215
- Existed: 1964–present

Major junctions
- West end: I-5 / I-10 / US 101 in Los Angeles
- I-710 in East Los Angeles; I-605 in Industry; SR 57 in Diamond Bar; SR 71 in Pomona; I-15 in Jurupa Valley; I-215 / SR 91 in Riverside
- East end: I-10 in Beaumont

Location
- Country: United States
- State: California
- Counties: Los Angeles, San Bernardino, Riverside

Highway system
- State highways in California; Interstate; US; State; Scenic; History; Pre‑1964; Unconstructed; Deleted; Freeways
← SR 59	→ SR 61

State Route 60 (SR 60) is an east–west state highway in the U.S. state of California. It serves the cities and communities on the eastern side of the Los Angeles metropolitan area and runs along the south side of the San Gabriel Valley. It functions as a bypass route of Interstate 10 (I-10) through the area between the East Los Angeles Interchange in Los Angeles and Beaumont. SR 60 provides a route across several spurs of the Peninsular Ranges, linking the Los Angeles Basin with the Pomona Valley and San Gabriel Valley. The highway also runs concurrently with SR 57 and I-215. Portions of SR 60 are designated as either the Pomona Freeway or the Moreno Valley Freeway. SR 60 is also known colloquially as "the 60" to Southern California residents.

== Route description ==
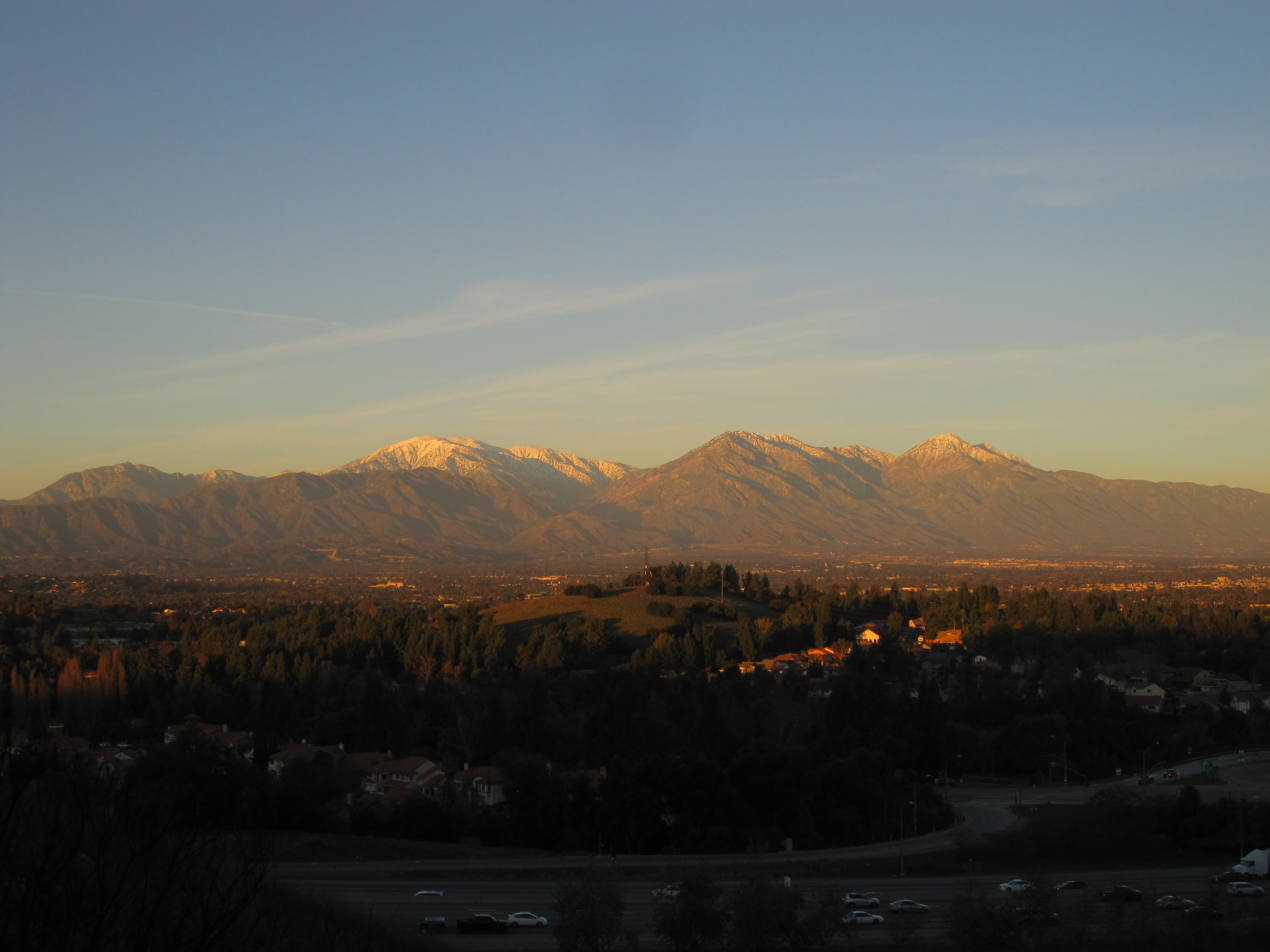
Pomona Freeway in the foreground, with Phillips Ranch, and Mt. San Antonio in the background

Route 60 is defined in section 360 of the California Streets and Highways Code. The definition omits the concurrency with Route 215 instead of duplicating that segment in the other route's definition in the code:

Route 60 is from:
(a) Route 10 near the Los Angeles River in Los Angeles to Route 215 in Riverside via Pomona.
(b) Route 215 near Moreno Valley to Route 10 near Beaumont.

SR 60 begins at the East Los Angeles Interchange near Downtown Los Angeles, designated as the Pomona Freeway. The freeway heads east from the junction after splitting off from I-10 (Santa Monica Freeway) and passes through East Los Angeles, where it has a four level interchange with I-710 (Long Beach Freeway). Continuing east through the southern San Gabriel Valley, SR 60 passes through many cities and communities, intersecting I-605 (San Gabriel River Freeway) in the City of Industry. It proceeds to overlap with SR 57 (Orange Freeway) in Diamond Bar, right on the edge of the San Gabriel Valley.

A short overlap carries SR 60 traffic on the same roadway as SR 57. The two routes head northeast through an arm of the San Gabriel Valley; after they split, SR 60 ascends slightly and then slopes through the Puente Hills and into the Pomona Valley. Continuing east, SR 60 intersects the Chino Valley Freeway (SR 71) in Pomona, I-15 (Ontario Freeway) in Jurupa Valley, and the Riverside Freeway (SR 91/I-215) in Riverside, California.

Another short overlap carries SR 60 traffic on the same roadway as I-215. The two routes head southeast; after the two freeways split, SR 60 is designated the Moreno Valley Freeway. The freeway runs through communities further east in the Inland Empire. After passing through Moreno Valley, SR 60 runs through the rugged hill country to the east (known as the Badlands to the locals). After that, SR 60 downgrades to an expressway and has several at-grade interchanges with local roads. Finally, in Beaumont, SR 60 ends and merges into I-10 (Christopher Columbus Transcontinental Highway).

SR 60 traverses Los Angeles, San Bernardino, and Riverside counties. As it passes through many of Los Angeles' eastern suburbs in southern San Gabriel and Pomona valleys, it is a major transportation corridor. For the majority of its length, it is generally parallel to, and south of, the San Bernardino Freeway, I-10, and generally parallel to and north of the Riverside Freeway, SR 91. The rapid population growth exacerbates traffic congestion and, therefore, residential, commercial, and industrial development in the Inland Empire. In particular, it has become increasingly clogged of late with shipping container-laden trucks traveling from the ports of Los Angeles and Long Beach to rail yards and warehouses in the Inland Empire. As a result of the rapid development of the Inland Empire since the 1980s, the Moreno Valley Freeway now suffers from severe traffic congestion. In the mid-2000s, the northwestern section concurrently signed with Interstate 215 underwent significant construction to improve traffic flow, but it still suffers from heavy congestion.

The freeway is known as the Pomona Freeway from its western terminus to its junction with SR 91 and I-215 in Riverside, and the Moreno Valley Freeway east of this interchange until its eastern terminus at its junction with I-10. The route is part of the California Freeway and Expressway System, and is part of the National Highway System, a network of highways that are considered essential to the country's economy, defense, and mobility by the Federal Highway Administration.

== History ==
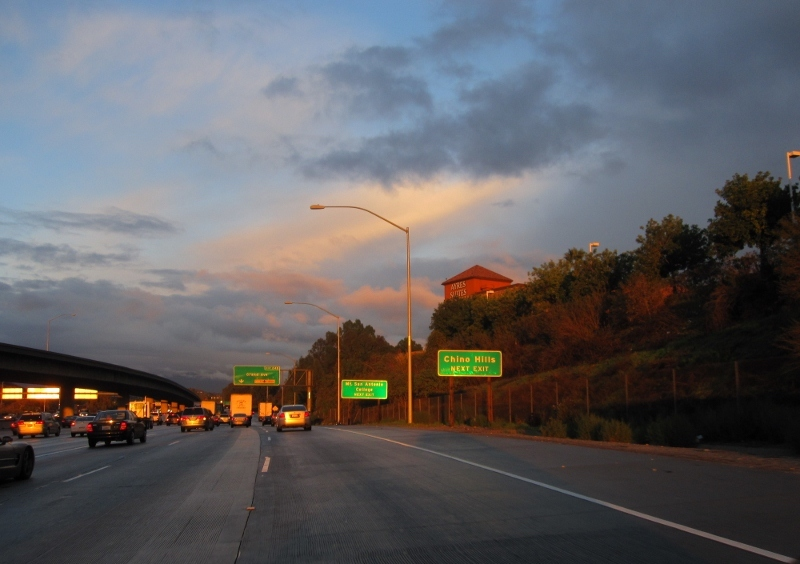
Pomona Freeway eastbound and SR 57 northbound Interchange, with Grand Ave. exit (exit 24B) for Mt. San Antonio College, Chino Hills, and Diamond Bar visible

The route takes its number from former US 60, which now begins near Brenda, Arizona, and terminates on the east coast at Virginia Beach, Virginia. Before 1964, US 60 ran from Los Angeles to the Arizona state line, where it continued its nationwide trek, often overlapping US 99 and US 70 along the way. The advent of I-10 created a situation where, at one point, four different signed roads were routed along the state-maintained highway.

In 1964, California implemented a plan to simplify its highway-numbering system, where one state highway had only one route number, and concurrencies were strongly discouraged. As a result, the US 60 designations (along with US 70 and US 99) were removed. I-10 (as Route 10) superseded US 60's alignment from Beaumont to the Arizona state line, even though the routing was only partly a freeway. This left the officially designated Route 60 from Beaumont to Los Angeles orphaned from its original U.S. Highway (which to this day begins at a point on I-10 several miles east of Quartzsite, Arizona). This new Route 60 was provisionally signed as a U.S. Highway since the designation would guide motorists from Los Angeles to Arizona without a completed freeway for I-10; when all of Route 10 was upgraded to a freeway, the U.S. Highway designation disappeared.

At least two California highway signs managed to be overlooked for many years afterward. Along eastbound I-10 at the eastern end of the San Gorgonio Pass, US 60 was co-signed with I-10 on the eastbound overhead signage with Indio as the control city at the junction with SR 111. The signage remained as late as 1979 and had appeared in early scenes of the 1980 movie American Gigolo where Julian Kay (played by Richard Gere) is en route to Palm Springs on a "substitute" assignment. Replacement overhead signs now have only I-10 with "Indio, other Desert Cities" as the control cities. Another sign on Hess Boulevard at SR 62 in the unincorporated town of Morongo Valley pointed not to I-10, but to US 60 (with evidence of the sign having pointed to both US 70 and US 99 as well) stood through the early 2000s; it has since been removed.

The stretch of SR 60 along the Moreno Valley Freeway made national headlines in April 2004, when five-year-old Ruby Bustamante of Indio and her 26-year-old mother, Norma, were reported missing. Their car had left the road, apparently unwitnessed, between the gap in two guard rails on April 4. It then crashed underneath a tree in a deep ravine. Though Mrs. Bustamante died, presumably at the moment of impact, Ruby survived on her own for ten days on cups of uncooked Top Ramen noodles and bottles of Gatorade that were in the car.

In 1998, the HOV lanes between SR 57 and I-15 opened. In 2005, construction of an HOV lane started between I-605 and Redlands Boulevard in two phases. The construction was finished in 2010 from I-605 to SR 57, and in 2008 from I-15 to Redlands Boulevard. The Grand Avenue (exit 24B) interchange went through some significant construction during this period, which included adding a direct HOV connector to SR 57 and an alternate route for SR 60 west to exit Brea Canyon Road (exit 23). There are no current plans to construct the HOV lanes from I-605 to the East Los Angeles Interchange or Redlands Boulevard to I-10.

On December 14, 2011, a tanker truck carrying 8,800 US gallons (33,000 L) of gasoline caught fire and exploded on the Pomona Freeway in Montebello; this caused Caltrans to rebuild the Paramount Boulevard overpass. Shortly after the rebuilding of the bridge, Caltrans did widening work on Paramount Boulevard's exit and entrance ramps to accommodate the new bridge and installed new traffic signals. There is also a connection to the Monterey Park Market Place via Neil Armstrong Street, a joint venture between Monterey Park and Montebello, which can be accessed through Paramount Boulevard.

In mid-2016, Caltrans started constructing a partial interchange at Lemon Avenue (to Brea Canyon Road) with no westbound exit. On May 1, 2018, the Lemon Avenue eastbound off-ramp exit and westbound on-ramp were opened, and the eastbound off-ramp exit to Brea Canyon Road was removed. The project was finished in late 2018.

In 2020, Caltrans conducted a freeway rehabilitation project on the freeway from I-710 to I-605. The construction took two years and replaced the deteriorating concrete with new concrete. Construction started in 2020 and finished in 2022. Since the freeway was rehabilitated in sections, the entire median had to be replaced. In addition, as part of this project, Caltrans replaced the freeway signs with retro-reflective ones from the East LA interchange to Fairway Drive. All freeway signs in the median were replaced with new ones on the right hand side. Signs between Fairway Drive and the San Bernardino-Los Angeles county line will be replaced once the widening work on SR 57 is complete.

To increase safety through the Badlands corridor between Moreno Valley and Beaumont, the Riverside County Transportation Commission (RCTC) partnered with Caltrans to complete a $138 million project to add a truck climbing lane in both directions at Gilman Springs Road and Jack Rabbit Trail. Construction began in the summer of 2019 and was completed in May 2022.

== Future ==
Construction on the SR 57/SR 60 Interchange Improvements Project in the area around the SR 57/SR 60 overlap began in 2023 and is scheduled to be completed in 2028. The project will add an eastbound bypass lane between SR 57 southbound and Grand Avenue and between SR 57 northbound and Diamond Bar Boulevard. In addition, the Grand Avenue bridge is planned to be replaced with a wider bridge, and the eastbound off ramp will be redesigned. This is to affect the Diamond Bar Golf Course, which has been closed since 2021 to accommodate the freeway expansion. The widening of SR 60 westbound has already been completed. The westbound freeway previously went through a major widening in 2006 and the Grand Avenue/SR 60 westbound interchange had further improvements finished in 2019.

The I-605 Corridor Improvement Project includes plans to reconstruct the SR 60/I-605 interchange. As of January 2024, the project is still going through the approval process.

A groundbreaking ceremony was held for the future Potrero Boulevard interchange near the Jack Rabbit Trail exit of SR 60 on February 1, 2018. There are also plans to convert SR 60 from the Jack Rabbit trail exit to its eastern terminus (I-10) to a full freeway. If this segment is complete, the entire route will be up to Interstate standards. These plans are still only in the environmental phase and have not been approved yet.

== Exit list ==
Except where prefixed with a letter, postmiles were measured on the road as it was in 1964, based on the alignment that existed at the time, and do not necessarily reflect current mileage. Postmile prefixes include: R reflecting a realignment in the route since then, M indicating a second realignment, L referring to an overlap due to a correction or change, and T indicating postmiles classified as temporary. Segments that remain unconstructed or have been relinquished to local control may be omitted. The numbers reset at county lines; the start and end postmiles in each county are given in the county column.

County	Location	Postmile	Exit	Destinations	Notes
Los Angeles; LA 0.00-R30.46	Los Angeles	0.00	1A	I-10 west (Santa Monica Freeway) – Santa Monica	Westbound exit and eastbound entrance; access to I-10 east is via exit 1E; western end of SR 60/Pomona Freeway and the East Los Angeles Interchange; I-10 east exit 16B
Los Angeles; LA 0.00-R30.46	Los Angeles	0.04	1B	Santa Fe Avenue, Mateo Street	Westbound exit and eastbound entrance
Los Angeles; LA 0.00-R30.46	Los Angeles	R0.55	1A	I-5 south (Santa Ana Freeway) – Santa Ana	Eastbound exit from I-10 only; I-5 north exit 134A heads directly to I-10 west
Los Angeles; LA 0.00-R30.46	Los Angeles	R0.55	1C	US 101 north (Santa Ana Freeway) – Los Angeles	Westbound exit and eastbound entrance
Los Angeles; LA 0.00-R30.46	Los Angeles	R0.55	1D	Soto Street	Eastbound access via I-5 south or US 101 south; westbound entrance heads directly to I-10 west
Los Angeles; LA 0.00-R30.46	Los Angeles	R0.55	1E	I-5 north (Golden State Freeway north, I-10 east) – Sacramento	Westbound exit and eastbound entrance; eastern end of East Los Angeles Interchange; I-5 south exit 134B
Los Angeles; LA 0.00-R30.46	Los Angeles	R1.48	1D	Whittier Boulevard, Lorena Street	Signed as exit 1B eastbound; Whittier Boulevard was former US 101
Los Angeles; LA 0.00-R30.46	Los Angeles–East Los Angeles line	R1.94	2	Indiana Street	Westbound exit and eastbound entrance
Los Angeles; LA 0.00-R30.46	East Los Angeles	R2.59	3A	Downey Road	
Los Angeles; LA 0.00-R30.46	East Los Angeles	R3.27	3B	I-710 (Long Beach Freeway) / Valley Boulevard – Long Beach	I-710 north exit 20A, south exit 20B
Los Angeles; LA 0.00-R30.46	Monterey Park	R4.43	4	Atlantic Boulevard	
Los Angeles; LA 0.00-R30.46	Monterey Park–Montebello line	R5.16	6A	Findlay Avenue	Eastbound exit and westbound entrance
Los Angeles; LA 0.00-R30.46	Monterey Park–Montebello line	R5.89	6B	Garfield Avenue, Wilcox Avenue	Signed as exit 6 westbound
Los Angeles; LA 0.00-R30.46	Montebello	R7.77	8	Paramount Boulevard	
Los Angeles; LA 0.00-R30.46	Rosemead	R8.55	9	San Gabriel Boulevard	
Los Angeles; LA 0.00-R30.46		9.51	10A	SR 19 (Rosemead Boulevard)	
Los Angeles; LA 0.00-R30.46	South El Monte	10.23	10B	Santa Anita Avenue	
Los Angeles; LA 0.00-R30.46	South El Monte	11.01	11	Peck Road	
Los Angeles; LA 0.00-R30.46	Industry	11.71	12	I-605 (San Gabriel River Freeway)	I-605 exit 19
Los Angeles; LA 0.00-R30.46	Industry	12.63	13	Crossroads Parkway	
Los Angeles; LA 0.00-R30.46	Hacienda Heights	14.26	14	Seventh Avenue	Signed as exits 14A (south) and 14B (north) eastbound
Los Angeles; LA 0.00-R30.46	Hacienda Heights	15.93	16	Hacienda Boulevard	Former SR 39
Los Angeles; LA 0.00-R30.46	Industry–Hacienda Heights line	17.97	18	Azusa Avenue (CR N8)	Proposed route of future SR 39
Los Angeles; LA 0.00-R30.46	Rowland Heights–Industry line	19.46	19	Fullerton Road	
Los Angeles; LA 0.00-R30.46	Rowland Heights–Industry line	20.43	20	Nogales Street	
Los Angeles; LA 0.00-R30.46	Industry	R21.48	21	Fairway Drive	
Los Angeles; LA 0.00-R30.46	Diamond Bar	22.39	22	Lemon Avenue to Brea Canyon Road	No westbound exit; interchange added in 2018
Los Angeles; LA 0.00-R30.46	Diamond Bar	R22.97	23	Brea Canyon Road	Westbound entrance only; westbound exit removed in 2006; eastbound exit and entrance removed on May 1, 2018; westbound access via SR 57 and SR 60 Alt. west
Los Angeles; LA 0.00-R30.46	Diamond Bar	R22.97	—	SR 60 Alt. west ends	Westbound entrance only
Los Angeles; LA 0.00-R30.46	Diamond Bar–Industry line	R23.56	24A	SR 57 south (Orange Freeway) – Santa Ana	Eastbound signage; SR 57 north exit 16
Los Angeles; LA 0.00-R30.46	Diamond Bar–Industry line	R23.56	—	SR 57 south (Orange Freeway) / SR 60 Alt. west / Brea Canyon Road – Santa Ana	Western end of SR 57 overlap; westbound signage
Los Angeles; LA 0.00-R30.46	Diamond Bar–Industry line		♦	SR 57 south	HOV access only; westbound exit and eastbound entrance
Los Angeles; LA 0.00-R30.46	Diamond Bar–Industry line	R24.45	24B	Grand Avenue	
Los Angeles; LA 0.00-R30.46	Diamond Bar	R25.46	25	SR 57 north (Orange Freeway)	Eastern end of SR 57 overlap; eastbound exit and westbound entrance; westbound access is via exit 26
Los Angeles; LA 0.00-R30.46	Diamond Bar	R25.56	26	Diamond Bar Boulevard to SR 57 north	"To SR 57" not signed eastbound
Los Angeles; LA 0.00-R30.46	Pomona	R28.04	28	Phillips Ranch Road	
Los Angeles; LA 0.00-R30.46	Pomona	R29.39	29A	Garey Avenue to SR 71 north (Chino Valley Freeway)	Signed as exit 29B eastbound; "To SR 71" not signed westbound
Los Angeles; LA 0.00-R30.46	Pomona	R29.39	29B	SR 71 south (Chino Valley Freeway) – Corona	Signed as exit 29A eastbound; SR 71 north exit 12B
Los Angeles; LA 0.00-R30.46	Pomona	R29.39	29B	SR 71 north (Chino Valley Freeway) – Pomona	Westbound exit and eastbound entrance; eastbound exit is via exit 29B; exit also included direct access to Rio Rancho Road; SR 71 south exit 12
Los Angeles; LA 0.00-R30.46	Pomona	R30.33	30	Reservoir Street	
San Bernardino; SBD R0.00-R9.96	Chino	R1.37	32	Ramona Avenue	
San Bernardino; SBD R0.00-R9.96	Chino	R2.37	33	Central Avenue	
San Bernardino; SBD R0.00-R9.96	Chino–Ontario line	R3.60	34	Mountain Avenue	
San Bernardino; SBD R0.00-R9.96	Ontario	R4.58	35	SR 83 (Euclid Avenue)	
San Bernardino; SBD R0.00-R9.96	Ontario	R5.86	36	Grove Avenue – Ontario Airport	
San Bernardino; SBD R0.00-R9.96	Ontario	R6.86	37	Vineyard Avenue	
San Bernardino; SBD R0.00-R9.96	Ontario	R7.87	38	Archibald Avenue	
San Bernardino; SBD R0.00-R9.96	Ontario	R8.91	39	Haven Avenue – Ontario Airport	
San Bernardino–Riverside county line	Ontario–Eastvale line	R9.96	41A	Milliken Avenue, Hamner Avenue	Signed as exit 40 eastbound; former SR 31
Riverside; RIV R0.00-30.50	Eastvale–Jurupa Valley line	R0.49	41B	I-15 (Ontario Freeway) – Barstow, San Diego	Signed as exit 41 eastbound; I-15 exit 106A-B
Riverside; RIV R0.00-30.50	Jurupa Valley	R1.99	42	Van Buren Boulevard, Etiwanda Avenue, Mission Boulevard	
Riverside; RIV R0.00-30.50	Jurupa Valley	R3.03	43	Country Village Road, Mission Boulevard	
Riverside; RIV R0.00-30.50	Jurupa Valley	R4.55	45	Pedley Road	
Riverside; RIV R0.00-30.50	Jurupa Valley	R5.58	46	Pyrite Street	
Riverside; RIV R0.00-30.50	Jurupa Valley	7.53	48	Valley Way, Mission Boulevard	
Riverside; RIV R0.00-30.50	Jurupa Valley	9.56	50	Rubidoux Boulevard	
Riverside; RIV R0.00-30.50	Riverside	11.07	52A	Market Street – Downtown Riverside	
Riverside; RIV R0.00-30.50	Riverside	11.73	52B	Main Street	Former US 91 / US 395
Riverside; RIV R0.00-30.50	Riverside	R12.06	53A	SR 91 west (Riverside Freeway) – Riverside, Beach Cities	Signed as exit 34B westbound; former US 91 south; eastern end of Pomona Freeway; SR 91 east exits 65B-C
Riverside; RIV R0.00-30.50	Riverside	R12.21 43.27 (Note: Indicates that the postmile represents the distance along I-215 rather than SR 60.)	53B	I-215 north (Riverside Freeway) – San Bernardino, Barstow	Western end of I-215 overlap; SR 60 west follows I-215 north exit 34C; former I-15E north / US 91 north / US 395 north
Riverside; RIV R0.00-30.50	Riverside	42.84	34A (Note: Exit numbers follow I-215 rather than SR 60.)	Spruce Street	Closed
Riverside; RIV R0.00-30.50	Riverside	42.16	33	3rd Street, Blaine Street	
Riverside; RIV R0.00-30.50	Riverside	41.49	32	University Avenue	Former US 395
Riverside; RIV R0.00-30.50	Riverside	40.98	31	Martin Luther King Boulevard	
Riverside; RIV R0.00-30.50	Riverside	40.28	31	El Cerrito Drive	Closed
Riverside; RIV R0.00-30.50	Riverside	39.48	30B	Watkins Drive, Central Avenue	
Riverside; RIV R0.00-30.50	Riverside	R38.92	30A	Fair Isle Drive – Box Springs	Westbound exit from SR 60 before merging with I-215 north; no direct access from I-215 north
Riverside; RIV R0.00-30.50	Riverside	R38.34 R12.21	58	I-215 south (Escondido Freeway) – San Diego	Eastern end of I-215 overlap; western end of Moreno Valley Freeway; SR 60 east follows I-215 south exit 29; former I-15E south / US 395 south
Riverside; RIV R0.00-30.50	Riverside–Moreno Valley line	13.31	59	Day Street	
Riverside; RIV R0.00-30.50	Moreno Valley	14.32	60	Frederick Street, Pigeon Pass Road	To SR 60 Business, former US 60 east
Riverside; RIV R0.00-30.50	Moreno Valley	15.34	61	Heacock Street	
Riverside; RIV R0.00-30.50	Moreno Valley	16.35	62	Perris Boulevard	
Riverside; RIV R0.00-30.50	Moreno Valley	18.37	64	Nason Street	
Riverside; RIV R0.00-30.50	Moreno Valley	19.20	65	Moreno Beach Drive	
Riverside; RIV R0.00-30.50	Moreno Valley	20.37	66	Redlands Boulevard	
Riverside; RIV R0.00-30.50	Moreno Valley	21.37	67	World Logistics Center Parkway	Formerly Theodore Street
Riverside; RIV R0.00-30.50	Moreno Valley	22.10	68	Hemet, San Jacinto	Eastbound signage; former SR 177
Riverside; RIV R0.00-30.50	Moreno Valley	22.10	68	Gilman Springs Road	Westbound signage; former SR 177
Riverside; RIV R0.00-30.50	Beaumont	27.98	74	Jack Rabbit Trail	Signed as exit 74A eastbound; Eastern end of freeway; at-grade intersection westbound and interchange eastbound
Riverside; RIV R0.00-30.50	Beaumont		75	Potrero Boulevard	Future interchange
Riverside; RIV R0.00-30.50	Beaumont			Western Knolls Avenue	At-grade intersection; western end of freeway
Riverside; RIV R0.00-30.50	Beaumont	30.50	93	6th Street – Beaumont	Eastbound exit and westbound entrance; exit number follows I-10; connects to I-10 west
Riverside; RIV R0.00-30.50	Beaumont	30.50		I-10 east – Indio	No direct access to I-10 west; eastern end of SR 60/Moreno Valley Freeway; I-10 exit 93
1.000 mi = 1.609 km; 1.000 km = 0.621 mi: Closed/former; Concurrency terminus; HOV only; Incomplete access; Unopened
