= Kellogg Interchange =

Interchange in California

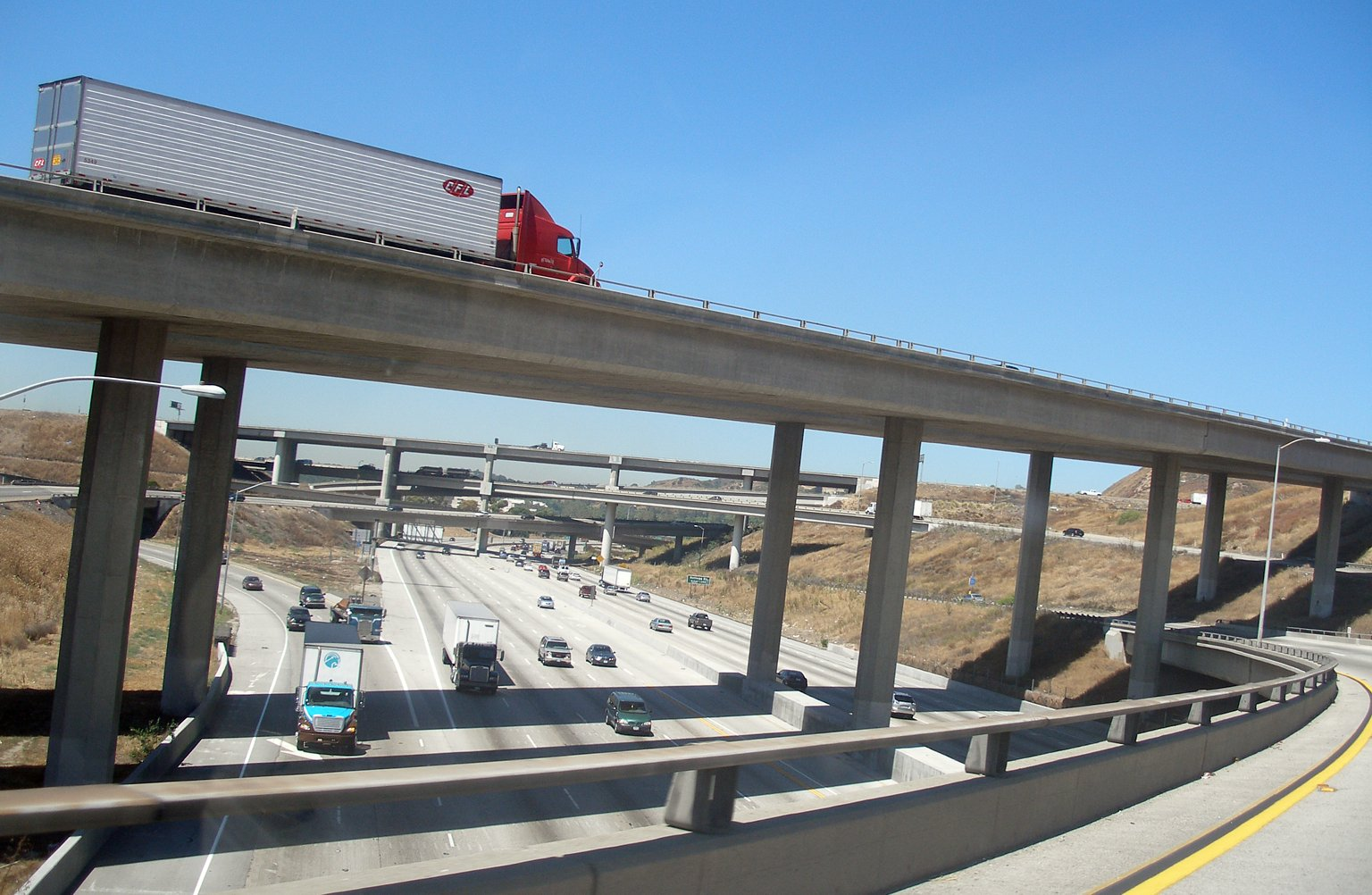
- The Kellogg Interchange as seen from the transition ramp connecting the northbound Chino Valley Freeway (SR 71) to the westbound San Bernardino Freeway (I-10).
- Interactive map of Kellogg Interchange

Location
- Pomona–San Dimas line, California
- Coordinates: 34°03′59″N 117°48′22″W
- Roads at junction: I-10; SR 57; SR 71

Construction
- Maintained by: Caltrans

The Kellogg Interchange complex is a freeway interchange in Southern California, connecting the San Bernardino (Interstate 10), Orange (State Route 57), and Chino Valley (State Route 71) freeways. The interchange is located at the boundary between the cities of San Dimas and Pomona about 25 miles (40 km) east of downtown Los Angeles. It is named for the nearby W. K. Kellogg Ranch, now home to Cal Poly Pomona.

== Description ==
The interchange comprises five freeway segments (i.e. there are five freeway 'paths' of travel into the complex). The three freeways that intersect here are I-10 (San Bernardino Freeway), SR 57 (Orange Freeway), and SR 71 (Chino Valley Freeway), though not all traffic movements are accommodated: from 57 North, 71 South is not available; from 71 North, 10 East and 57 South are not available, and from 10 West, 71 South is not available.

Occasionally Kellogg Hill is used to describe the interchange; however, most traffic reporters properly describe Kellogg Hill as the actual hill that the San Bernardino Freeway climbs between West Covina and the Kellogg Interchange. This hill is often backed up due to slow trucks, especially on the westbound side where there is no additional truck lane. The crest of the hill is near the Via Verde onramp in San Dimas.

== History ==
Until 2002, Interstate 210 connected with the Kellogg Interchange; that section of the 210 north of the interchange no longer exists as it has been resigned as State Route 57.

Generally, transitioning from one freeway to another is efficient and safe because at the time of the interchange's construction, it was not encumbered by existing, surrounding development in the immediate vicinity. Therefore, freeway alignments are straight and the transition roads that connect them have predictable, constant radii.
