= Valley Boulevard =

Road in Southern California, United States

- Maintained by: Local jurisdictions
- West end: Main Street / Mission Road in Lincoln Heights, Los Angeles
- Major junctions: I-710 in Alhambra; I-605 in Industry; SR 71 in Pomona; I-10 in Ontario; Gap in route; I-10 in Fontana; I-10 in Colton
- East end: Sperry Drive in Colton

Valley Boulevard is a street in Southern California, running east from Los Angeles to Pomona, where it becomes Holt Avenue, and a continuation from Fontana to Colton. It generally parallels Interstate 10 (I-10) and State Route 60 (CA 60), and is the original alignment of U.S. Route 60 (US 60). The present north end of I-710 is at Valley Boulevard in Los Angeles, just west of Alhambra.

== Route description ==
The road begins northeast of downtown Los Angeles at the intersection of North Main Street and North Mission Road, passing through the University Hills district at the northernmost edge of the Cal State LA campus and then through Alhambra. It ends at the interchange with CA 71 in Pomona, continuing east through Pomona as Holt Avenue and entering Montclair as Holt Boulevard. Portions of the boulevard are also part of El Camino Real.

After Holt Boulevard passes through Ontario, it merges with I-10; a few miles eastward from there, another piece of Valley Boulevard splits from I-10 in Fontana, running through Rialto to I-10 in eastern Colton. When the old alignment next splits, in San Bernardino, it is known as Redlands Boulevard.

For most of its length, Valley Boulevard runs parallel to the Union Pacific (formerly Southern Pacific) Railroad.

== Description ==
Valley Boulevard (former US 60, US 70, and US 99) is a vital and growing professional and business sector that includes many Asian markets, eateries and other service-oriented businesses such as physicians and dentists. There are multiple Asian banks and Asian owned and operated enterprises that accommodate the burgeoning Asian population.

The Asian communities in the San Gabriel Valley follow along a 25-mile (40 km) stretch of Valley Boulevard covering the entire length of the San Gabriel Valley with Alhambra on the west side and Diamond Bar on the east side. Asian communities in the San Gabriel Valley extend as far north as San Marino and Arcadia and as far south as Hacienda Heights and Rowland Heights.

Valley Boulevard begins at Lincoln Park, off North Main Street near downtown Los Angeles, about a mile northeast of the downtown Los Angeles Chinatown. From North Main Street, Valley runs east along a five-mile (8 km) stretch including large industrial tracts and the largely Hispanic community of Lincoln Heights. Midway between downtown Chinatown to the west and the start of the ethnic Chinese suburbs to the east is the Ming Ya Buddhist Foundation, on Valley Boulevard in Lincoln Heights.

From Los Angeles, Valley Boulevard enters Alhambra, the "Gateway to the San Gabriel Valley". Alhambra, which is 47% Asian according to the 2000 census, has a large number of Asian businesses along Valley Boulevard. Alhambra's Valley Boulevard boasts numerous noodle shops, Asian cafés and the original Sam Woo Barbecue restaurant. The artful Wing Lung Bank features the largest glass tile mural in North America, composed of 996,000 3/4" glass tiles. Each year, Alhambra and San Gabriel host one of the largest Lunar Chinese New Year celebrations in the country which includes a parade along Valley Boulevard.

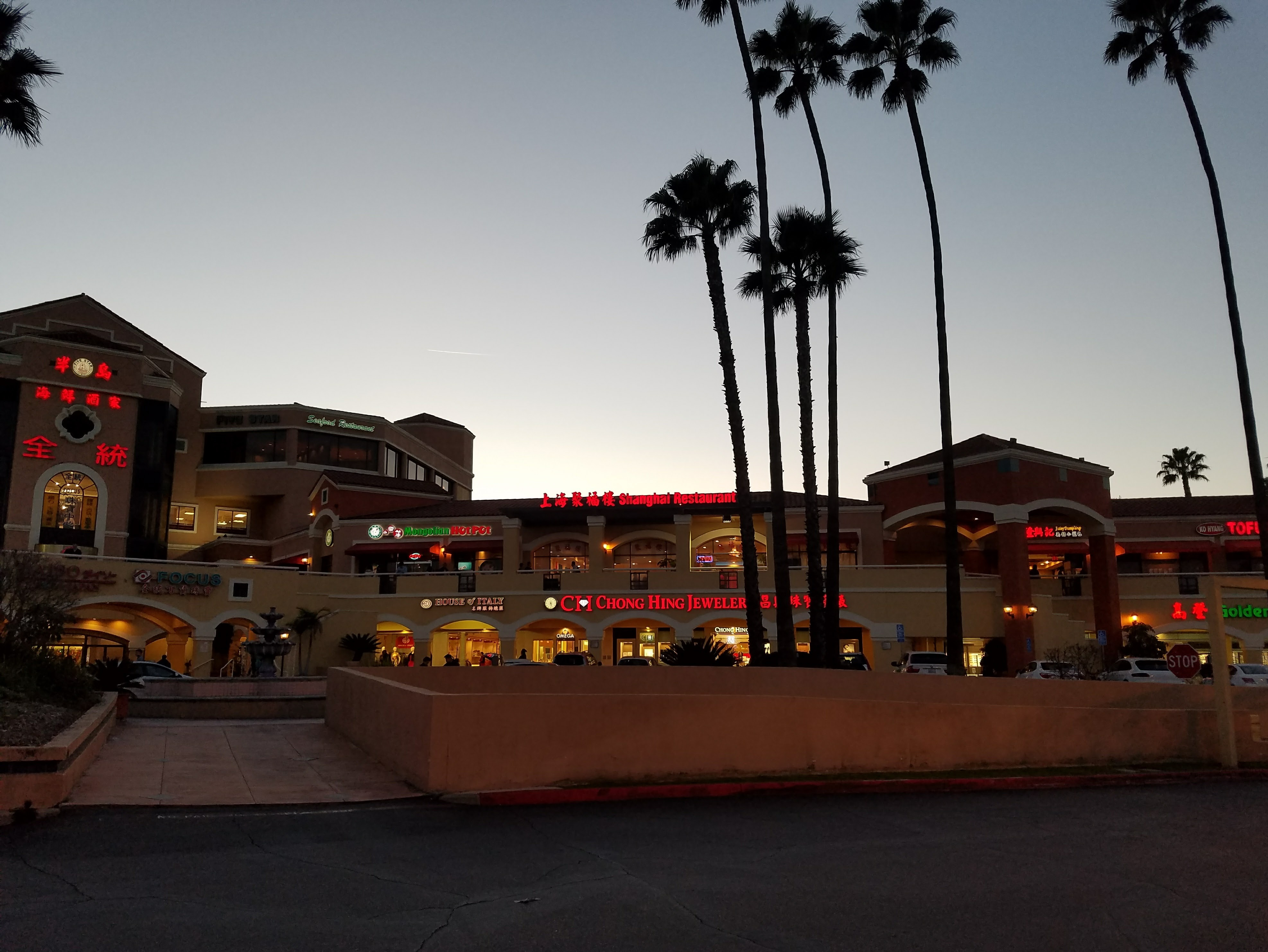
San Gabriel Square

Continuing east from Alhambra along Valley Boulevard are the cities of San Gabriel and Rosemead with San Marino, Temple City and Arcadia being further north and east. These five cities have Asian populations between 40 and 55% with a large number of Asian businesses in their various town centers. Along Valley Boulevard in San Gabriel are dozens of Asian mini-malls and hundreds of shops and restaurants. San Gabriel Square is one of the most prominent and features a 99 Ranch Market, several shops and restaurants including specialties such as Taiwanese and Vegetarian food. Valley Boulevard in San Gabriel also includes the comprehensive San Gabriel Superstore which includes multiple vendors anchored by a large grocery store.

Continuing east from Rosemead further along Valley are the largely Hispanic communities of El Monte and La Puente and large industrial tracts, including those that dominate the City of Industry. This ten-mile-long (16 km), largely industrial corridor includes many Asian owned wholesale businesses, including importers of electronics, food and furniture from Asia. North of La Puente is West Covina which is 26% Asian and south of La Puente is Hacienda Heights which is 36% Asian Hacienda Heights is home to the Hsi Lai Temple, the largest Buddhist temple in the United States. The temple encompasses 15 acres (61,000 m^{2}) and a floor area of 102,432 sq ft (9,516.2 m^{2}). The temple's Ming Dynasty (1368–1644 AD) and Qing Dynasty (1644–1911 AD) architecture is faithful to the traditional style of buildings, Chinese gardens, and statuary of ancient Chinese monasteries. Hsi Lai was built to serve as a spiritual and cultural center for those interested in learning Buddhism and Chinese culture.

On the east side of the San Gabriel Valley, before Valley Boulevard becomes Holt Avenue in Pomona, are the communities of Rowland Heights, Walnut and Diamond Bar. These three communities each have Asian populations of between 50 and 60%. Rowland Heights offers its own mini ethnic suburbia, including the businesses lining Colima Road (about one mile (1.6 km) south of Valley), Fullerton Road and Nogales Street. Indoor malls in Rowland Heights feature fine restaurants and chic Asian boutiques.

== History ==
Several old alignments are present:

- In downtown El Monte, the old road is now Valley Mall; a new alignment has been built a block to the north.
- A road named Old Valley Boulevard exists in La Puente, where the new alignment crosses over a railroad on a bridge. The old road originally crossed near Unruh Avenue, and later moved to Hacienda Boulevard.
- The road originally crossed the railroads in western Pomona via Pomona Boulevard, present CA 71 and 2nd Street into downtown Pomona.

The road was once known as Main Street between El Monte and La Puente and Pomona Boulevard between La Puente and Pomona. Main Street became Valley Boulevard between 1933 and 1942, and Pomona Boulevard was renamed (except for the old section in Pomona) by 1959.

When US 60 was first extended to Los Angeles ca. 1932, it ran along Valley Boulevard. The new alignment (Ramona Boulevard and Garvey Avenue, now partly the San Bernardino Freeway) was built ca. 1934, taking US 60 off Valley Boulevard. Pre-1964 Legislative Route 77 was defined in 1931 to run from downtown Los Angeles to Pomona along Valley Boulevard, and then to continue east to Riverside and south to San Diego. The part from the east city limit of Los Angeles (just east of the north end of CA 7, now I-710) to I-10 in El Monte was assigned the State Route 212 number in the 1964 renumbering, and in 1965 it was removed from the state highway system.

Bus service from Downtown Los Angeles to El Monte is served by Metro Local line 76. Bus service east of El Monte is served by Foothill Transit line 194.

== Major intersections ==
County	Location	mi	km	Destinations	Notes
Los Angeles	Los Angeles			Main Street / Mission Road	Western terminus
Los Angeles	Los Angeles			Soto Street	
Los Angeles	Alhambra			I-710 south (Long Beach Freeway) to I-10 – Long Beach	I-710 north exit 23; traffic exits northbound.
Los Angeles	Rosemead			SR 19 (Rosemead Boulevard)	Former SR 164
Los Angeles	El Monte			I-10 (San Bernardino Freeway) – Los Angeles, San Bernardino	I-10 exit 29B
Los Angeles	El Monte			I-605 (San Gabriel River Freeway)	I-605 exit 21
Los Angeles	City of Industry–La Puente line			Hacienda Boulevard	Former SR 39
Los Angeles	City of Industry–La Puente line			CR N8 (Azusa Avenue)	
Los Angeles	Pomona			SR 71 (Chino Valley Freeway / I-10 Bus. west) – Los Angeles, Pasadena, Corona	Western end of I-10 Bus. concurrency; SR 71 exit 14A; Valley Boulevard becomes Holt Avenue and Holt Boulevard.
San Bernardino	Ontario			SR 83 (Euclid Avenue)	
San Bernardino	Ontario			I-10 east (San Bernardino Freeway) – San Bernardino	Western end of I-10 concurrency; eastbound exit and westbound entrance; I-10 west exit 55A
San Bernardino	Gap in route				
San Bernardino	Fontana			I-10 (San Bernardino Freeway) – San Bernardino, Los Angeles	Eastern end of I-10 concurrency; I-10 exit 59
San Bernardino	Colton			I-10 (San Bernardino Freeway) to I-215 / Mt. Vernon Avenue – Los Angeles, Redlands, Indio	Eastern end of I-10 Bus. concurrency; I-10 exit 71
San Bernardino	Colton			Sperry Drive	Eastern terminus
1.000 mi = 1.609 km; 1.000 km = 0.621 mi

== Landmarks ==
- Asian businesses in the San Gabriel Valley follow along a 25-mile (40 km) stretch covering the entire length of the valley.
- Garfield Theater (Alhambra, California)
- Gateway Plaza Monument (Alhambra)
- The Hat sign (Valley Boulevard and Garfield Avenue)
- 4351 Valley Boulevard, Los Angeles, Office originally built in 1930 for 60,000 SF warehouse in their back lot, now USC Facility office (Los Angeles)
