= Diamond Bar, California =

City in Los Angeles County, California, US

- City
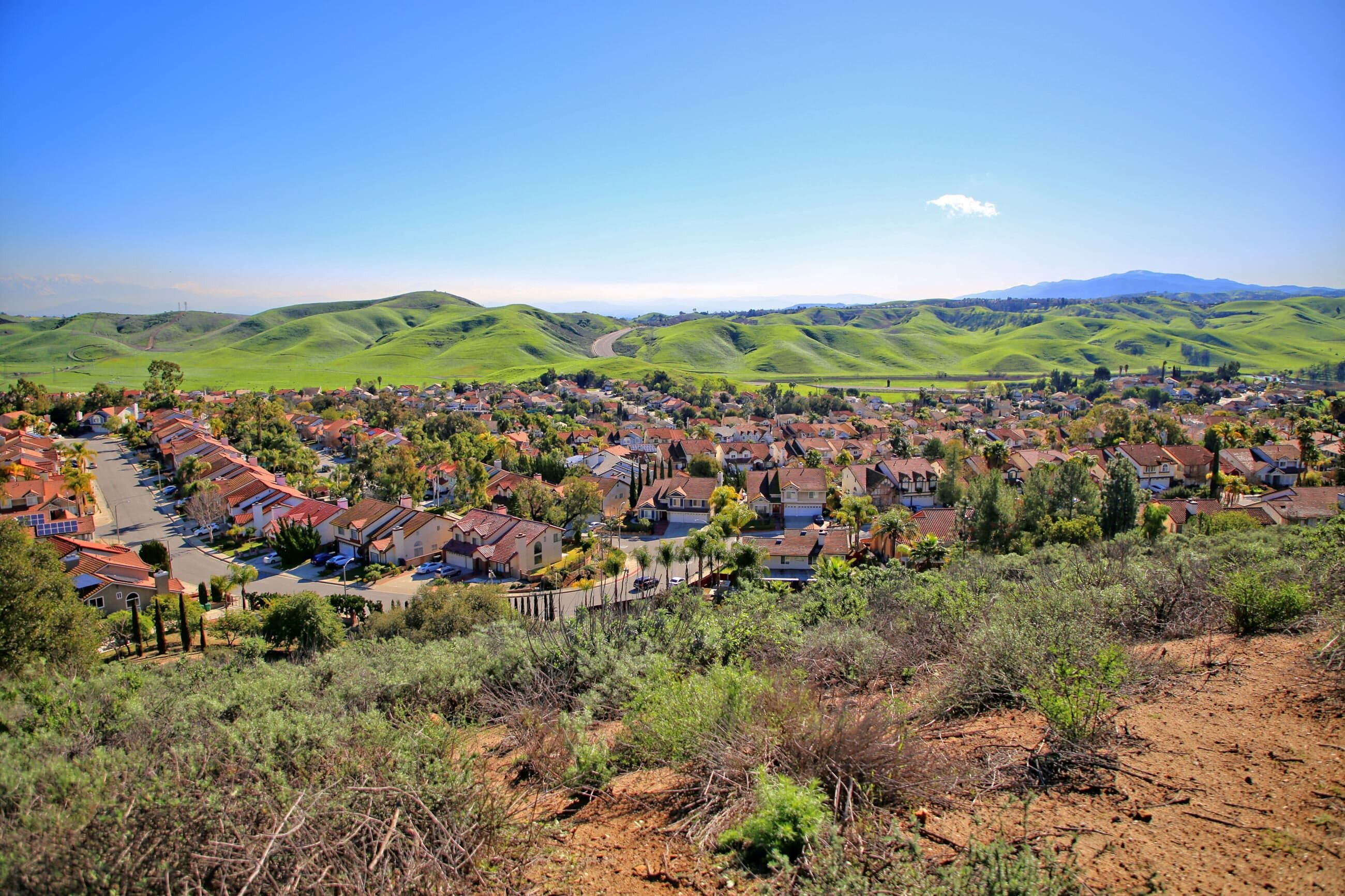
- A residential area among the hills of Diamond Bar City

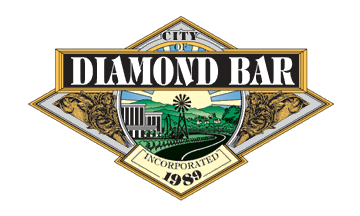
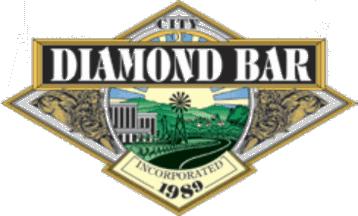
- Flag Seal Logo
- Interactive map of Diamond Bar, California
- Location in the United States
- Coordinates: 34°0′6″N 117°49′15″W
- Country: United States
- State: California
- County: Los Angeles
- Incorporated: April 18, 1989
- Named for: Diamond Bar Ranch

Government
  - Mayor: Steve Tye
  - Mayor Pro Tem: Ruth M. Low
  - City Council: Andrew Chou; Stan Liu; Chia Yu Teng

Area
  - Total: 14.88 sq mi (38.53 km^{2})
  - Land: 14.87 sq mi (38.51 km^{2})
  - Water: 0.0039 sq mi (0.01 km^{2}) 0.03%
- Elevation: 696 ft (212 m)

Population (2020)
  - Total: 55,072
  - Density: 3,703.4/sq mi (1,429.91/km^{2})
- Time zone: UTC−8 (Pacific)
  - Summer (DST): UTC−7 (PDT)
- ZIP Codes: 91765, 91789 (shared with Walnut, CA)
- Area code: 909
- FIPS code: 06-19192
- GNIS feature IDs: 1660549, 2410334
- Website: www.diamondbarca.gov

Diamond Bar is a city in the San Gabriel Valley of eastern Los Angeles County, California, United States. The 2020 census listed a population of 55,072. It is named after the "diamond over a bar" branding iron registered in 1918 by ranch owner Frederic E. Lewis (1884–1963). The city features a public Los Angeles County golf course.

Located at the junction of the Pomona and Orange freeways, Diamond Bar is primarily residential with shopping centers interspersed throughout the city. It is surrounded by the cities of Brea, Walnut, Chino Hills, Pomona, City of Industry, and the unincorporated areas of Rowland Heights and South Diamond Bar.

Northern Diamond Bar is a part of the Pomona Unified School District. Southern Diamond Bar is a part of the Walnut Valley Unified School District. The city is also served by International Polytechnic High School. It also has the first hydrogen fueling station to be built in Southern California, near the South Coast Air Quality Management District building.

== History ==
In 1840, José de la Luz Linares received the 4,340-acre (1,760 ha) Mexican land grant Rancho Los Nogales (Ranch of the Walnut Trees) from Governor Juan Alvarado. The land grant included Brea Canyon and the eastern Walnut Valley. Linares died in 1847, and his widow sold a part of the ranch to Ricardo Vejar for $100 in merchandise, 100 calves, and the assumption of her late husband's debts. Vejar also owned the Rancho San Jose to the east, and acquired the rest of Rancho Nogales over the next 10 years.

However, Vejar's luck did not last that long. As time wore on – and particularly as the United States government took over California – Rancho Los Nogales was divided and sold into multiple land ranches, the largest of which was the Diamond Bar Ranch. At the time, it was one of the largest working cattle ranches in the western U.S. The entire Diamond Bar Ranch was acquired by the Transamerica Corporation in the 1950s for the purpose of developing one of the nation's first master-planned communities. Transamerica gave the Diamond Bar name to its new community and incorporated the ranch's familiar diamond and bar cattle brand into various logos (many of which are still in use today).

The first houses in this development were built in 1959, adjacent to the future location of the Pomona Freeway, which was built through the area ten years later. The town's development and population grew extremely quickly after that.

Transamerica oversaw all development of the community through the 1960s. The Transamerica Corporation divested itself of all its real estate ventures in the 1970s and 1980s. As a result, the Diamond Bar project was sold to multiple developers and much of its initial master plan was not implemented during the latter half of its development in the 1980s.

The City of Diamond Bar was incorporated on April 18, 1989.

== Geography ==
Diamond Bar's main road, Diamond Bar Boulevard, runs along the bottom of the valley that eventually becomes Brea Canyon, and housing developments overlook the boulevard on both sides from surrounding hills. The city lies roughly between the ends of the Chino Fault and the Whittier Fault, both part of the Elsinore Fault Zone.

Positioned in the southeastern corner of the San Gabriel Valley in eastern Los Angeles County, Diamond Bar is approximately 27 miles (43 km) east of Downtown Los Angeles. Neighboring communities include Walnut, Rowland Heights, and Pomona. Diamond Bar is also adjacent to the Inland Empire region, with Chino Hills directly to the east, and to the south of Diamond Bar lie the cities of Brea and La Habra in Orange County.

According to the United States Census Bureau, the city has a total area of 14.9 square miles (39 km^{2}), with no significant bodies of water.

Both the CA-60 Freeway and the CA-57 Freeway run through Diamond Bar. the I-10 Freeway is just north of the city and CA-71 is just east of the city. Major thoroughfares include Grand Avenue, Diamond Bar Boulevard, Pathfinder Road, Golden Springs Drive, and Brea Canyon Road.

=== Climate ===
Climate data for Diamond Bar, California
Month	Jan	Feb	Mar	Apr	May	Jun	Jul	Aug	Sep	Oct	Nov	Dec	Year
Record high °F (°C)	91 (33)	94 (34)	100 (38)	104 (40)	106 (41)	106 (41)	113 (45)	109 (43)	113 (45)	107 (42)	97 (36)	93 (34)	113 (45)
Mean daily maximum °F (°C)	67.5 (19.7)	68.8 (20.4)	70.8 (21.6)	76.2 (24.6)	79.1 (26.2)	84.3 (29.1)	90.4 (32.4)	92.3 (33.5)	89.4 (31.9)	80.4 (26.9)	73.7 (23.2)	67.1 (19.5)	78.3 (25.8)
Mean daily minimum °F (°C)	40.8 (4.9)	45.8 (7.7)	46.7 (8.2)	50.2 (10.1)	53.7 (12.1)	58.2 (14.6)	62.2 (16.8)	63.1 (17.3)	61.4 (16.3)	55.4 (13.0)	46.6 (8.1)	39.7 (4.3)	52.0 (11.1)
Record low °F (°C)	21 (−6)	23 (−5)	26 (−3)	29 (−2)	34 (1)	39 (4)	41 (5)	43 (6)	38 (3)	29 (−2)	24 (−4)	22 (−6)	21 (−6)
Average precipitation inches (mm)	3.11 (79)	4.76 (121)	2.63 (67)	1.20 (30)	0.23 (5.8)	0.09 (2.3)	0.00 (0.00)	0.03 (0.76)	0.15 (3.8)	1.05 (27)	1.62 (41)	2.45 (62)	17.32 (440)

== Demographics ==
Historical population
Census	Pop.	Note	%±
1970	10,576		—
1980	28,045		165.2%
1990	53,672		91.4%
2000	56,287		4.9%
2010	55,544		−1.3%
2020	55,072		−0.8%
U.S. Decennial Census; 1860–1870 1880-1890; 1900 1910 1920; 1930 1940 1950; 1960 1970 1980; 1990 2000 2010; 2020

Diamond Bar first appeared as a city in the 1970 U.S. census.

=== Racial and ethnic composition ===
Diamond Bar city, California – Racial and ethnic composition Note: the US Census treats Hispanic/Latino as an ethnic category. This table excludes Latinos from the racial categories and assigns them to a separate category. Hispanics/Latinos may be of any race.
Race / Ethnicity (NH = Non-Hispanic)	Pop 1980	Pop 1990	Pop 2000	Pop 2010	Pop 2020	% 1980	% 1990	% 2000	% 2010	% 2020
White alone (NH)	20,902	28,286	17,471	11,812	8,117	74.53%	52.70%	31.04%	21.27%	14.74%
Black or African American alone (NH)	1,389	2,935	2,624	2,194	1,717	4.95%	5.47%	4.66%	3.95%	3.12%
Native American or Alaska Native alone (NH)	104	138	98	67	56	0.37%	0.26%	0.17%	0.12%	0.10%
Asian alone (NH)	1,663	13,065	23,922	28,883	32,626	5.93%	24.34%	42.50%	52.00%	59.24%
Native Hawaiian or Pacific Islander alone (NH)	1,663	13,065	62	92	79	5.93%	24.34%	0.11%	0.17%	0.14%
Other Race alone (NH)	29	112	101	93	179	0.10%	0.21%	0.18%	0.17%	0.33%
Mixed race or Multiracial (NH)	x	x	1,616	1,265	1,495	x	x	2.87%	2.28%	2.71%
Hispanic or Latino (any race)	3,958	9,136	10,393	11,138	10,803	14.11%	17.02%	18.46%	20.05%	19.62%
Total	28,045	53,672	56,287	55,544	55,072	100.00%	100.00%	100.00%	100.00%	100.00%

=== 2020 census ===
As of the 2020 census, Diamond Bar had a population of 55,072 and a population density of 3,703.6 inhabitants per square mile (1,430.0/km^{2}). The census reported that 100.0% of residents lived in urban areas and 0.0% lived in rural areas.

The age distribution was 18.4% under the age of 18, 9.0% aged 18 to 24, 24.1% aged 25 to 44, 29.6% aged 45 to 64, and 18.9% who were 65 years of age or older. The median age was 43.8 years. For every 100 females, there were 94.5 males, and for every 100 females age 18 and over there were 91.9 males age 18 and over.

The census reported that 99.6% of the population lived in households, 0.3% lived in non-institutionalized group quarters, and 0.1% were institutionalized.

There were 18,173 households, out of which 33.7% had children under the age of 18 living in them. Of all households, 61.7% were married-couple households, 3.3% were cohabiting couple households, 22.3% had a female householder with no spouse or partner present, and 12.7% had a male householder with no spouse or partner present. 13.8% of households were one person, and 6.5% had someone living alone who was 65 years of age or older. The average household size was 3.02. There were 14,846 families (81.7% of all households).

There were 18,819 housing units at an average density of 1,265.6 units per square mile (488.7 units/km^{2}), of which 18,173 (96.6%) were occupied. Of occupied units, 74.2% were owner-occupied and 25.8% were occupied by renters. 3.4% of housing units were vacant. The homeowner vacancy rate was 0.6%, and the rental vacancy rate was 4.3%.

=== Income and poverty ===
The median household income in 2023 was $106,602, with 9.1% of the population living below the poverty line.

=== 2010 census ===
The 2010 United States census reported that Diamond Bar had a population of 55,544. The population density was 3,731.5 inhabitants per square mile (1,440.7/km^{2}). The racial makeup of Diamond Bar was: 29,144 (52.5%) Asian; 18,434 (33.2%) White (21.3% Non-Hispanic White), 2,288 (4.1%) African American; 178 (0.3%) Native American; 106 (0.2%) Pacific Islander; 3,237 (5.8%) from other races; and 2,157 (3.9%) from two or more races. There were 11,138 residents of Hispanic or Latino origin, of any race (20.1%).

The Census reported that 55,415 people (99.8% of the population) lived in households, 102 (0.2%) lived in non-institutionalized group quarters, and 27 (0%) were institutionalized.

There were 17,880 households, out of which 7,008 (39.2%) had children under the age of 18 living in them, 11,792 (66.0%) were opposite-sex married couples living together, 2,165 (12.1%) had a female householder with no husband present, 886 (5.0%) had a male householder with no wife present. There were 496 (2.8%) unmarried opposite-sex partnerships, and 71 (0.4%) same-sex married couples or partnerships. 2,308 households (12.9%) were made up of individuals, and 740 (4.1%) had someone living alone who was 65 years of age or older. The average household size was 3.10. There were 14,843 families (83.0% of all households); the average family size was 3.38.

The age distribution of the population shows 11,895 people (21.4%) under the age of 18, 5,590 people (10.1%) aged 18 to 24, 13,585 people (24.5%) aged 25 to 44, 17,988 people (32.4%) aged 45 to 64, and 6,486 people (11.7%) who were 65 years of age or older. The median age was 41.0 years. For every 100 females, there were 95.2 males. For every 100 females age 18 and over, there were 92.3 males.

There were 18,455 housing units at an average density of 1,239.8 per square mile (478.7/km^{2}), of which 14,513 (81.2%) were owner-occupied, and 3,367 (18.8%) were occupied by renters. The homeowner vacancy rate was 0.9%; the rental vacancy rate was 5.2%. 45,080 people (81.2% of the population) lived in owner-occupied housing units and 10,335 people (18.6%) lived in rental housing units.

=== Mapping L.A. ===
According to Mapping L.A., Chinese and Mexican were the most common ancestries. Korea and Taiwan were the most common foreign places of birth in 2000.

== Government ==
United States presidential election results for Diamond Bar, California
Year	Republican		Democratic		Third party(ies)	
Year	No.	%	No.	%	No.	%
2000	6,988	47.00%	7,408	49.83%	471	3.17%
2004	11,937	51.05%	11,218	47.98%	227	0.97%
2008	9,658	43.22%	12,274	54.92%	415	1.86%
2012	8,828	43.26%	11,186	54.81%	393	1.93%
2016	7,393	36.60%	11,739	58.12%	1,066	5.28%
2020	10,666	39.54%	15,894	58.92%	417	1.55%
2024	10,130	44.43%	11,800	51.75%	871	3.82%

Diamond Bar City Council is currently headed by Mayor Chia Yu Teng. The other council members are Andrew Chou, Ruth Low, Stan Liu, and Steve Tye.

=== Public services ===
The Los Angeles County Sheriff's Department (LASD) operates the Walnut/Diamond Bar Station in Walnut, serving Diamond Bar.

The Los Angeles County Fire Department (LACFD) operates fire stations 119 and 120 inside of Diamond Bar. They also operate Station 119 serving both Diamond Bar and City of Industry as well as Station 187 serving both Diamond Bar and Pomona.

The Los Angeles County Department of Health Services operates the Pomona Health Center in Pomona, serving Diamond Bar.

=== County, state, and federal representation ===
The city is in the First District of the Los Angeles County Board of Supervisors, represented by Hilda Solis.

In the California State Senate, Diamond Bar is in the 30th senatorial district, represented by Democrat Bob Archuleta. In the California State Assembly, it is in the 56th Assembly district, represented by Democrat Lisa Calderon.

In the United States House of Representatives, Diamond Bar is in California's 38th congressional district, represented by Democrat Linda Sánchez.

== Education ==
The city is primarily divided into two Blue-ribbon districts. Diamond Bar students north of the city power lines are served by four elementary schools, one middle school, and one high school provided by the Pomona Unified School District. Students south of the power lines running through the city are part of the Walnut Valley Unified School District and are served by nine elementary schools, three middle schools, and three high schools.

== Economy ==
=== Top employers ===
According to the city's 2012 Comprehensive Annual Financial Report, the top employers in the city are:

#	Employer	# of Employees
1	South Coast Air Quality Management District	786
2	Walnut Valley Unified School District	520
3	Transcription Services	500
4	Travelers	401
5	Magan Medical Inc	300
6	Pomona Unified School District	210
7	Carrescia James-First Team Sns	200
8	Diamond Bar High School	200
9	First Team Real Estate	150
10	Baybrook Services Inc	120

== Notable people ==
- Ling Ling Chang, former California state assemblywoman and state senator
- Danny Dorn, Major League Baseball player, Arizona Diamondbacks
- Jim Edmonds, retired Major League Baseball player, most notably with the Anaheim Angels and St. Louis Cardinals
- Bob Huff, California state senator
- Jay Kim, first Korean-American congressman
- Ryan Lane, American actor
- Gary Miller, former mayor and congressman
- Ippei Mizuhara, Japanese interpreter previously employed by the Los Angeles Angels and Los Angeles Dodgers of Major League Baseball (MLB), most notably serving as Shohei Ohtani's interpreter.
- Alex Morgan, soccer forward, 2015 & 2019 Women's World Cup champion, Olympic gold medalist, member of the United States women's national soccer team
- Teddy Park, South Korean producer and rapper; known for being a major producer for K-pop groups Blackpink, 2NE1, and Big Bang
- Gary Pettis, former center fielder for the California Angels and current coach for the Houston Astros.
- Xavier Scruggs, former first baseman for the St. Louis Cardinals, born in Diamond Bar in 1987.
- Snoop Dogg, rapper
- Taebin, South Korean rapper and singer; member of hip hop group 1TYM
- Keith Van Horn, retired NBA player; drafted 1st round, 2nd overall pick in the 1997 draft by the Philadelphia 76ers, later on traded to the New Jersey Nets; played with the Philadelphia 76ers, New Jersey Nets, Milwaukee Bucks, and Dallas Mavericks
- Ryan Wendell, offensive lineman for the New England Patriots
- Jason Wright, American businessman and football executive
- Tiffany Young, Korean-American singer; member of girl group Girls' Generation

== See also ==
- Freeway Complex Fire
