= California State Route 71 =

Highway in California

State Route 71
- SR 71 highlighted in red

Route information
- Maintained by Caltrans
- Length: 15 mi (24 km)
- Existed: 1934–present

Major junctions
- South end: SR 91 in Corona
- SR 83 in Chino Hills; SR 142 in Chino Hills; SR 60 in Pomona
- North end: I-10 / SR 57 in San Dimas

Location
- Country: United States
- State: California
- Counties: Riverside, San Bernardino, Los Angeles

Highway system
- State highways in California; Interstate; US; State; Scenic; History; Pre‑1964; Unconstructed; Deleted; Freeways
← SR 70	→ SR 72

State Route 71 (SR 71) is a 15-mile (24 km) state highway in the U.S. state of California. Serving Riverside, San Bernardino, and Los Angeles counties, it runs from SR 91 in Corona to the Kellogg Interchange with I-10 and SR 57 on the border of Pomona and San Dimas. The segment from SR 91 to SR 83 in Chino Hills is called the Corona Freeway, formerly the Corona Expressway and before then the Temescal Freeway. SR 71 is designated as the Chino Valley Freeway between SR 83 and the Kellogg Interchange.

== Route description ==
Route 71 is defined in section 371 of the California Streets and Highways Code, and that the highway is "from Route 57 to Route 91 via Pomona and Chino Hills".

Beginning at its southern terminus, SR 91 in Corona, SR 71 is an expressway for a half-mile when it intersects with Pomona Rincon Road. After this intersection, SR 71 becomes a freeway up to Rio Rancho Road in Pomona. Construction is ongoing on the segment between Rio Rancho Road and Mission Boulevard in Pomona to upgrade it from an expressway to freeway. The route then resumes as a short freeway at Mission Boulevard for about a mile until it meets at the Kellogg Interchange in San Dimas, where it terminates at I-10 and SR 57 (previously, it was an expressway between Mission Boulevard and its northern terminus, but this segment was upgraded to a freeway in 2012).

The section of the highway between Corona and Chino is notorious for thick winter fogs at dawn and dusk, resulting in many automobile collisions when drivers fail to slow down due to reduced visibility. Residents of Los Serranos (now Chino Hills) recall being awakened by sounds of crinkling bumpers, fenders, and headlights.

As SR 71 serves as an important northwest-southeast corridor between the cities in the Pomona and San Gabriel valleys (eastern Los Angeles County) and the cities of western Riverside County, it is heavily traveled. It is used as an alternative to SR 57 (the Orange Freeway) situated to the west and I-15 (the Ontario Freeway) located to the east.

When the route runs through Chino Hills and Chino, there is a high-occupancy vehicle lane available for use; however, this carpool lane ends when the route enters Riverside County (to the south) and Los Angeles County (to the north). The route is a four-lane highway between SR 91 and Central Avenue (excluding HOV lanes), a six-lane highway (excluding HOV lanes) from Central Avenue to SR 60, and again a four-lane highway from SR 60 to I-10/SR 57.

SR 71 is part of the California Freeway and Expressway System, and is part of the National Highway System.

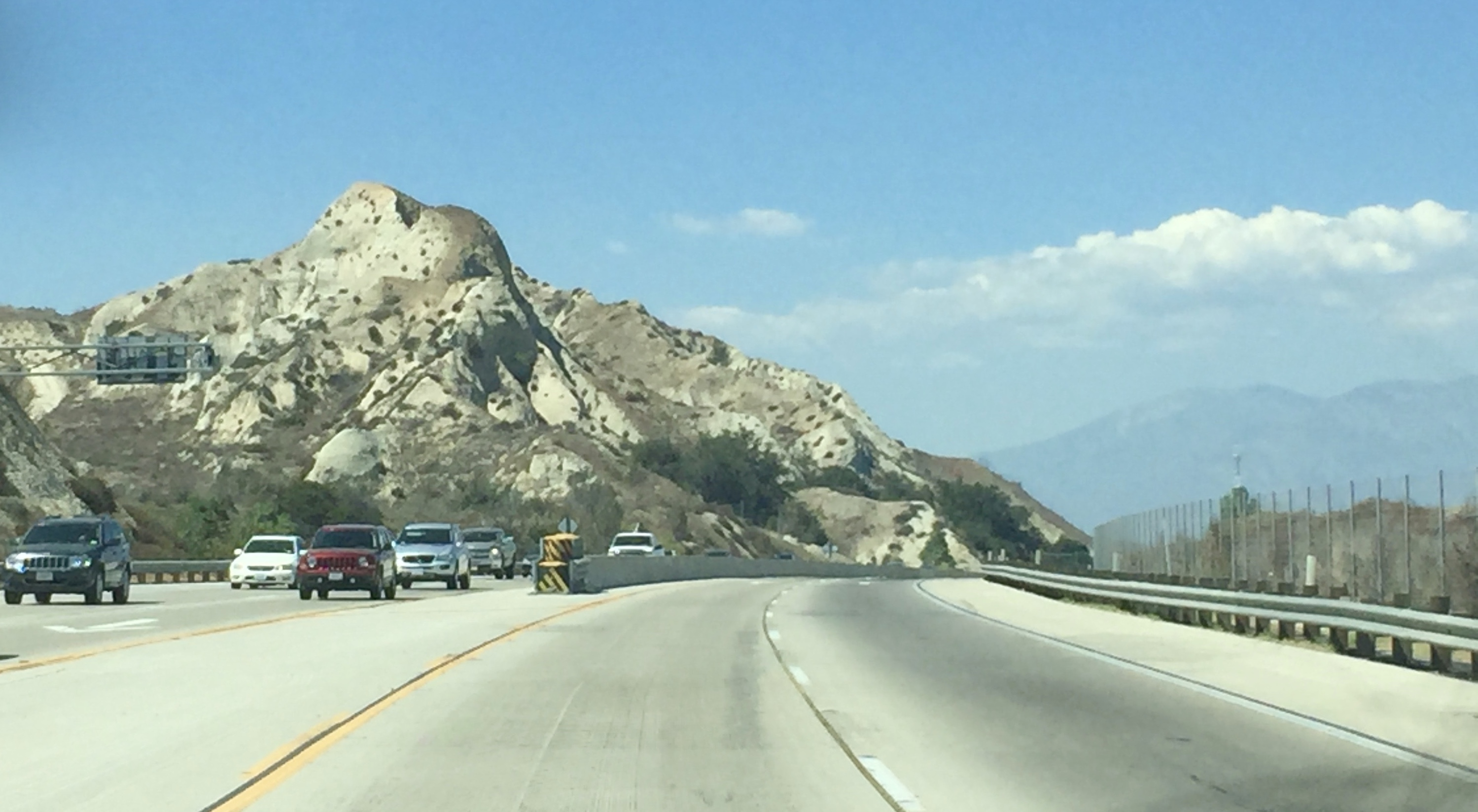
SR 71 north of Corona

== History ==
The original routing of SR 71, according to the 1934 listing, was from US 80 (now I-8), in San Diego north to US 66 (now SR 66), near Claremont via Lake Elsinore and Temecula. The route between Claremont/Pomona and Lake Elsinore roughly followed the path of the Butterfield Overland Mail stagecoach line. When the portion between San Diego and Temecula was redesignated US 395, SR 71 was rerouted to run from Pomona to Aguanga. In 1973, it was cut back to its present terminus in Corona, with the portion between Corona and Temecula becoming I-15 and the portion between Temecula and Aguanga becoming SR 79 and SR 371. The early section of the Chino Valley Freeway was built in 1971 from the Kellogg Interchange to SR 60 (the Pomona Freeway). The section from SR 60 to SR 91 (the Riverside Freeway) was completed in March 1998.

In September 2008, construction began on the Mission 71 Project in Pomona. A bridge was constructed to allow Mission Boulevard to pass over SR 71, which now has entrance and exit ramps to Mission. Also, the intersection with Ninth Street was closed. The freeway was extended south to the former intersection at Ninth Street, where it resumes expressway status to the intersection with Old Pomona Road. The construction project was completed in December 2011.

The Riverside County Transportation Commission constructed a two-lane flyover ramp between eastbound SR 91 and northbound SR 71 to replace the previous one-lane loop ramp. The flyover ramp was completed and opened to traffic on June 23, 2025.

== Future ==
The City of Pomona is currently working with Caltrans to upgrade the segment between Rio Rancho Road and Mission Boulevard from a four-lane expressway to a full eight-lane freeway. By December 2016, all traffic signals were removed. Traffic entering and exiting the roads that lead into the nearby neighborhoods (North Ranch Road, Old Pomona Road, and Phillips Drive) may no longer enter or exit northbound due to added barriers in the highway's median. However, until 2021, southbound traffic could use these streets. (North Ranch Road, Old Pomona Road, and Phillips Drive can enter the highway via a stop sign.) These streets have been completely closed to southbound access as of 2021. Just south of the Mission Boulevard exit, all aspects of the highway, such as its alignment, lane width, pavement, barriers, and access, 'upgrade' to freeway standards. This project is expected to be fully complete by 2027.

== Exit list ==
Except where prefixed with a letter, postmiles were measured on the road as it was in 1964, based on a west-to-east alignment (including its original eastern segment that extended through Temecula and Anza), and do not necessarily reflect current mileage. Postmile prefixes include: R reflecting a realignment in the route since then, M indicating a second realignment, L referring to an overlap due to a correction or change, and T indicating postmiles classified as temporary. Segments that remain unconstructed or have been relinquished to local control may be omitted. The numbers reset at county lines; the start and end postmiles in each county are given in the county column.

County	Location	Postmile	Exit	Destinations	Notes
Riverside; RIV R3.03-R0.00	Corona	R3.03	—	SR 91 (Riverside Freeway) – Riverside, Beach Cities	Southern terminus of SR 71; interchange; SR 91 exit 45
Riverside; RIV R3.03-R0.00		2.44	—	Pomona Rincon Road	At-grade intersection; government only access
Riverside; RIV R3.03-R0.00			South end of freeway		
San Bernardino; SBD R8.48-R0.00	Chino–Chino Hills line	R7.98	4	SR 83 north (Euclid Avenue) / Butterfield Ranch Road	
San Bernardino; SBD R8.48-R0.00	Chino Hills	R6.52	5	Pine Avenue	
San Bernardino; SBD R8.48-R0.00	Chino Hills	R4.89	7	Soquel Canyon Parkway, Central Avenue	
San Bernardino; SBD R8.48-R0.00	Chino–Chino Hills line	R3.35	8	SR 142 west (Chino Hills Parkway) / Ramona Avenue	
San Bernardino; SBD R8.48-R0.00	Chino–Chino Hills line	R1.82	10	Grand Avenue, Edison Avenue	
San Bernardino; SBD R8.48-R0.00	Chino–Chino Hills line	R0.91	11	Chino Avenue	Signed as exit 11A southbound
San Bernardino; SBD R8.48-R0.00	Chino Hills	R0.09	12A	Riverside Drive / Peyton Drive to SR 60 east	"To SR 60" not signed southbound; signed as exit 11B southbound; no southbound entrance
Los Angeles; LA R4.70-R0.34	Pomona	R4.31	12B	SR 60 west (Pomona Freeway) – Los Angeles	Southbound exit is via exit 13; SR 60 east exit 29A
Los Angeles; LA R4.70-R0.34	Pomona	R4.31	12	SR 60 east (Pomona Freeway) – Riverside	Northbound exit is via exit 12A; SR 60 west exit 29B
Los Angeles; LA R4.70-R0.34	Pomona	R3.61	13	Rio Rancho Road to SR 60 west	"To SR 60" not signed northbound
Los Angeles; LA R4.70-R0.34	Pomona	1.92	—	Old Pomona Road	Closed; former southbound exit and entrance; at-grade intersection
Los Angeles; LA R4.70-R0.34	Pomona		—	N. Ranch Road	Closed; former southbound exit and entrance; at-grade intersection
Los Angeles; LA R4.70-R0.34	Pomona		—	W. Phillips Drive	Closed; former southbound exit and entrance; at-grade intersection
Los Angeles; LA R4.70-R0.34	Pomona	1.92	—	Ninth Street	Closed; former at-grade intersection
Los Angeles; LA R4.70-R0.34	Pomona	1.62	14B (Note: Mission Boulevard is signed as Exit 14B, and Holt Avenue/Valley Boulevard is signed as Exit 14A, despite the fact that Mission Boulevard is south of Holt Avenue)	Mission Boulevard	Former US 60
Los Angeles; LA R4.70-R0.34	Pomona	1.24	—	Pomona Boulevard	Closed; former northbound exit and southbound entrance
Los Angeles; LA R4.70-R0.34	Pomona	R1.48	14A	Holt Avenue, Valley Boulevard to I-10 east – San Bernardino	"To I-10" not signed southbound; former US 99 south
Los Angeles; LA R4.70-R0.34	Pomona–San Dimas line	R0.34	15	I-10 west (San Bernardino Freeway) – Los Angeles	Access to I-10 east via exit 14A; no access to SR 57 south; Kellogg Interchange; northern terminus of SR 71; SR 57 north is former I-210 west; I-10 east exit 42B; SR 57 south exit 22C
Los Angeles; LA R4.70-R0.34	San Dimas	R0.34		SR 57 north (Orange Freeway)	Access to I-10 east via exit 14A; no access to SR 57 south; Kellogg Interchange; northern terminus of SR 71; SR 57 north is former I-210 west; I-10 east exit 42B; SR 57 south exit 22C
1.000 mi = 1.609 km; 1.000 km = 0.621 mi: Closed/former; Incomplete access
