= Foothill Freeway =

Interstate and state highway in California

Interstate 210 and State Route 210
- Foothill Freeway
- I-210 highlighted in red; SR 210 in purple

Route information
- Auxiliary route of I-10
- Maintained by Caltrans
- Length: 85.31 mi (137.29 km) Length includes the entire Foothill Freeway.
- History: Route proposed 1933; Designated 210 in 1964
- Component highways: I-210 from Los Angeles to Glendora; SR 210 from Glendora to Redlands

Major junctions
- West end: I-5 in Los Angeles
- SR 118 in Los Angeles; SR 2 in La Cañada Flintridge; SR 134 in Pasadena; I-605 in Irwindale; SR 57 in Glendora; I-15 at the Rancho Cucamonga-Fontana border; I-215 in San Bernardino; SR 330 in San Bernardino
- East end: I-10 in Redlands

Location
- Country: United States
- State: California
- Counties: Los Angeles, San Bernardino

Highway system
- Interstate Highway System; Main; Auxiliary; Suffixed; Business; Future; State highways in California; Interstate; US; State; Scenic; History; Pre‑1964; Unconstructed; Deleted; Freeways
| ← SR 209 | → SR 211 |

The Foothill Freeway is a freeway in the Greater Los Angeles in the U.S. state of California, running from the Sylmar district of Los Angeles east to Redlands. The western segment is signed as Interstate 210 (I-210) from its western end at I-5 to SR 57 in Glendora, while the eastern segment is signed as State Route 210 (SR 210) to its eastern terminus at I-10. The entire Foothill Freeway is legally referred to as Route 210 under the California Streets and Highways Code, and is colloquially known as "the 210" by Southern California residents.

The Foothill Freeway name is a reference to Foothill Boulevard and the San Gabriel Mountains, both of which the freeway runs parallel to for most of its length. The freeway follows the foothills of these mountains, connecting the northeastern suburbs of Los Angeles with the Inland Empire. Historically, the Foothill Freeway spanned multiple numerical designations. Additionally, the I-210 designation has changed routings, previously including a portion of what is now the Orange Freeway (SR 57). East of Pasadena, the Foothill Freeway parallels, and in some parts replaced, the route of former U.S. Route 66.

The portion between I-5 and SR 259 in San Bernardino was up to Interstate Highway standards by 2007, but the eastern segment remains signed as a state route because the portion between SR 259 and I-10 had not met those standards. On February 26, 2020, construction in each direction took place to complete the standards required. The three-year project added lanes from Sterling Avenue in San Bernardino to San Bernardino Avenue in Redlands. Although construction was completed in September 2023, the eastern end currently remains "Route 210".

== Route description ==
Route 210 is defined as follows in section 510, subdivision (a), of the California Streets and Highways Code:

Route 210 is from:
(1) Route 5 near Tunnel Station to Route 57 near the City of San Dimas via the vicinity of the City of San Fernando.
(2) Route 57 near the City of San Dimas to Route 10 in the City of Redlands via the vicinity of the City of Highland.

The section of Route 210 defined in paragraph (2) is not considered an Interstate Highway according to the Federal Highway Administration (FHWA)'s route logs.

I-210's western terminus is at its junction with I-5, near the Sylmar district of Los Angeles. From that point, the freeway's alignment is generally diagonal as it heads southeast through the northeastern San Fernando Valley and the Crescenta Valley. After leaving Los Angeles, it enters northern Glendale and then La Cañada Flintridge where it meets with the Glendale Freeway and Angeles Crest Highway portions of SR 2 before turning due south towards the junction with SR 134) in Pasadena. At this interchange, the Foothill Freeway shifts its alignment and direction, becoming an east–west freeway. From the north, the primary through lanes of I-210 become the unsigned northern stub of unfinished I-710, while from the east, the through lanes of the Ventura Freeway become I-210 as the Ventura Freeway reaches its official eastern terminus. After intersecting the northern terminus of I-605, I-210 then continues east to SR 57 in Glendora. Heading east from the SR 57 interchange until its eastern terminus at I-10 in Redlands, Route 210 is signed as a state route.

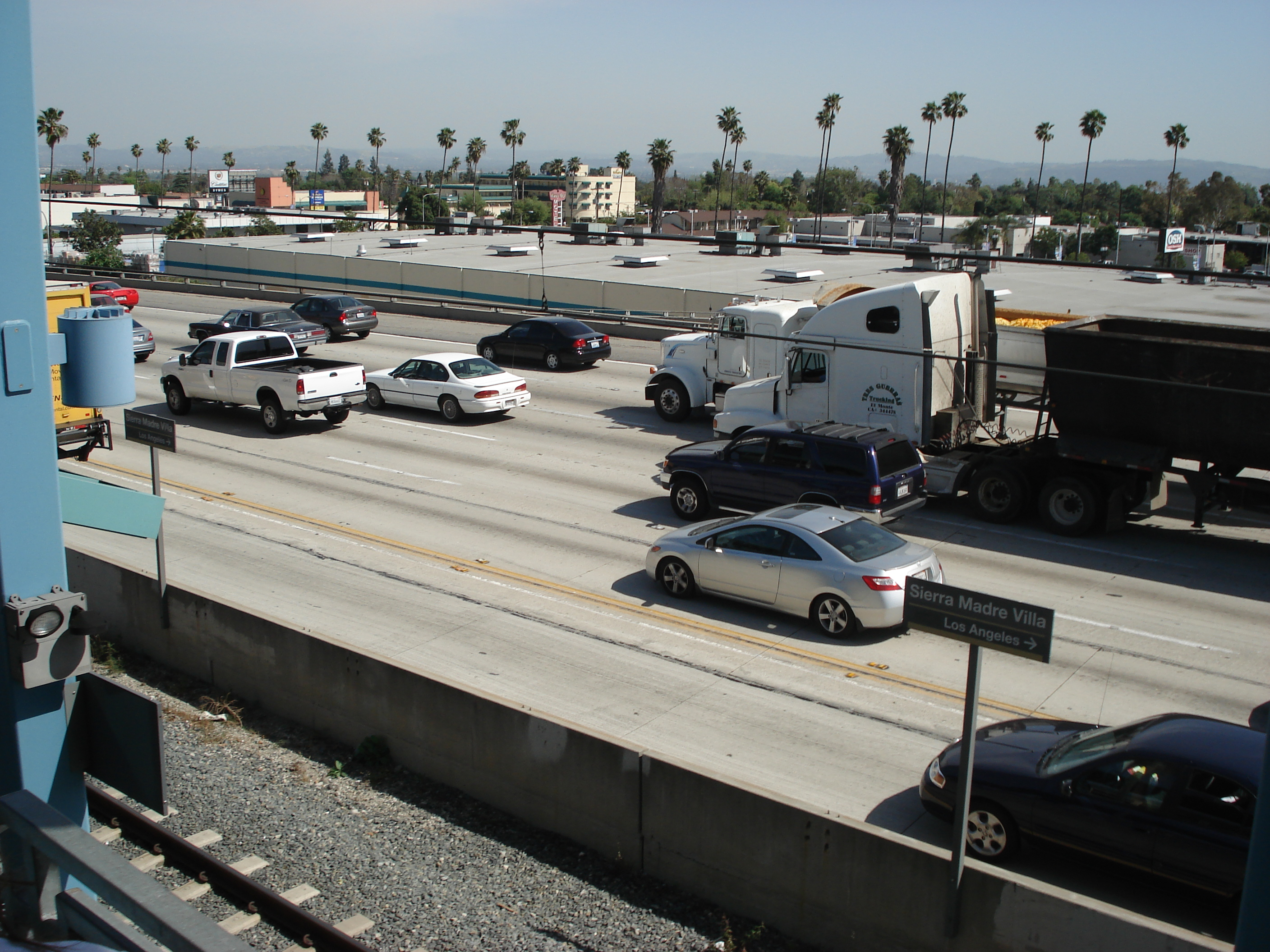
Foothill Freeway as seen from Sierra Madre Villa station of the Metro A Line, in Pasadena

Portions of the Los Angeles County Metropolitan Transportation Authority's (Metro) light rail A Line runs in the median strip of I-210 from Pasadena to Arcadia, serving three stations at Lake, Allen, and Sierra Madre Villa.

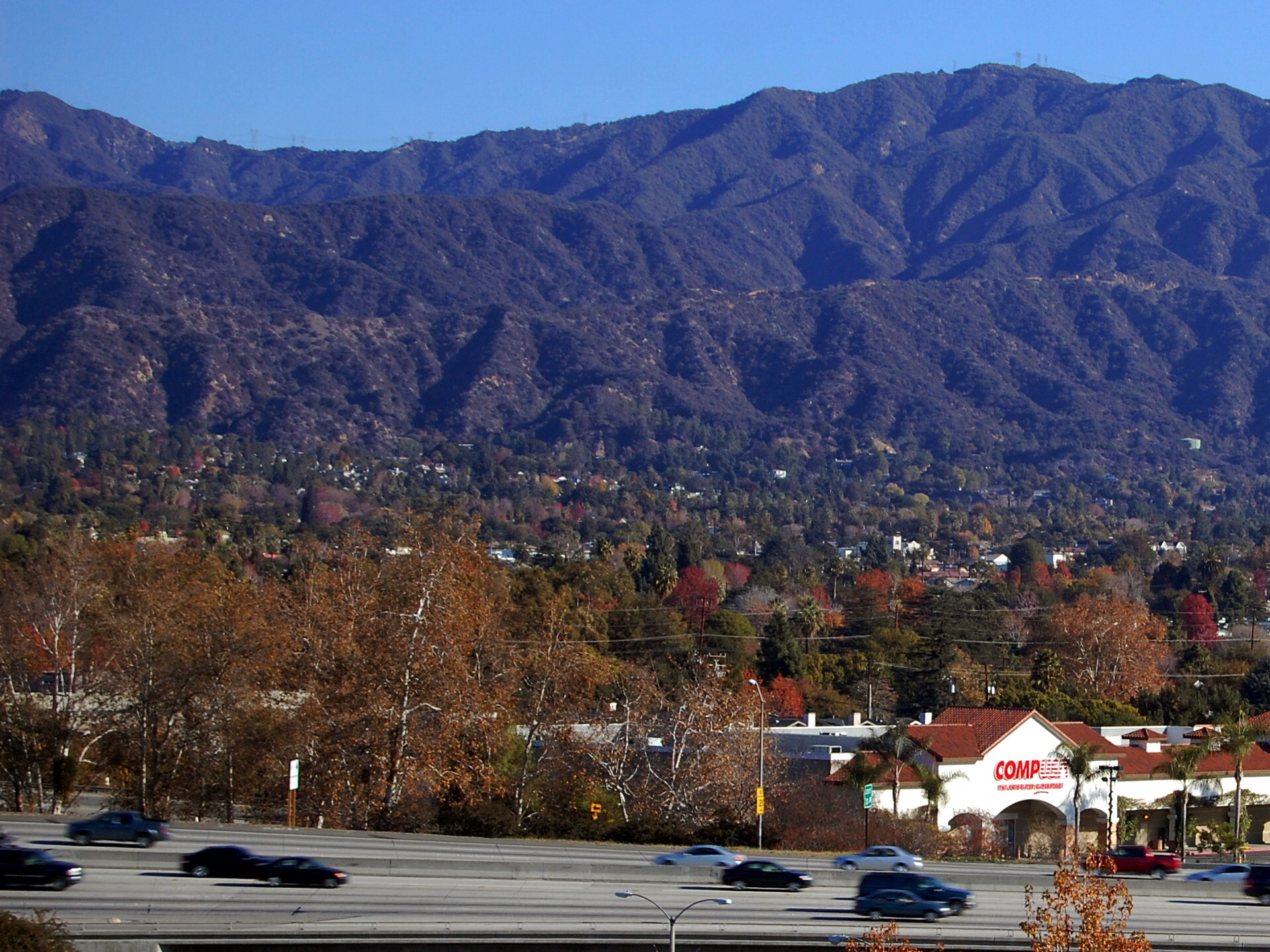
Elevated portion of freeway in Monrovia

SR 210 presently has two distinct segments. The western segment consists of newer freeway, beginning at the east end of I-210 near San Dimas. SR 210 extends eastward, eventually paralleling Highland Avenue, as it continues through Fontana. It intersects I-15, an artery between Southern California and Nevada, about 10 miles (16 km) before it meets with I-215 in San Bernardino.

The segment east of I-215 is the former alignment of SR 30. This segment extends eastward to junctions with I-215, SR 259, SR 18, and SR 330 in Highland. SR 210 then curves southward and ends in a junction with I-10 in Redlands.

Route 210 is part of the California Freeway and Expressway System, and is part of the National Highway System, a network of highways that are considered important to the country's economy, defense, and mobility by the Federal Highway Administration. Route 210 is eligible for the State Scenic Highway System, but it is not officially designated as a scenic highway by the California Department of Transportation (Caltrans). Route 210 from Route 5 to Route 10 in Redlands is known as the Foothill Freeway, as named by Senate Concurrent Resolution 29, Chapter 128 in 1991. In 2023, the California State Legislature passed Assembly Bill 776, adding sections 101.19 and section 510 subsection (b) to the California Streets and Highways Code that authorizes Caltrans to either designate Route 210 as the "Southern California Native American Freeway" or work with the California Native American Heritage Commission and local governments to develop another name to honor tribal lands historically located along the freeway.

=== Glendora Curve ===
The Glendora Curve is the former colloquial name for the interchange between what is now SR 57 and the Foothill Freeway, I-210. The "curve" refers to the I-210 freeway as it turned south in an almost 90 degree angle in the city of Glendora. Prior to 2002, this "curve" was entirely part of I-210, as it continued south to its former eastern terminus at the Kellogg Interchange at the junctions of the Chino Valley Freeway, SR 71, the San Bernardino Freeway, I-10, and SR 57. Once the I-210 was extended eastward from the Glendora Curve, the portion of I-210 south of the Glendora Curve was transferred to SR 57 and the name Glendora Curve fell out of popular use.

== History ==
=== Initial segments ===
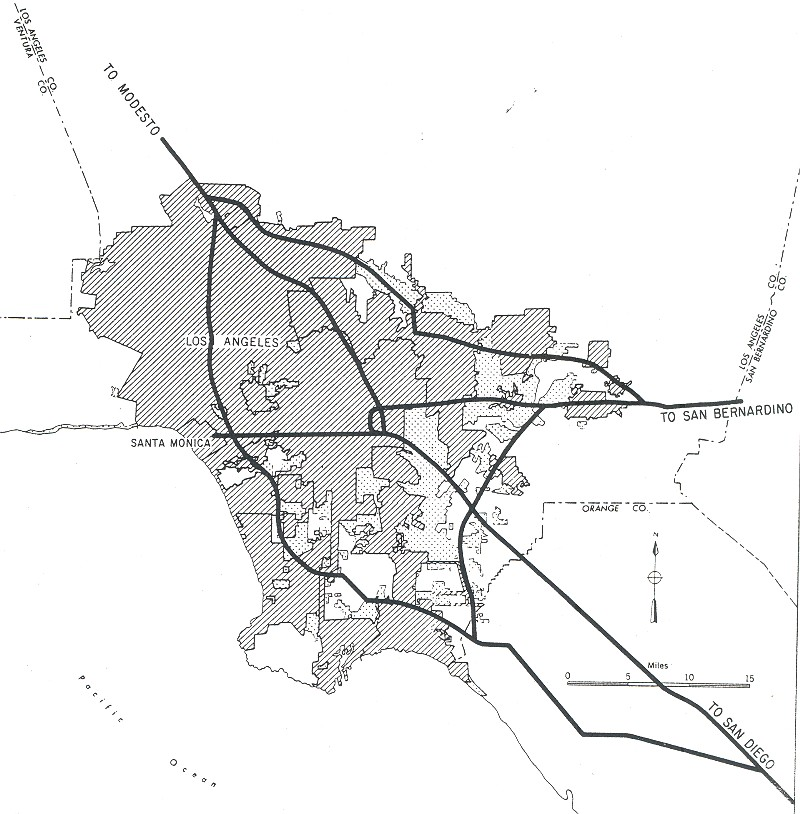
1955 map of the planned Interstates in the Greater Los Angeles Area. The original proposal for present-day I-210 includes its original eastern terminus in Pomona.

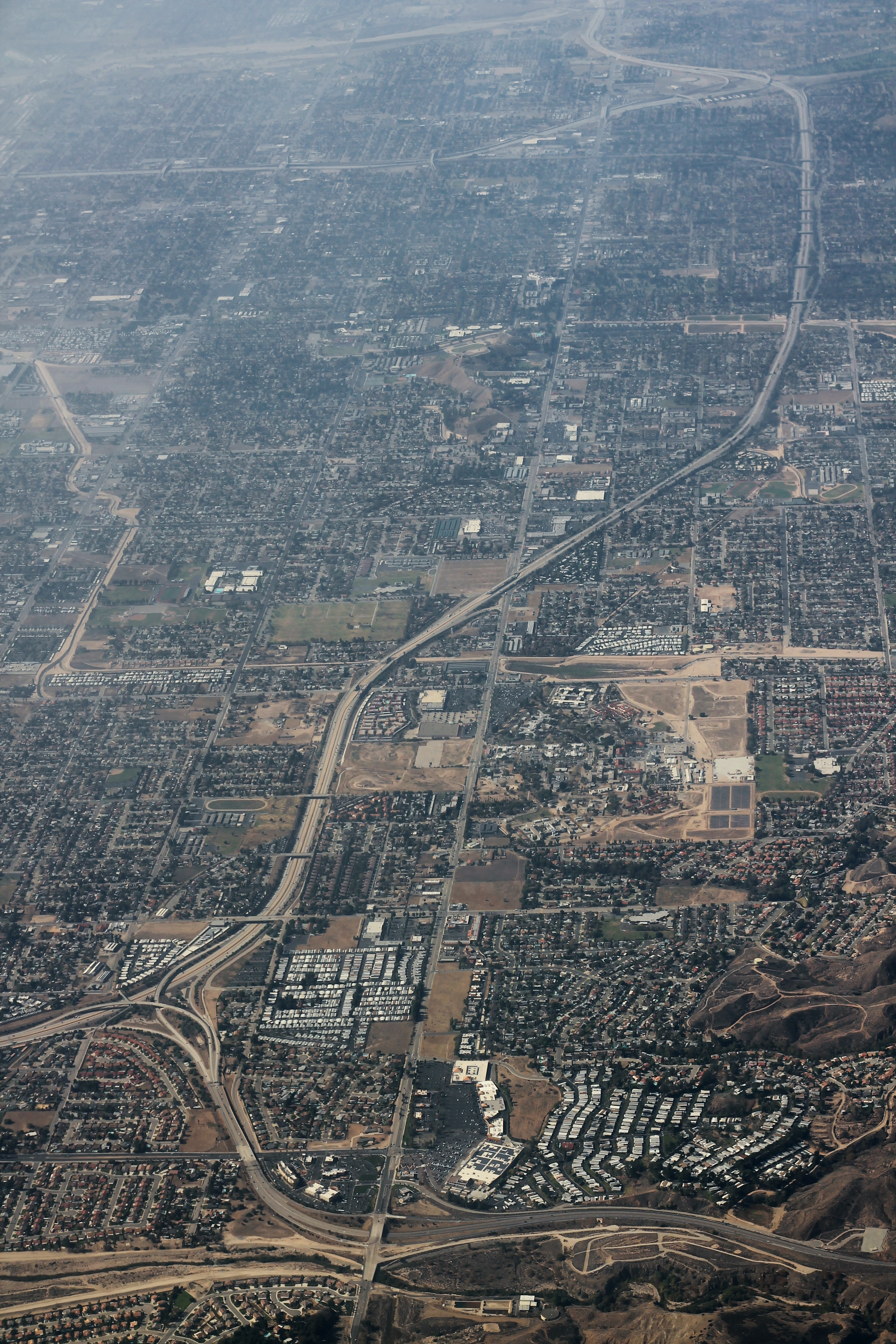
Aerial image of the freeway through San Bernardino

Construction began on the Foothill Freeway in 1958. The first section, starting at the eastern end of Foothill Boulevard in what is now La Cañada Flintridge, and going across the Arroyo Seco near Devil's Gate Dam to Canada Avenue in Pasadena, was opened in 1966; it was then signed as SR 118. This section was bypassed by the next stage of construction.

The section going northwest from Pasadena through La Canada Flintridge to the junction with I-5 in Sylmar was built in several stages between 1971 and 1977. The first section to open was between Ocean View Boulevard and Lowell Avenue in La Crescenta, in July 1972, followed in November by the section between Berkshire Avenue and Ocean View in La Cañada Flintridge. The section of freeway in Sylmar, California, that was intended to open first (between I-5 and Maclay Avenue) was damaged by the 1971 Sylmar Earthquake, and the opening was delayed until repairs could be completed in 1973. In the Pasadena, California, section, a bridge span traversing the Arroyo Seco collapsed during construction on October 17, 1972, killing six workers, and as a result, the northbound section through Pasadena was not fully opened until 1974. The last section in the San Fernando Valley to be completed was between Highway 118 in Lake View Terrace, and Lowell Avenue in La Crescenta. While this section was largely completed by 1976, the portion between Sunland Boulevard and Wheatland Avenue (traversing the Tujunga Wash) was not fully completed until 1981. From 1976 to 1980, the uncompleted section of I-210 (notably near the interchange with Highway 118, near the Paxton Street exit) was rented by MGM Television for the filming of the television series CHiPs.

In 1968, the Atchison, Topeka and Santa Fe Railway depot at Santa Anita, a historic structure built in 1890, was moved to the Los Angeles County Arboretum and Botanic Garden to make way for a section of the freeway passing through Arcadia. Construction of the freeway through Pasadena and Arcadia prompted the realignment and relocation of the railroad's mainline to the freeway's median, with the former mainline trackage between Sierra Bonita and Kinneloa avenues in Pasadena becoming an industrial spur accessed via an underpass below the freeway's eastbound lanes. The "Pasadena" section from SR 134 to Rosemead Boulevard was completed in 1976, while the section from Arcadia, California to the Kellogg Interchange with I-10 at Pomona had been previously completed in 1971. The section between the Kellogg Interchange and Glendora is no longer part of I-210. In 2003, this piece was renumbered as part of SR 57, known as the Orange Freeway.

=== Extensions ===
In the 1990s, Caltrans began constructing extensions to the freeway from Glendora east to the former I-215/SR 30 interchange in San Bernardino. In 2003, a 20-mile (32 km) segment east from Glendora to Fontana was completed, with the portion proceeding south from Glendora renumbered SR 57. The remaining section east of I-15 between Fontana and I-215 was opened on July 24, 2007.

Caltrans has petitioned the American Association of State Highway and Transportation Officials (AASHTO), the trade organization that oversees the designation and numbering of the Interstate Highway System, to resign the entire Foothill Freeway, including the entire segments of SR 210 and SR 30, as I-210. Upon completion of the new freeway segment west of I-215, SR 30 from I-215 to I-10 in Redlands was resigned as SR 210. The resigning in 2003 of the former portion of I-210 now signed as SR 57 truncated I-210 from its parent route, I-10. Presuming that authority is given at some point in the future to resign the entirety of Route 210 as an Interstate, I-210 will once again connect to its parent route, but much farther east in Redlands.

The western freeway segment, planned since the 1970s and completed in 2002, replaced a western surface street segment that began with Base Line Road (sometimes spelled Baseline Road) at its intersection with Foothill Boulevard in La Verne and extended eastward into Upland. In Upland, it became 16th Street, then turned northward onto Mountain Avenue, then turned eastward onto 19th Street. It left Upland and continued eastward into Rancho Cucamonga. After Haven Avenue in Rancho Cucamonga, 19th Street curves north, and becomes Highland Avenue, which still exists in some areas although in pieces due to the freeway overlapping onto Highland Avenue, such as the eastbound on and off ramps for Milliken Avenue. Highland Avenue deviates from the original SR 30 alignment at Etiwanda Avenue when it curves south and ends at East Avenue, the border of Rancho Cucamonga and Fontana. Highland Avenue starts again at Cherry Avenue, east of the I-15 and continues east, becoming W. Easton Avenue at Alder Avenue. Shortly afterwards, it makes a sharp left curve at Riverside Avenue, crossing over the freeway and becoming Highland Avenue again. From here, it leaves Rialto and goes into San Bernardino. It crosses under SR 210, I-215, and SR 259 before entering the city of Highland. In Highland, the original SR 30 crosses under the 210 one last time and ends as it crosses over SR 330. Some maps still show part of this route as SR 30.

=== State Route 30 ===
State Route 30
- Location: Glendora–Redlands
- Existed: 1933–2007

State Route 30 (SR 30) was the former designation of SR 210 and SR 330. SR 30 ran from its interchange with I-210 in Glendora east to SR 18 at Big Bear Lake. The easternmost portion of SR 30 was transferred to SR 330 in 1972. Thereafter, SR 30 was routed south to I-10 in Redlands. In 1999, the entirety of SR 30 from the Glendora Curve to Redlands was transferred to Route 210.

SR 30 was adopted as a state route in 1933 as part of Legislative Route 190. It was an unsigned highway, running from LRN 9 (formerly US 66, Foothill Blvd) near San Dimas to LRN 26 (SR 38) near Redlands. It also ran from LRN 26 near Redlands to LRN 43 near Big Bear Lake, which would become part of SR 38. During the renumbering of California routes, LRN 190 was split into two different routes. The western portion, between I-210 in San Dimas and Highland became SR 30. The eastern portion, between SR 38 in Redlands and Highland was combined with LRN 207 (currently SR 330) to form SR 106. In 1972, the northern portion of SR 106, between SR 30 and SR 18 would be renumbered SR 330. The southern portion, between SR 30 and I-10 (SR 106 was moved to I-10 in 1965) was combined with SR 30.

Initial freeway construction started in 1968, and constructed the freeway between SR 259 and Cedar Street in San Bernardino. Construction continued east in 1971, which brought the freeway just west of SR 330. Construction did not resume until 1989 which extended the freeway west to I-215. The last phase of construction started in 1992, which connected the route south to I-10.

In 1968, the state requested that SR 30 be incorporated into the Interstate system, but was declined. The next effort started in 1998. The state decided to close the 25-mile (40 km) gap between I-210 and SR 30. It also decided to number the new freeway as SR 210, in preparation of the route becoming an Interstate. Also, when the new freeway was close to the existing route, the entire route would be renumbered SR 210. In addition, the short section of the Orange Freeway, which was numbered I-210, would be renumbered SR 57 to match the number used for the rest of the freeway. Construction started on the eastern end from Foothill Boulevard (exit 47), and slowly moved east. In 2007, the mainline freeway section was completed, which ended the existence of SR 30.

Two non-contiguous sections of road from Juniper Avenue in Fontana to the Southern Pacific railroad bridge, and University Parkway to just east of the Route 210 overpass in San Bernardino along Highland Avenue, Easton Street and Renaissance Parkway, some of which contains former segments of SR 30 and SR 30 Business, is still a state highway with the unsigned designation of Route 210U (for "unrelinquished").

==== State Route 30 Business ====
State Route 30 Business
- Location: Rialto–Highland
- Existed: 1964–2007

State Route 30 Business (SR 30 Bus.) was a business route of SR 30 that existed from 1964 to 2007 along Highland Avenue from Rialto to Highland; it served the city centers of both cities. Its main purpose was to divert traffic from the Foothill Freeway and connect traffic from downtown Rialto to Downtown San Bernardino by street. This business route remained signed at the crossing of Waterman Avenue and Highland Avenue where old, sun-bleached signs were not taken down until 2023.

=== I-215 interchange ===
The final phase of the Foothill Freeway project involved the completion of the interchange with I-215 (exit 74). When the Foothill Freeway mainline was completed in 2007, exit 74 had only four of its six ramps built, missing movements from SR 210 eastbound to I-215 southbound and from I-215 northbound to SR 210 westbound. The flyover plans for these moves had to be recast to address potential soil liquefaction in the event of rupture of existing or undiscovered faults in the area during an earthquake; this project was separated from the main 210 project to avoid delaying the latter. Completion of exit 74 was also tied to the widening of I-215 in the area. The flyover from northbound I-215 to westbound SR 210 opened on December 22, 2011, while the eastbound SR 210 to southbound I-215 opened on July 23, 2012, thus completing the interchange.

== Future ==
Caltrans District 8, in cooperation with the cities of Highland and San Bernardino and the San Manuel Band of Mission Indians, is currently evaluating ways to improve mobility and connectivity to the freeway at and near the Highland Avenue interchange, including a proposal to construct a new interchange to the east at Victoria Avenue.

== Exit list ==
| County | Location | mi | km | Exit | Destinations | Notes |
|---|---|---|---|---|---|---|
| Los Angeles | Los Angeles | 0.00 | 0.00 | 1A | I-5 north (Golden State Freeway) – Sacramento | Western terminus of I-210; I-5 north exit 161, south exit 161A |
| Los Angeles | Los Angeles | 0.00 | 0.00 | — | I-5 Truck north (SR 5S north) to SR 14 | Western terminus of I-210; I-5 north exit 161, south exit 161A |
| Los Angeles | Los Angeles | 0.00 | 0.00 | 1B | I-5 south (Golden State Freeway) – Los Angeles | Western terminus of I-210; I-5 north exit 161, south exit 161A |
| Los Angeles | Los Angeles | 0.84 | 1.35 | 1C | Yarnell Street | Signed as exit 1 eastbound |
| Los Angeles | Los Angeles | 1.92 | 3.09 | 2 | Roxford Street – Sylmar | Serves Olive View–UCLA Medical Center |
| Los Angeles | Los Angeles | 3.28 | 5.28 | 3 | Polk Street | |
| Los Angeles | Los Angeles | 4.11 | 6.61 | 4 | Hubbard Street | |
| Los Angeles | Los Angeles | 4.94 | 7.95 | 5 | Maclay Street – San Fernando | |
| Los Angeles | Los Angeles | 5.91 | 9.51 | 6A | SR 118 west (Ronald Reagan Freeway) – Ventura | Signed as exit 6B westbound; eastern terminus of SR 118; SR 118 east exits 46A-B |
| Los Angeles | Los Angeles | 6.00 | 9.66 | 6B | Paxton Street | Signed as exit 6A westbound |
| Los Angeles | Los Angeles | 7.82 | 12.59 | 8 | Osborne Street / Foothill Boulevard | |
| Los Angeles | Los Angeles | 9.43 | 15.18 | 9 | Wheatland Avenue – Lake View Terrace | |
| Los Angeles | Los Angeles | 11.08 | 17.83 | 11 | Sunland Boulevard – Sunland, Tujunga | |
| Los Angeles | Los Angeles | 14.17 | 22.80 | 14 | La Tuna Canyon Road | |
| Los Angeles | Glendale | 15.62 | 25.14 | 16 | Lowell Avenue – Tujunga | |
| Los Angeles | Glendale | 16.77 | 26.99 | 17A | Pennsylvania Avenue – La Crescenta | Signed as exit 17 eastbound |
| Los Angeles | La Crescenta-Montrose | 17.40 | 28.00 | 17B | La Crescenta Avenue – La Crescenta | Westbound exit and eastbound entrance |
| Los Angeles | La Crescenta-Montrose | 18.22 | 29.32 | 18 | Ocean View Boulevard – Montrose | |
| Los Angeles | La Cañada Flintridge | 18.88 | 30.38 | 19 | SR 2 south (Glendale Freeway) – Los Angeles | Western end of SR 2 concurrency; SR 2 north exits 21A-B |
| Los Angeles | La Cañada Flintridge | 19.88 | 31.99 | 20 | SR 2 east (Angeles Crest Highway) – La Cañada Flintridge | Eastern end of SR 2 concurrency |
| Los Angeles | La Cañada Flintridge | 20.60 | 33.15 | 21 | Gould Avenue | Eastbound exit and westbound entrance |
| Los Angeles | La Cañada Flintridge | 20.60 | 33.15 | 21 | Foothill Boulevard | Westbound exit and eastbound entrance |
| Los Angeles | La Cañada Flintridge | 21.53 | 34.65 | 22A | Berkshire Avenue / Oak Grove Drive | |
| Los Angeles | Pasadena | 22.49 | 36.19 | 22B | Arroyo Boulevard / Windsor Avenue | |
| Los Angeles | Pasadena | 23.19 | 37.32 | 23 | Lincoln Avenue / Washington Boulevard | |
| Los Angeles | Pasadena | 24.06 | 38.72 | 24 | Seco Street / Mountain Street | |
| Los Angeles | Pasadena | 24.96 | 40.17 | 25A | Colorado Boulevard / Del Mar Boulevard / California Boulevard (SR 710) – Pasadena | Eastbound left exit and westbound left entrance |
| Los Angeles | Pasadena | 24.96 | 40.17 | 25B | SR 134 west (Ventura Freeway) – Ventura | Eastbound exit and westbound entrance; eastern terminus of SR 134; SR 134 east exit 13B |
| Los Angeles | Pasadena | 24.96 | 40.17 | 25A | Fair Oaks Avenue south | Westbound exit and eastbound entrance |
| Los Angeles | Pasadena | 24.96 | 40.17 | 25B | Fair Oaks Avenue north / Marengo Avenue | Westbound exit and eastbound entrance |
| Los Angeles | Pasadena | 25.60 | 41.20 | 26A | SR 134 west (Ventura Freeway) to SR 110 / Del Mar Boulevard / California Boulevard (SR 710) – Ventura | Westbound left exit and eastbound left entrance; eastern terminus of SR 134 |
| Los Angeles | Pasadena | 25.60 | 41.20 | ♦ | SR 134 west | HOV access only; westbound exit and eastbound entrance |
| Los Angeles | Pasadena | 26.33 | 42.37 | 26B | Lake Avenue | Signed as exit 26 eastbound |
| Los Angeles | Pasadena | 26.94 | 43.36 | 27A | Hill Avenue | Signed as exit 27 eastbound |
| Los Angeles | Pasadena | 27.41 | 44.11 | 27B | Allen Avenue | Westbound exit and eastbound entrance |
| Los Angeles | Pasadena | 28.25 | 45.46 | 28 | Altadena Drive / Sierra Madre Boulevard | Eastbound exit and westbound entrance |
| Los Angeles | Pasadena | 28.68 | 46.16 | 29A | San Gabriel Boulevard | |
| Los Angeles | Pasadena | 29.29 | 47.14 | 29B | Madre Street | |
| Los Angeles | Pasadena–Arcadia line | 29.80 | 47.96 | 30 | SR 19 south (Rosemead Boulevard) / Michillinda Avenue | Signed as exits 30A (south) and 30B (north) eastbound; northern terminus of SR 19 |
| Los Angeles | Arcadia | 30.82 | 49.60 | 31 | Baldwin Avenue – Sierra Madre | |
| Los Angeles | Arcadia | 31.88 | 51.31 | 32 | Santa Anita Avenue | Serves USC Arcadia Hospital |
| Los Angeles | Monrovia | 32.89 | 52.93 | 33 | Huntington Drive | |
| Los Angeles | Monrovia | 33.91 | 54.57 | 34 | Myrtle Avenue | |
| Los Angeles | Monrovia–Duarte line | 34.74 | 55.91 | 35A | Mountain Avenue | |
| Los Angeles | Duarte | 35.24 | 56.71 | 35B | Buena Vista Street | Trucks over 7 tons prohibited |
| Los Angeles | Irwindale | 36.41– 36.43 | 58.60– 58.63 | 36A-B | I-605 south (San Gabriel River Freeway) / Mount Olive Drive | Signed as exit 36A (I-605) and 36B (Mount Olive Drive); northern terminus of I-605; I-605 exit 27A-B; trucks over 7 tons prohibited on Mount Olive Drive |
| Los Angeles | Irwindale | 37.86 | 60.93 | 38 | Irwindale Avenue | |
| Los Angeles | Azusa | 38.96 | 62.70 | 39 | Vernon Avenue | |
| Los Angeles | Azusa | 39.60 | 63.73 | 40 | SR 39 (Azusa Avenue) | |
| Los Angeles | Azusa | 40.60 | 65.34 | 41 | Citrus Avenue – Covina | |
| Los Angeles | Glendora | 41.59 | 66.93 | 42 | Grand Avenue | Serves Emanate Health – Foothill Presbyterian Hospital |
| Los Angeles | Glendora | 43.16 | 69.46 | 43 | Sunflower Avenue | |
| Los Angeles | Glendora | 44.10 | 70.97 | 44A | SR 57 south (Orange Freeway) – Santa Ana | Eastbound exit and westbound entrance; west end of Glendora Curve; SR 57 is former I-210; northern terminus of SR 57; SR 57 north exit 25C |
| Los Angeles | Glendora | 44.10 | 70.97 | 44B | Lone Hill Avenue | Signed as exit 44 westbound; eastern end of I-210 and western end of SR 210 |
| Los Angeles | Glendora | 44.90 | 72.26 | 45 | SR 57 south (Orange Freeway) – Santa Ana | Westbound exit and eastbound entrance; east end of Glendora Curve; SR 57 is former I-210; northern terminus of SR 57; SR 57 north exit 25B |
| Los Angeles | San Dimas | 45.48 | 73.19 | 46 | San Dimas Avenue | |
| Los Angeles | La Verne | 46.66 | 75.09 | 47 | SR 66 east (Foothill Boulevard) – La Verne | Western terminus of SR 66; former US 66 |
| Los Angeles | La Verne | 48.06 | 77.35 | 48 | Fruit Street | |
| Los Angeles | Claremont | 49.57 | 79.78 | 50 | Towne Avenue | |
| Los Angeles | Claremont | 51.91 | 83.54 | 52 | Base Line Road | Former SR 30 |
| San Bernardino | Upland | 53.65 | 86.34 | 54 | Mountain Avenue – Mount Baldy | |
| San Bernardino | Upland | 55.64 | 89.54 | 56 | Campus Avenue | Serves San Antonio Regional Hospital |
| San Bernardino | Rancho Cucamonga | 56.75 | 91.33 | 57 | Carnelian Street | |
| San Bernardino | Rancho Cucamonga | 58.05 | 93.42 | 58 | Archibald Avenue | |
| San Bernardino | Rancho Cucamonga | 59.06 | 95.05 | 59 | Haven Avenue | |
| San Bernardino | Rancho Cucamonga | 60.06 | 96.66 | 60 | Milliken Avenue | |
| San Bernardino | Rancho Cucamonga | 61.31 | 98.67 | 61 | Day Creek Boulevard | |
| San Bernardino | Rancho Cucamonga–Fontana line | 63.80 | 102.68 | 64A | I-15 (Ontario Freeway) – Barstow, San Diego | I-15 exits 115A-B |
| San Bernardino | Fontana | 64.08 | 103.13 | 64B | Cherry Avenue | |
| San Bernardino | Fontana | | | ♦ | Beech Avenue | HOV access only |
| San Bernardino | Fontana | 66.08 | 106.35 | 66 | Citrus Avenue | |
| San Bernardino | Fontana | 67.08 | 107.95 | 67 | Sierra Avenue | |
| San Bernardino | Rialto | 68.18 | 109.73 | 68 | Alder Avenue | |
| San Bernardino | Rialto | 69.54 | 111.91 | 70 | Ayala Drive | |
| San Bernardino | Rialto | 71.15 | 114.50 | 71 | Riverside Avenue | |
| San Bernardino | Rialto | 71.82 | 115.58 | 72 | Pepper Avenue | |
| San Bernardino | San Bernardino | 72.84 | 117.22 | 73 | State Street / University Parkway | |
| San Bernardino | San Bernardino | 74.02 | 119.12 | 74 | I-215 north – Barstow | Former I-15E north; I-215 south exits 46A-C |
| San Bernardino | San Bernardino | 74.02 | 119.12 | 74 | I-215 south – Riverside | Eastbound exit and westbound entrance; westbound access is via exit 75B; former I-15E south; I-215 north exit 46B |
| San Bernardino | San Bernardino | 75.09 | 120.85 | 75A | H Street | Signed as exit 75 eastbound |
| San Bernardino | San Bernardino | 75.25 | 121.10 | 75B | To I-215 south (SR 259 south) – Riverside | Eastbound access is via exit 74; I-215 north exit 45 |
| San Bernardino | San Bernardino | 76.37 | 122.91 | 76 | SR 18 north (Waterman Avenue) | Southern (clockwise) terminus of SR 18; serves Dignity Health – St. Bernardine Medical Center |
| San Bernardino | San Bernardino | 77.87 | 125.32 | 78 | Del Rosa Avenue | |
| San Bernardino | San Bernardino | 78.88 | 126.95 | 79 | Highland Avenue | |
| San Bernardino | San Bernardino | 80.89 | 130.18 | 81 | SR 330 north – Running Springs, Big Bear Lake | Southern terminus of SR 330 |
| San Bernardino | Highland | 81.47 | 131.11 | 82 | Base Line Street | |
| San Bernardino | Highland | 82.38 | 132.58 | 83 | 5th Street / Greenspot Road | |
| San Bernardino | Redlands | 84.49 | 135.97 | 84 | San Bernardino Avenue | |
| San Bernardino | Redlands | 85.31 | 137.29 | 85A | I-10 west – Los Angeles | Eastern terminus of SR 210; I-10 east exit 77B, west exit 77C |
| San Bernardino | Redlands | 85.31 | 137.29 | 85B | I-10 east – Indio | Eastern terminus of SR 210; I-10 east exit 77B, west exit 77C |
1.000 mi = 1.609 km; 1.000 km = 0.621 mi: Concurrency terminus; HOV only; Incomplete access; Route transition
