= Huntington Drive =

United States street in Los Angeles

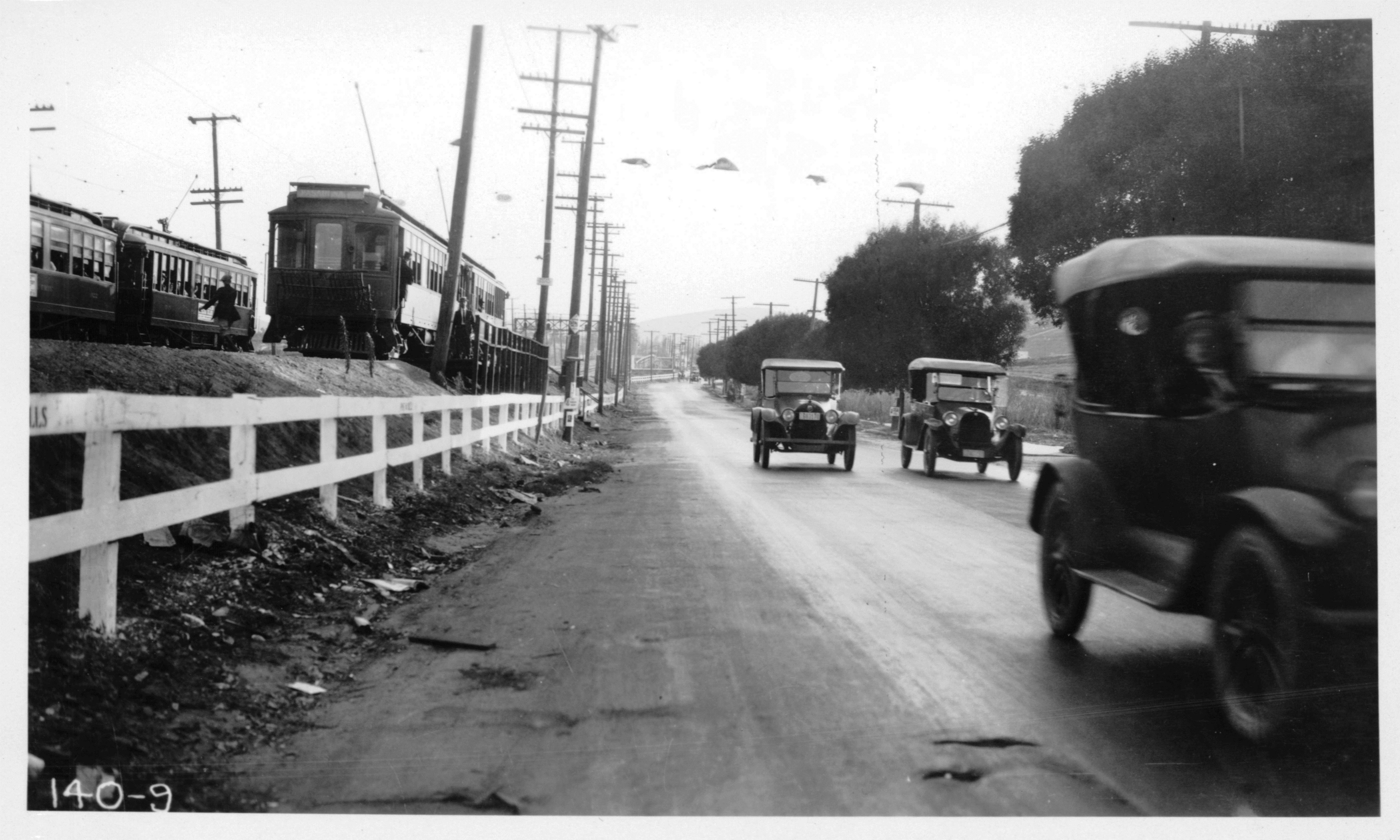
- Namesake: Henry E. Huntington
- Length: 16.4 mi (26.4 km)
- Location: Los Angeles County, California, United States
- West end: Mission Road / Soto Street in Los Angeles
- Major junctions: I-210 in Monrovia; I-605 at the Irwindale–Duarte line
- East end: Foothill Boulevard at the Azusa–Irwindale line

Huntington Drive is a major thoroughfare that begins in the Rose Hills community in Los Angeles and heads east-northeast to Irwindale. The street was named after railroad magnate Henry E. Huntington. It also served as one of the only thoroughfares between Los Angeles and Pasadena in the early 1900s. Portions of Huntington Drive were part of the National Old Trails Road and U.S. Route 66. The road has a wide median that was originally one of the lines of the Pacific Electric Railway, the Monrovia–Glendora Line.

== Route description ==
Huntington Drive begins at Soto Street in Lincoln Heights. South of Soto Street the road is Mission Road. The street heads north but quickly heads northeast through El Sereno, Los Angeles and then into South Pasadena, California. In South Pasadena, Huntington Drive intersects with Fair Oaks Avenue. The portion from Soto Street to Fair Oaks was part of the original routing for US 66. Past South Pasadena, Huntington continues through San Marino, California and passes just south of the Huntington Library. The road then goes through East San Gabriel, California and then Arcadia, California where it merges with Colorado Boulevard near Santa Anita Park. At this junction, Huntington Drive becomes another portion of US 66, passing through Monrovia, California and Duarte, California until Irwindale where it continues as Foothill Boulevard.

== History ==
Huntington Drive was the major route between Los Angeles and Pasadena in the early 1900s until the opening of the Arroyo Seco Parkway. The median contained the Monrovia–Glendora Line of the Pacific Electric Railway which was owned by the street's namesake, Henry Huntington. When the line discontinued service in 1951, the large median became a large lawn with trees, and the roadways either side of the median were reconfigured from bidirectional traffic to one-way traffic. Additionally, the main roadway between Soto Street and Eastern Avenue was shifted to the former rail right-of-way, with the former north and south roadways relegated to frontage road or side street status.

In the 1930s, traveling on Huntington would have drove you by the Cawston Ostrich Farm in South Pasadena and in Monrovia a hot dog stand, the first restaurant opened by the McDonald brothers who would later create the fast-food restaurant McDonald's. Huntington Drive between Soto Street and Fair Oaks Avenue was the original alignment of US 66 from 1926 until around 1936 when it was re-routed to eventually the Arroyo Seco Parkway. Between Colorado Boulevard east to the Irwindale city limit it was signed as US 66 until it was decommissioned. The city of Duarte stenciled Route 66 logos onto the street in 2017 to commemorate the city's 60th anniversary.

== Major intersections ==
Location	mi	km	Destinations	Notes
Los Angeles	0.0	0.0	Mission Road / Soto Street	Western terminus
Los Angeles–Alhambra line	2.6– 2.8	4.2– 4.5	Main Street	
South Pasadena	3.5	5.6	Fair Oaks Avenue	
San Marino–Alhambra line	4.4	7.1	Garfield Avenue	
San Marino–Alhambra line	4.4	7.1	Atlantic Boulevard	
East Pasadena–East San Gabriel line	8.4	13.5	Rosemead Boulevard (SR 164)	
Arcadia	2.8	4.5	Colorado Place west to Colorado Boulevard	Westbound exit and eastbound entrance
Monrovia	11.9	19.2	I-210 (Foothill Freeway) – Pasadena, San Bernardino	I-210 exit 33
Irwindale	15.4	24.8	I-605 south (San Gabriel River Freeway) to I-210 (Foothill Freeway)	Northern terminus of I-605; I-605 exit 27C
Azusa–Irwindale line	16.4	26.4	Foothill Boulevard east (Historic US 66 east)	Eastern terminus; road continues eastward as Foothill Boulevard; former US 66
1.000 mi = 1.609 km; 1.000 km = 0.621 mi

== See also ==
- List of streets in the San Gabriel Valley
