= Mission Drive =

Mission Drive is a generic street name. It may refer to:

== United States ==
By state, then city:

- Mission Drive (Howard County), Arkansas
- Mission Drive (Los Angeles County), California
- Mission Drive (Santa Barbara County), California
- Mission Drive (Johnson County), Kansas
- Mission Drive (Cole County), Missouri
- Mission Drive (Oglala Lakota County), South Dakota

== See also ==
- Mission Road
