= Los Alamitos =

Los Alamitos ("The Little Cottonwoods" in Spanish) can mean:

- Los Alamitos, California, a city in Orange County, California
  - Los Alamitos High School
  - Los Alamitos Army Airfield
  - Los Alamitos Race Course
- Los Alamitos Circle, the roundabout at the intersection of Pacific Coast Highway and Lakewood Blvd. in Long Beach, California
- Los Alamitos Creek in San Jose, California
- Los Alamitos Formation in Río Negro Province, Patagonia, Argentina, known for its Late Cretaceous fossils
