= Blossom Market Hall =

Food hall in San Gabriel, California

- Location: San Gabriel, California
- Coordinates: 34.098949°N 118.109047°W
- Address: 264 S. Mission Drive
- Opened: December 2021; 4 years ago
- Num. of stores: 13
- Floor area: 11,000 square feet (1,000 m^{2})
- Floors: 2
- Website: www.blossommarkethall.com

Blossom Market Hall is a food hall located in the San Gabriel Mission District of San Gabriel, California, on Mission Drive. Blossom Market Hall opened in December 2021 by Nellie and Chris Tran. The food hall occupies a historic former Masonic lodge, which was built in 1949, and houses thirteen food stalls that offer a diverse array of cuisines. The food hall's name acknowledges purple jacaranda trees grown in the San Gabriel Valley.

== Background ==
The food hall comprises 9,000 square feet (840 m^{2}) of retail space on the first floor, and an additional 2,000 square feet (190 m^{2}) of meeting and art gallery space on the second floor. The food hall's ceiling includes a mural of California wildflowers, which was designed by Nao Miyamoto.

== See also ==
- Food hall
- San Gabriel, California
