= Henninger Flats =

Small hanging basin in the San Gabriel Mountains, California

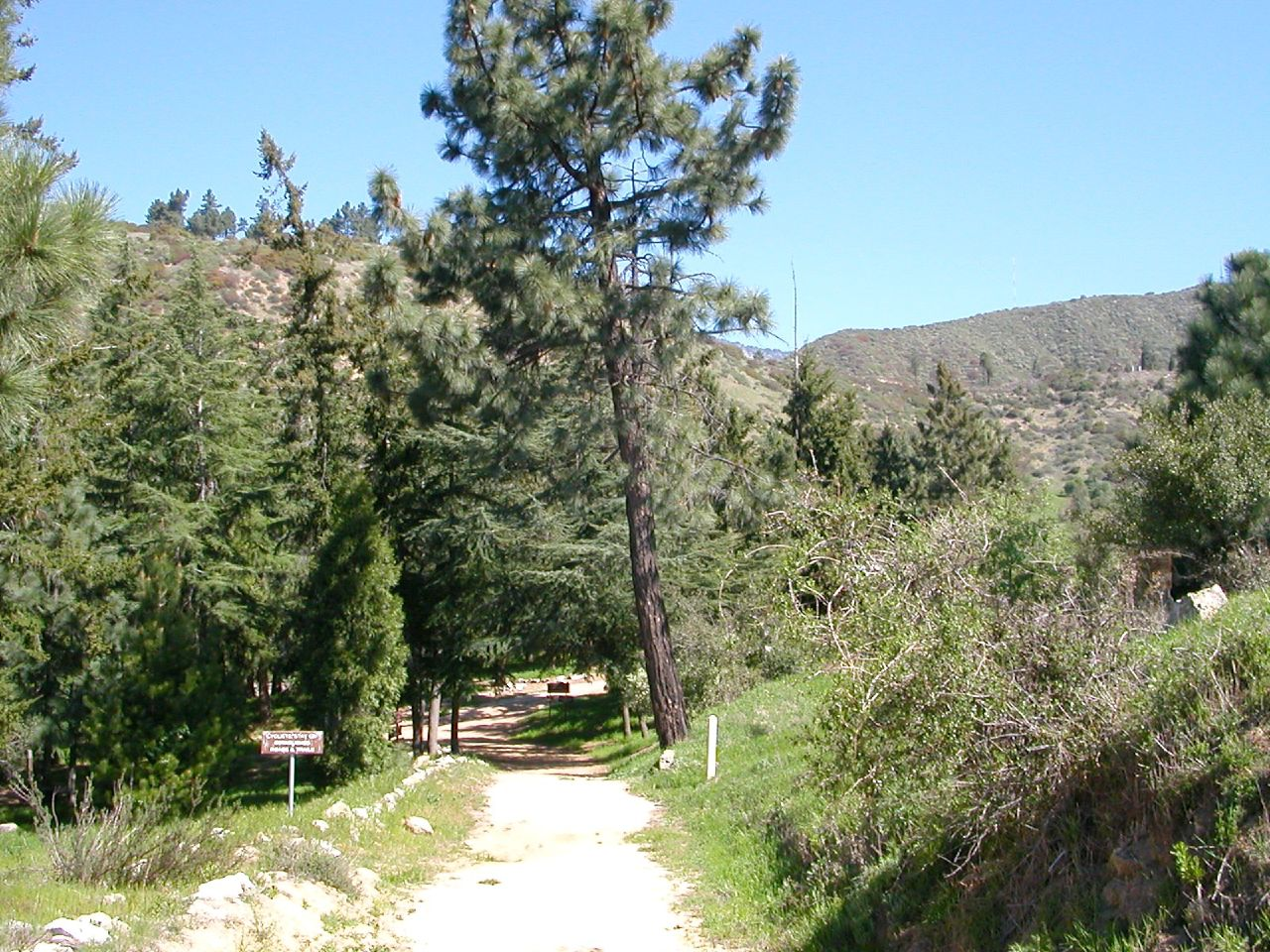
- Henninger Flats
- Interactive map of Henninger Flats
- Coordinates: 34.1925°N 118.087°W
- Country: United States
- State: California
- Location: Angeles National Forest

Henninger Flats is a small hanging basin 2,600 feet (792.5 m) above sea level in the San Gabriel Mountains in the Angeles National Forest. It was part of the Mount Wilson Toll Road. The trailhead to reach the flats is at the top end of Eaton Canyon in Pasadena, California.

== History ==
The site was originally inhabited by the Gabrieleno people, and was known as Clara's Basin.

Around 1880, William K. Henninger settled in a small basin above Altadena. Henninger was born in Virginia and had been a gold prospector. The area was originally purchased by Mr. Peter Stiel through the Homestead Act. Stiel's friend Henninger had been squatting on the area since 1884.

Henninger was given the title captain by the other miners he worked with as a sign of respect. Henninger married an Indigenous California woman known as Teresa. Their firstborn, a son named Natividad, was baptized at the San Gabriel Mission in December 1858. They had three daughters: Louisa, Susana, and Jesefa. Louisa Henniger had three children by David de la Ossa, son of Rita de Guillen de la Ossa, daughter of Eulalia Perez de Guillen Marine, keeper of the keys at Mission San Gabriel (less than eight miles due south).

William K. Henninger built a house and a cistern for water storage. He planted fruit, vegetables, and nut trees and harvested hay. The produce he carried into town, a mile and a half down the steep trail that ended in Eaton Canyon. In 1892, Henninger was visited by T. P. Lukens and R. J. Busch, who started the very first experimental reforestation in California at Henninger Flats. Upon his death in March 1894, the property was willed to his daughters. The property was auctioned in 1895 to Harry C. and Harriet M. Allen of nearby Pasadena. In October 1895, the Allens sold the property for $5,000 to four men who then sold the property to the Mt. Wilson Toll Road Company for $76,600 as part of the Mount Wilson Toll Road.

In 1903, under the direction of Lukens, a nursery was established at Henninger Flats. During the years that followed the road was widened to accommodate the passage of equipment up to the observatory at Mt. Wilson. By 1917 the road was widened to the present width of twelve feet.

Since 1928, the flats have been used as a high elevation forest nursery by the Los Angeles County Fire Department.

== Hiking ==
The road is a popular hike and the flats were a popular campground. The Henninger Flats Forestry Center is also used for conservation education. The toll road was washed out by a landslide in 2005 approximately 200 yards (182.9 m) past the Eaton Canyon bridge, but was re-opened in early September 2009 as the result of fire crews needing vehicular access to the area while fighting the Station Fire.

Henninger Flats was destroyed by the 2025 Eaton Fire. Most of the historic artifacts had already been moved to the L.A. County Fairgrounds.

== Gallery ==
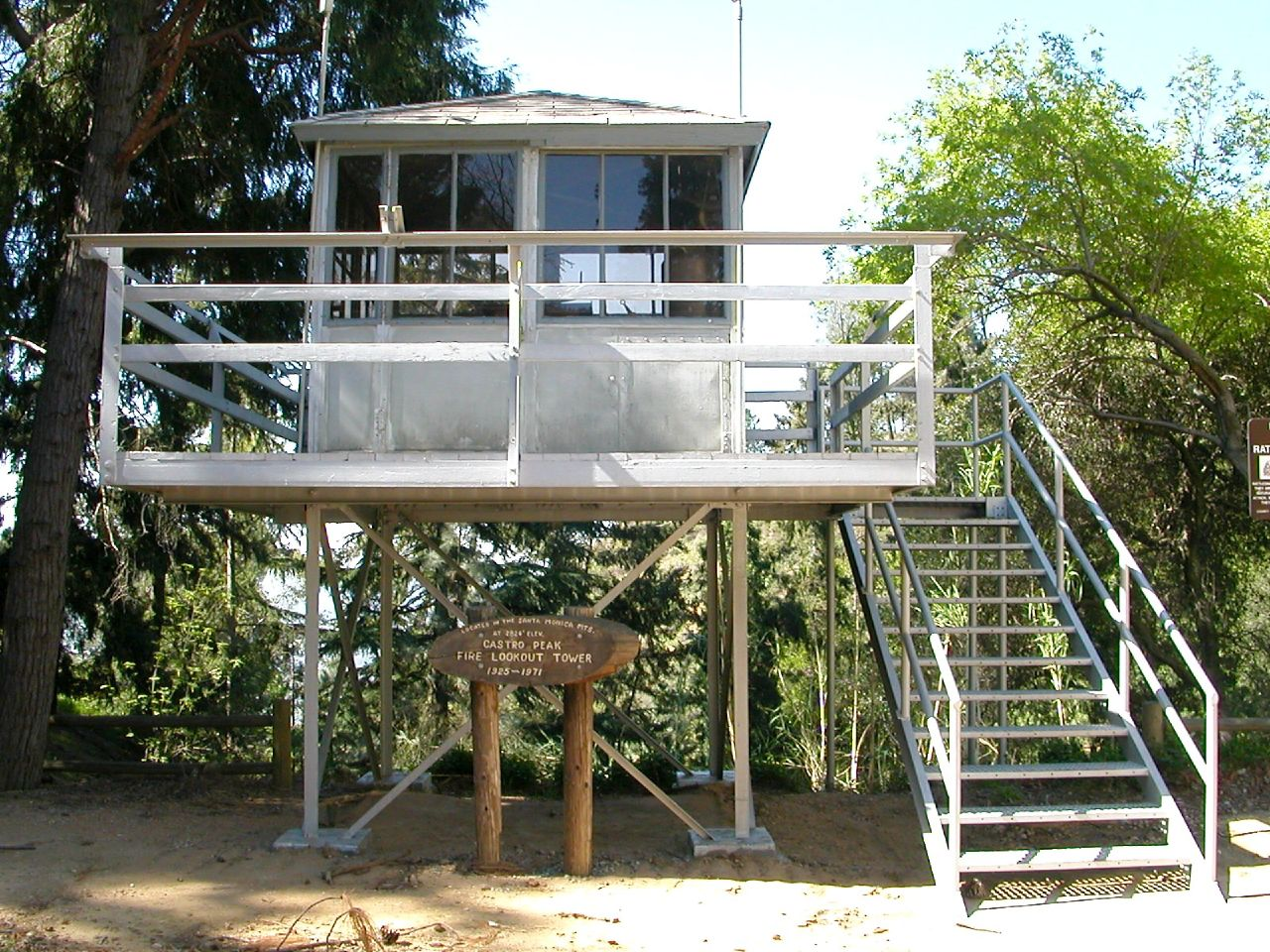
Castro Peak fire tower

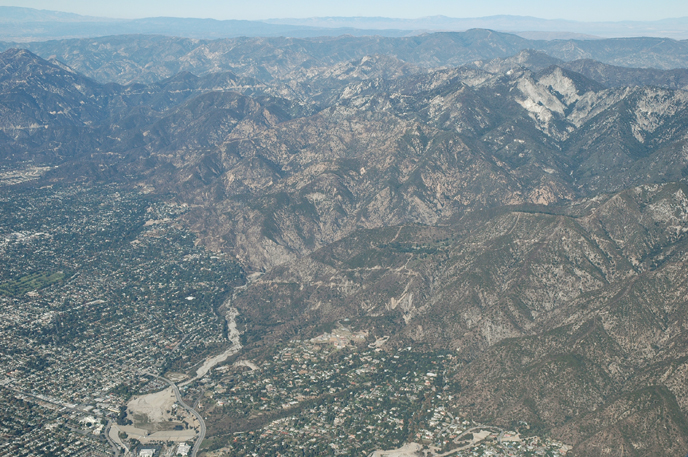
Eaton Canyon (Henninger flats in background)

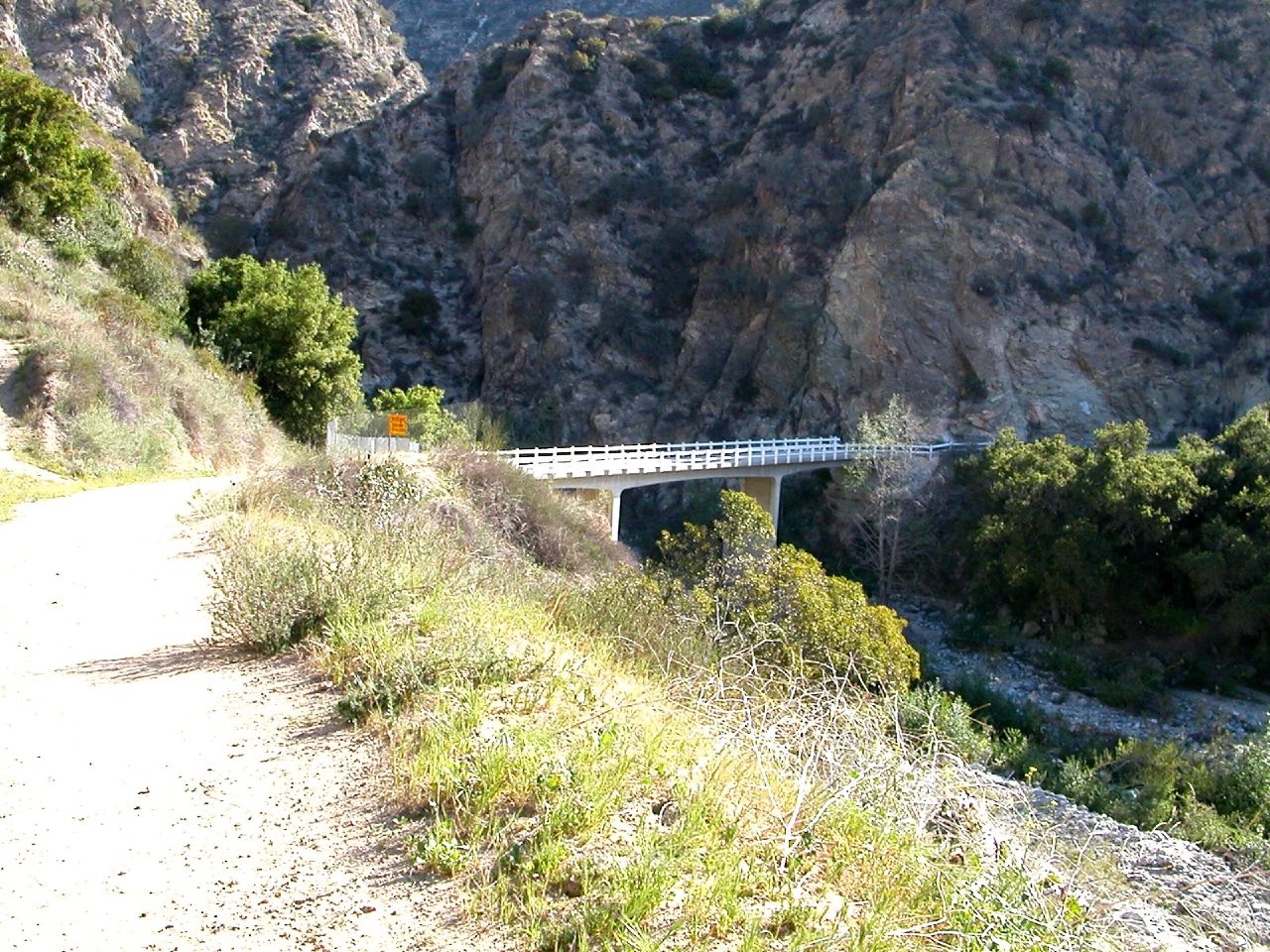
Mt. Wilson Toll Road trail head at 34.19189°N 118.1044°W

== See also ==
- Angeles National Forest Fire Lookout Association
- Eulalia Perez de Guillen Marine
- Mission San Gabriel
