= California State Route 19 =

State highway in California

State Route 19
- SR 19 in red, SR 164 in purple, former segments in gray

Route information
- Maintained by Caltrans
- Length: 8.53 mi (13.73 km) Length of SR 164 is 5.69 mi (9 km) (portions of these routes have been relinquished to or are otherwise maintained by local or other governments, and are not included in the length.)
- Existed: 1934–present

Major junctions
- South end: Rose Street at the Lakewood–Bellflower line
- SR 91 near Bellflower; I-105 near Downey; I-5 in Downey; SR 60 near South El Monte; I-10 near El Monte; I-210 in Pasadena
- North end: Foothill Boulevard in Pasadena

Location
- Country: United States
- State: California
- Counties: Los Angeles

Highway system
- State highways in California; Interstate; US; State; Scenic; History; Pre‑1964; Unconstructed; Deleted; Freeways
← SR 18	→ SR 20
← SR 163	SR 164	→ SR 165

State Route 19 (SR 19) is a state highway in the U.S. state of California, running along Lakewood Boulevard and Rosemead Boulevard in the Los Angeles area. An additional "hidden" state highway, State Route 164 (SR 164), is also signed as part of SR 19, despite having a legal description separate from Route 19. The combined route is a north–south four-to-eight lane suburban roadway, lying east of the Long Beach Freeway (Interstate 710) and west of the San Gabriel River Freeway (Interstate 605), and connecting the eastern parts of Long Beach and Pasadena via the Whittier Narrows. Under their legal descriptions, SR 19 runs north to Gallatin Road in Pico Rivera, then SR 164 goes from Gallatin Road to Pasadena. Since 1998, control of several pieces have been relinquished to local governments, and more transfers are authorized by state law, though some maps and signs may still mark SR 19/164 as continuous through these cities.

== Route description ==
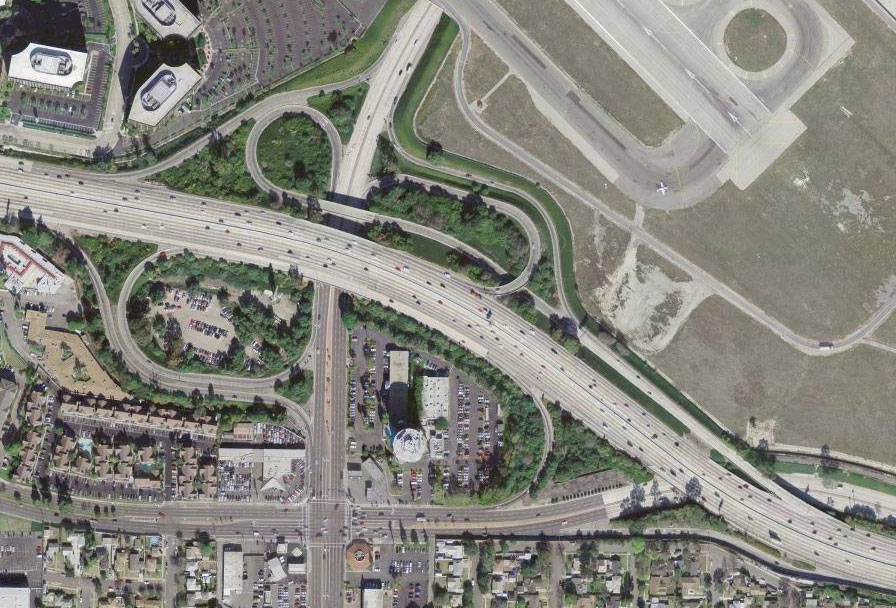
Lakewood Boulevard passing under I-405 and the Long Beach Airport (top of image)

Locals generally refer to the combined SR 19/164 route as either Lakewood Boulevard or Rosemead Boulevard, not by its numerical designation. The two highways are part of the National Highway System, a network of highways that are considered essential to the country's economy, defense, and mobility by the Federal Highway Administration.

The original official southern terminus of SR 19 was at the Los Alamitos Circle in Long Beach, where Lakewood Boulevard, State Route 1 (Pacific Coast Highway), and Los Coyotes Diagonal converge. SR 19 then proceeded north along Lakewood Boulevard through Long Beach and the City of Lakewood, intersecting with Interstate 405, passing under a runway of the Long Beach Airport (the part through the airport has been relocated to the east; parts of the old alignment remain as airport service roads), then running to the west of Lakewood Center Mall before passing through the neighborhood of Mayfair.

Since the California Legislature relinquished segments of the highway, state control of SR 19 now officially begins at the point where Lakewood Boulevard crosses the Lakewood–Bellflower city limits at Rose Street (SR 19 in Bellflower is also planned to be relinquished by the state). SR 19 then intersects State Route 91 before straddling the city border between Bellflower and Paramount and later Bellflower and Downey. State control of SR 19 then ends north of Gardendale Street when Lakewood Boulevard fully enters into Downey.

Lakewood Boulevard continues north through Downey, intersecting with Interstate 105 before passing by the large site formerly occupied by North American Aviation, Rockwell International and Boeing Reusable Space Systems and interchanging with Interstate 5. At Telegraph Road at the Downey-Pico Rivera city limits, Lakewood Boulevard turns into Rosemead Boulevard. Rosemead Boulevard continues north through Pico Rivera (where this segment of SR 19 has been relinquished to the city as well) to Gallatin Road.

The hidden SR 164, but signed as part of SR 19, begins north of Gallatin Road, traveling along Rosemead Boulevard across Whittier Narrows Dam before entering the Whittier Narrows Recreation Area and intersecting with State Route 60. After this, the road enters South El Monte before crossing the Rio Hondo and straddling the city boundary between Rosemead and El Monte. It then intersects with Interstate 10. This portion of Rosemead Boulevard between Gallatin Road and Interstate 10 is still maintained by the state and built to expressway standards.

State maintenance ends again at the Rosemead–Temple City city limits near Grand Avenue. Rosemead Boulevard then continues north through Temple City and the unincorporated areas of East San Gabriel and East Pasadena and into the City of Pasadena. (The highway was relinquished to Temple City, and those portions in the unincorporated areas were transferred to Los Angeles County.) In Pasadena, the state still maintains the short portion of Rosemead Boulevard from Interstate 210 to Foothill Boulevard, with SR 164's legal northern terminus at the latter. Rosemead Boulevard continues northwest under Pasadena's control from Foothill Boulevard to Sierra Madre Villa Avenue.

Bus service is provided by Metro Local line 266 (between Foothill Boulevard and Del Amo Boulevard) and Long Beach Transit line 111 (south of Del Amo Boulevard) throughout Rosemead Boulevard and Lakewood Boulevard. The Metro C Line is also provided by a station in the median of Interstate 105 under Lakewood Boulevard.

== History ==
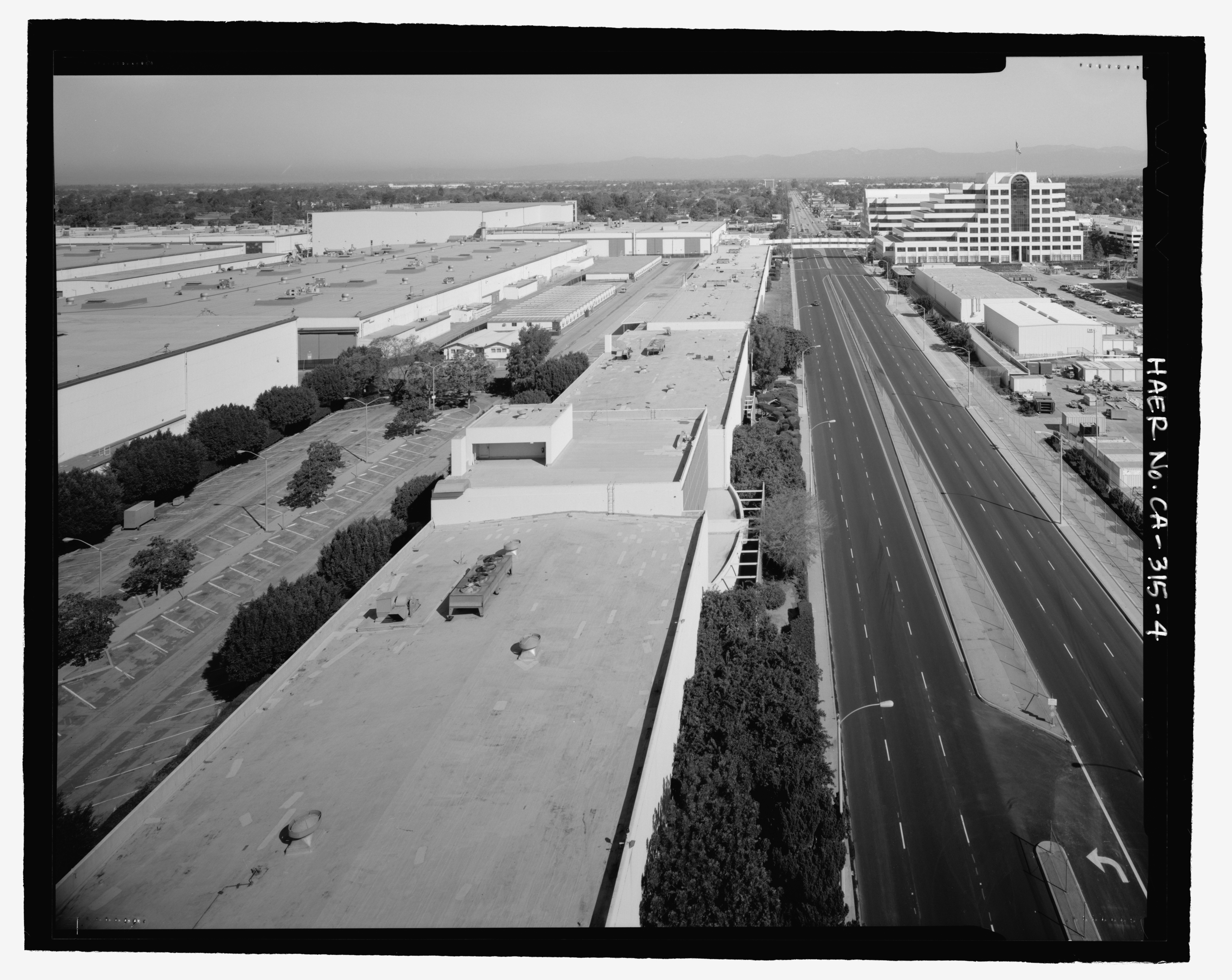
Former Douglas, McDonnell Douglas and Boeing facilities along Lakewood Boulevard in Long Beach, 2002

Before the present SR 19 was constructed, San Gabriel Boulevard, which extended from Lamanda Park south to Downey, and was widened and repaved by an assessment tax in 1925, was the main road through the Whittier Narrows, requiring several turns to stay on it and to continue south to Long Beach. The state legislature added Route 168 to the state highway system in 1933, which followed this general alignment between Route 60 (SR 1) in Long Beach and Route 9 (Foothill Boulevard, then US 66) near Lamanda Park. SR 19 was later designated out of the 1964 state highway renumbering.

State Route 164
- Location: Pico Rivera–Pasadena
- Length: 9.56 mi (15.39 km)
- Existed: 1964–present

The 9.56-mile (15.39 km) piece of SR 19 north of Gallatin Road in Pico Rivera has legally been State Route 164 since the 1964 renumbering, but has always been signed as SR 19. Original plans for SR 164 took it southeast to Interstate 605 from the present transition between SR 164 and SR 19, and it was originally planned as the Rio Hondo Freeway.

Many segments of SR 19 have since been relinquished to the cities that they run through. Caltrans relinquished Long Beach's portion of SR 19 to the city on January 27, 1999, and Downey's segment of SR 19 was relinquished to the city on July 3, 2001. However, the segment in Pico Rivera was not relinquished to that city until June 22, 2004. On October 27, 2006, the northern portion of SR 164 that went through an unincorporated area of the county from Callita Street to I-210 was relinquished to the county. In April 2008, the section of SR 164 through Temple City was relinquished to that city. On April 9, 2012, the section of SR 19 through Lakewood was relinquished to that city. In 2017, the relinquishment process in Bellflower began.

== Major intersections ==
Except where prefixed with a letter, postmiles were measured on the road as it was in 1964, based on the alignment that existed at the time, and do not necessarily reflect current mileage. Postmile prefixes include: R reflecting a realignment in the route since then, M indicating a second realignment, L referring to an overlap due to a correction or change, and T indicating postmiles classified as temporary. Segments that remain unconstructed or have been relinquished to local control may be omitted. The entire route is in Los Angeles County.

Location	Postmile	Destinations	Notes
Long Beach	0.00 (Note: Postmiles are measured from SR 19's original southern end at SR 1, before that segment north to Rose Avenue was deleted and relinquished to local control.)	SR 1 (Pacific Coast Highway) / Los Coyotes Diagonal – Newport Beach, Long Beach, Bellflower	Los Alamitos Traffic Circle; original south end of SR 19; former US 101 Alt.
Long Beach	1.06	I-405 (San Diego Freeway) – San Diego, Santa Monica	I-405 exit 27; interchange; former SR 7
Long Beach	1.97	Donald Douglas Drive to Long Beach Airport / Wardlow Road	
Long Beach–Lakewood line	2.97	Carson Street	Former SR 214; serves Long Beach City College
Long Beach–Lakewood line	3.98	Del Amo Boulevard	
Lakewood–Bellflower line	5.53	Rose Street	Southern end of state maintenance on SR 19
Bellflower	5.89	Artesia Boulevard – Bellflower, Long Beach	Former SR 91
Bellflower	6.05	SR 91 (Artesia Freeway) – Riverside, Manhattan Beach	SR 91 east exit 15, west exit 15A; interchange
Paramount–Downey line	8.37	Gardendale Street	Northern end of state maintenance on SR 19
Downey	8.57	I-105 (Century Freeway) – Norwalk, LAX Airport	I-105 exit 16; interchange
Downey	8.89	Imperial Highway	Former SR 90
Downey	10.22	Bellflower Boulevard	Former Legislative Route 169 (1933–1945)
Downey	10.38	Firestone Boulevard	Former SR 42
Downey	12.08	I-5 (Santa Ana Freeway) – Santa Ana, Los Angeles	I-5 exit 125; interchange; former US 101 Bypass south
Downey–Pico Rivera line	12.31	Telegraph Road	North end of Lakewood Boulevard; south end of Rosemead Boulevard; former US 101 Bypass north / SR 26
Pico Rivera	13.06	Slauson Avenue	
Pico Rivera	14.02	Washington Boulevard	
Pico Rivera	15.52	Whittier Boulevard – Whittier, Montebello	Former SR 72
Pico Rivera	16.64 1.39 (Note: Indicates that the postmile represents the distance along SR 164 rather than SR 19.)	Gallatin Road	Southern end of state maintenance on SR 164
South El Monte	2.41	San Gabriel Boulevard, Durfee Avenue	
South El Monte	3.34	SR 60 (Pomona Freeway) – Pomona, Los Angeles	SR 60 exit 10A; interchange
South El Monte	4.81	Garvey Avenue – El Monte, Monterey Park	Former US 60/US 70/US 99
El Monte–Rosemead line	5.60	I-10 (San Bernardino Freeway) – San Bernardino, Los Angeles	I-10 exit 26B; interchange
Rosemead	6.22	Valley Boulevard – El Monte, Los Angeles	Former SR 212
Rosemead–Temple City line	6.89	Northern end of state maintenance on SR 164	
Temple City	7.78	Las Tunas Drive	
Temple City	8.78	Callita Street	
East San Gabriel–East Pasadena line	9.65	Huntington Drive	
East Pasadena	10.74	Colorado Boulevard	Former SR 248 (US 66 post-1933)
Pasadena	10.76	I-210 (Foothill Freeway) – San Bernardino, Pasadena	I-210 exit 30; interchange; southern end of state maintenance
Pasadena	10.95	Foothill Boulevard	Northern end of state maintenance; former Route 210 (US 66 pre-1933)
1.000 mi = 1.609 km; 1.000 km = 0.621 mi: Route transition

== See also ==
- List of streets in the San Gabriel Valley
