= List of streets in the San Gabriel Valley =

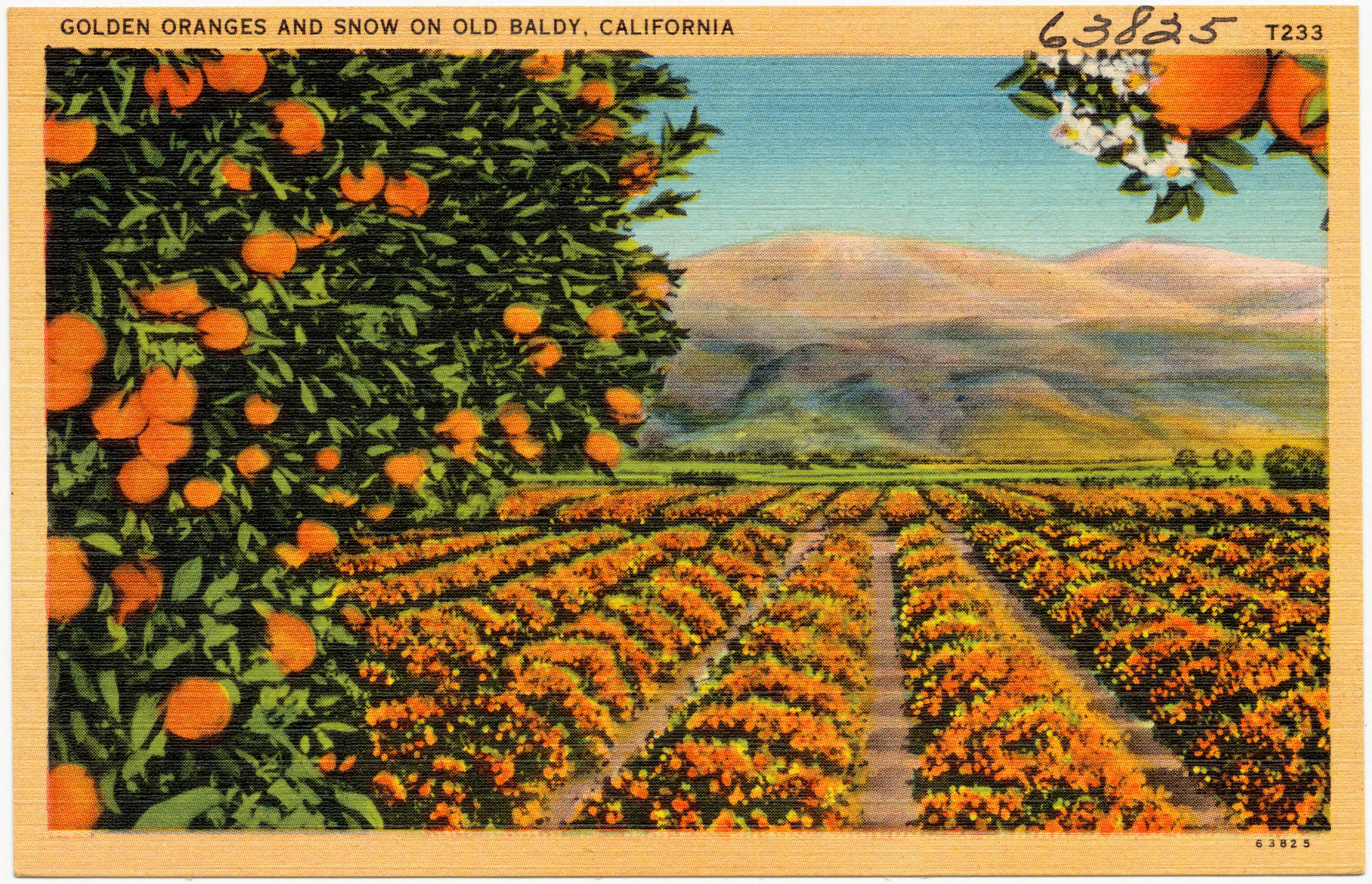
List of streets in the San Gabriel Valley

This is a list of streets in San Gabriel Valley, California. They are grouped by type: arterial thoroughfares, commercial corridors, and other streets.

== Arterial thoroughfares ==
=== Atlantic Boulevard ===
Atlantic Boulevard starts at Randolph Street in Maywood, as a northern continuation of Atlantic Avenue, which is itself a continuation of Los Robles Avenue. The entire 30.3-mile (48.8 km) route runs from Ocean Boulevard in Long Beach to Huntington Drive in Pasadena. It passes through Vernon, Commerce, Eastside Los Angeles, East Los Angeles, Monterey Park, and Alhambra.

=== Garfield Avenue ===
Garfield Avenue starts in the city of Paramount as a northern continuation of Cherry Avenue. It runs north through Bell Gardens, Commerce, Montebello, Monterey Park, and Alhambra before terminating in South Pasadena.

=== Garvey Avenue ===
Garvey Avenue runs east from Ramona Boulevard in Alhambra to Monterey Park, Rosemead, before terminating at Durfee Avenue and the San Bernardino Freeway in El Monte.

=== Huntington Drive ===
Huntington Drive heads about 16.4 miles (26.4 km) east from Mission Road and Soto Street in Los Angeles to |Foothill Boulevard at the Azusa–Irwindale line. Portions of Huntington Drive follow the historic U.S. Route 66.

=== Sierra Madre Boulevard ===
Sierra Madre Boulevard runs about 6.6 miles (10.6 km) between Huntington Drive in San Marino and Elvado Avenue in Pasadena, passing through Sierra Madre and Arcadia.

=== Valley Boulevard ===
Valley Boulevard runs east from Main Street and Mission Road in Los Angeles to the Chino Valley Freeway in Pomona, where it then continues east as Holt Avenue to the San Bernardino Freeway in Ontario. Another segment of Valley Boulevard then splits from the freeway in Fontana, heading east to Sperry Drive in Colton.

== Commercial corridors ==
- San Bernardino Freeway (I-10)
- Foothill Freeway (I-210)
- Angeles Crest Highway (SR 2)
- Rosemead Boulevard (SR 19)
- Azusa Avenue (SR 39)
- Pomona Freeway (SR 60)
- Arroyo Seco Parkway (SR 110)

== Other streets ==
- Arrow Highway
- Christmas Tree Lane
- Colorado Boulevard
- Fair Oaks Avenue
- Foothill Boulevard
- Lake Avenue
- Mission Road (and Mission Drive)
- Orange Grove Boulevard

== Public transit ==
- Foothill Transit
- Montebello Bus Lines
- Los Angeles County Metropolitan Transportation Authority

== See also ==
- El Camino Real (California)
- Mount Wilson Toll Road
- Transportation in Los Angeles
