= Eaton Canyon =

Natural feature in the U.S. state of California

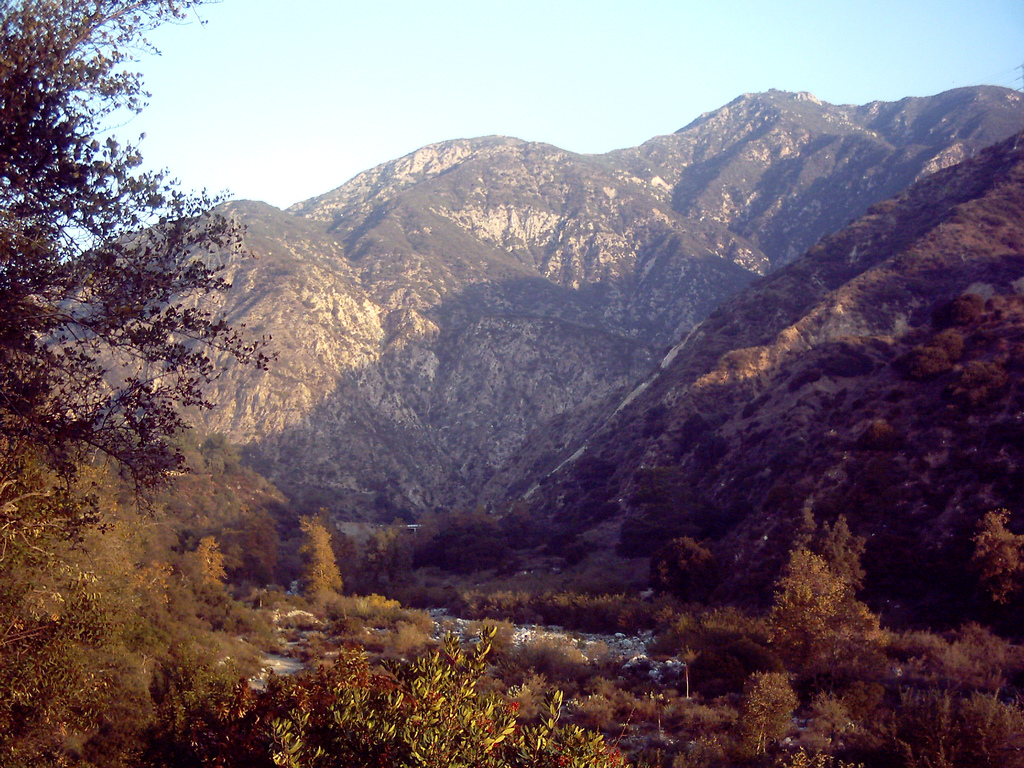
- Eaton Canyon with toll road bridge in background
- Interactive map of Eaton Canyon
- Nearest city: Pasadena, California
- Coordinates: 34°12′18″N 118°05′17″W

Eaton Canyon is a major canyon beginning at the Eaton Saddle near Mount Markham and San Gabriel Peak in the San Gabriel Mountains in the Angeles National Forest, United States. Its drainage flows into the Rio Hondo river and then into the Los Angeles River. It is named after Judge Benjamin S. Eaton, who lived in the Fair Oaks Ranch House in 1865 not far from Eaton Creek.

The most well-known portion of the canyon is the Eaton Canyon Nature Center in Pasadena, California. The trailhead of the Mount Wilson Toll Road is in the canyon.

== History ==
The canyon has been part of the homelands of the Tongva for thousands of years. The village of Puntitavjatngna relied on the freshwater of the canyon to thrive, housing about 500 to 1,500 dwellings. The Gabrielino (Tongva) peoples utilized the water for food production and special ceremonies. Acorns, a staple food for the Gabrielino, were soaked in the water and then turned into a mush-like substance to eat. The water sources of the canyon were essential to the survival of both the Topisibit and Puntitavjatngna settlements, which were villages within the Gabrielino tribe.

Spanish settlers arrived in the area in the late eighteenth century between 1769 and 1840, carrying weapons and diseases and referred to the canyon as "El Precipicio" because of its steep gorges. The canyon falls under several governmental jurisdictions. The canyon would soon be considered prime ranch land for cattle and other livestock because of the abundant water source. Spanish settlers viewed the Gabrielino and other indigenous settlements’ ties to and reliance on the water in the canyon as a hindrance to their own crusades, and the Spanish subsequently forcibly removed them from Eaton Canyon to the Mission San Gabriel Arcángel in modern day San Gabriel. Soon after the Spanish removed the indigenous population from the canyon, the rancho era began, with royal favors declaring land as ranchos for Spanish families.

Benjamin Eaton was hired by Don Benito Wilson to bring water to the Fair Oaks Ranch, the first Fair Oaks Ranch House on the property, in 1865, with the canyon later named after him. Eaton was the first to plant grapes in the canyon using irrigation practices, with water supporting the new produce growth in the canyon.

In 1877, the Precipice Canyon Water Company, the historic water enterprise in Altadena, began mining for water in Eaton Canyon. Eaton Canyon was the biggest water producer for many of the surrounding water companies. Dr. Hiram Reid, a writer focused on the surrounding area of Pasadena, wrote in his book “History of Pasadena” that there were about 50 tunnels supplying water to the city of Pasadena from the canyon. In the early 1880s, with the rise of agricultural expansion and the dry Mediterranean climate in the summers, annual rainfall wasn’t enough to support the ranches and acres of produce in the surrounding areas. Local springs and groundwater in the canyon were drained to provide water to the ranches and farmland. Today, the water is Eaton Canyon’s most fundamental resource to the surrounding communities, with both Pasadena and Altadena obtaining about 40% of their water from the San Gabriel Mountains, including Eaton Canyon.

Simultaneously, in August 1877, naturalist John Muir set out from Pasadena for an expedition into the San Gabriels, which he describes in his book “The Mountains of California.” He writes: "On the first day of my excursion I went only as far as the mouth of Eaton Canyon, because the heat was oppressive, and a pair of new shoes were chafing my feet to such an extent that walking began to be painful."

In October 1993, the Kinneloa Fire, begun accidentally on the slopes above Eaton Canyon, burned much of the area as well as more than a hundred homes in neighboring Altadena and Kinneloa Mesa as part of a rash of late October wildfires driven by Santa Ana winds in Southern California. One man died of complications from smoke inhalation and dozens were injured. After briefly serving as the incident command post for the fire, the Eaton Canyon Nature Center was destroyed. It was rebuilt in 1998.

In 2022, a 1 acre (0.40 ha) property overlooking the canyon was returned to the Tongva tribe via the Tongva Taraxat Paxaavxa Conservancy, which marked the first time the tribe had land in Los Angeles County in nearly 200 years. The returned land included fifty live oak trees, called wet in the Tongva language, which are native to California and produce acorns that are a staple in the Tongva people's diet and culture. The returned land would be named Huhuungna, or the Place of the Bears, in the Tongva language.When the Eaton Fire occurred, the land was damaged, with the garage and old stone cottage that were at the edge of the canyon burning completely. Two of the fifty oak trees closest to the burned structures were also badly burned and marred; the rest survived with minimal scarring damage. The main structure on the land didn’t face extensive damage because the fire didn’t cross the property line.

Aerial image of burned areas in Altadena after the 2025 Eaton Fire created by NASA’s AVIRIS-3 (Airborne Visible/Infrared Imaging Spectrometer-3)

In 2025, the Eaton Fire consumed the Eaton Canyon Nature Center and burned much of the canyon.

== Geology ==
The San Gabriel Mountains are relatively young and have been shaped by faulting and earthquakes. Some rocks in Eaton Canyon can be dated back to over two billion years ago. Eaton Canyon is composed of two types of rocks: metamorphic and igneous rocks. For more specificity, the metamorphic rocks are Muscovite Mica Schist, Biotite Mica Schist, and Gneiss. The igneous rocks are Wilson Quartz Diorite, Lowe Granodiorite, Hornblende Gabbro, Granite Pegmatite, and Milky Quartz. Due to earthquake movement, the San Gabriel Mountains are made of eroding, shattered rock. When it rains, sand and other rocks get swept up and transported into basins by the water; the byproduct is called alluvium. The main area of the canyon consists of metamorphic Gneiss rock with layers about 2 centimeters thick, dating to the Proterozoic era. The base, where the water deposits sand and rock, contains very old alluvial-fan deposits, dating to the middle to early Pleistocene era.

== Landmarks ==
=== Eaton Canyon Natural Area Park ===
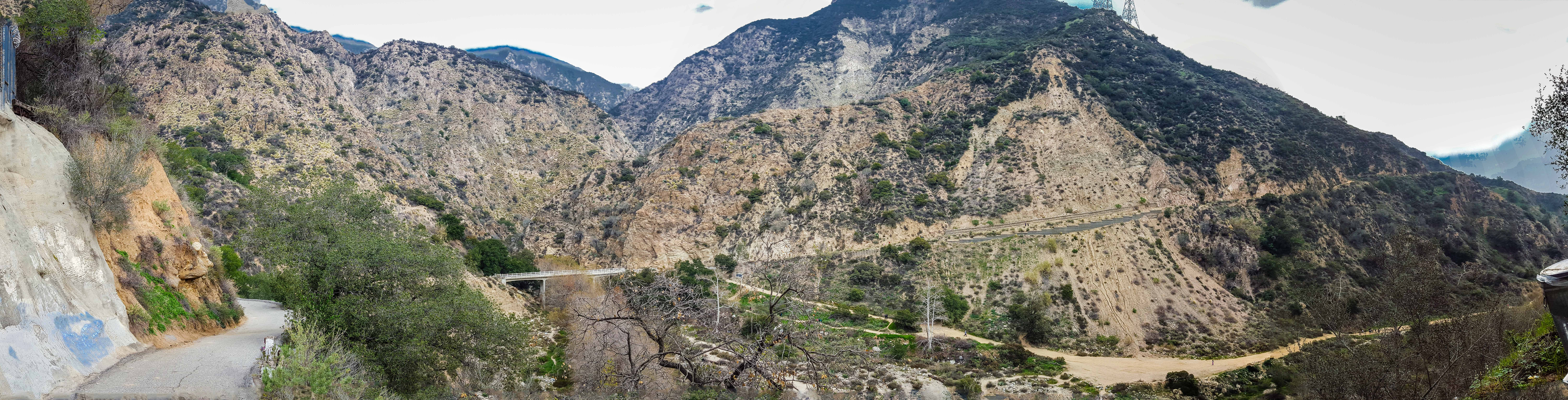
Eaton Canyon, view to the east from Pinecrest Drive

The Eaton Canyon Natural Area Park is located where the mountain stream debouches into the foothill wash at the base of the San Gabriel Mountains. The park is administered by the Los Angeles County Department of Parks and Recreation. The county administers the lower two-thirds of the area below the toll road bridge. Most of the 190 acres (0.8 km^{2}) that comprises the natural area lie on the northern boundaries of the old Rancho San Pascual and Rancho Santa Anita on land designated for the Southern Pacific Railroad. Once the railroad gave up the land, it was opened for homesteading.

Sign of the Eaton Canyon Natural Park and Nature Center at entrance of canyon in 2024

Within the park sits the Eaton Canyon Nature Center, a 7,600-square-foot facility that features information displays, exhibits, and collections about the local flora and fauna in the valley. The center was rebuilt in 1998 after the 1993 fire destroyed the previous facility. The center was burned down again during the Eaton Fire in January 2025. The staff was unable to evacuate the reptiles in their care and lost several valuable items.

Pasadena and parts of Altadena receive about 40% of their water from local sources. The upper third is controlled by the Water Department of the City of Pasadena.

- 34.177233°N 118.097°W - Eaton Canyon Park

=== Eaton Canyon Falls ===
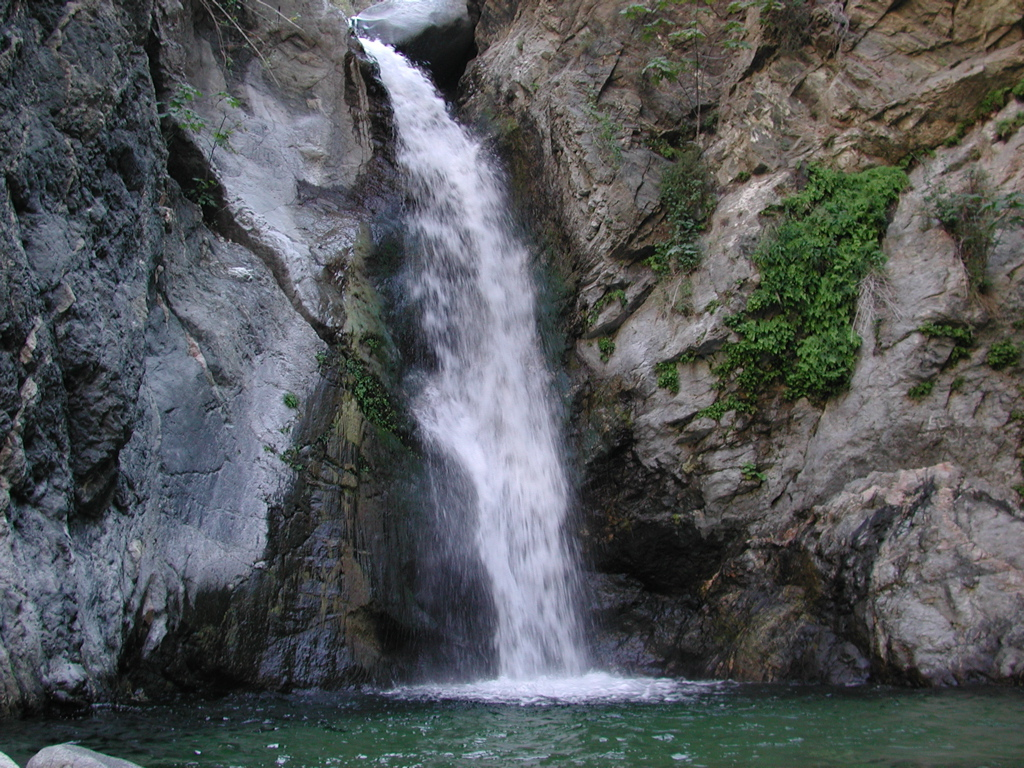
Eaton Canyon Falls

The falls are where the Eaton Creek has a fifty-foot drop and are located north of the bridge in the part of the canyon administered by the US Forest Service. John Muir once described the waterfall as "a charming little thing, with a low, sweet voice, singing like a bird, as it pours from a notch in a short ledge, some thirty or forty feet into a round mirror-pool."

Several waterfalls also exist above Eaton Fall, which are more secluded. Until 1979, there was a tunnel which allowed access, but this has been dynamited and filled in. While the upper falls were accessible decades ago, there are no longer any maintained trails. People have been injured and killed trying to make these climbs via unofficial trails.

In 2011, a man fell to his death on the hike to the falls. Another man fell to his death one week later. In 2013, two hikers attempted to climb to the second waterfall, but decided against it mid-climb. As they were coming down, they both lost their footing and fell. One hiker fell to her death, and the other was airlifted to a hospital.

On June 27, 2014, the US Forest Service announced plans to close the trail to the upper falls. The trail to the upper falls was closed off on August 1, 2014. Violators caught trespassing the off-limits area will face a fine of up to $5,000 or six months in jail. Members of the Coalition of American Canyoneers would like access to the area that is closed.

- 34.1966°N 118.1028°W - Eaton Canyon falls

=== Golf course ===
The Eaton Canyon Golf Course is a regulation 9-hole course featuring narrow fairways and rolling terrain. It is administered by the Los Angeles County Department of Parks and Recreation and has been open since 1962.

It was originally planned as an eighteen-hole facility and was designed by famed golf course architect, William Francis Bell (known as Billy Bell Jr., son of famed golf course designer, William Park Bell). Opening day ceremonies included a golf outing with dignitaries and local golf professionals, including 1961 PGA Champion, Jerry Barber.

- 34.1658°N 118.1044°W - Eaton Canyon Park Golf Course

=== Mount Wilson Toll Road ===
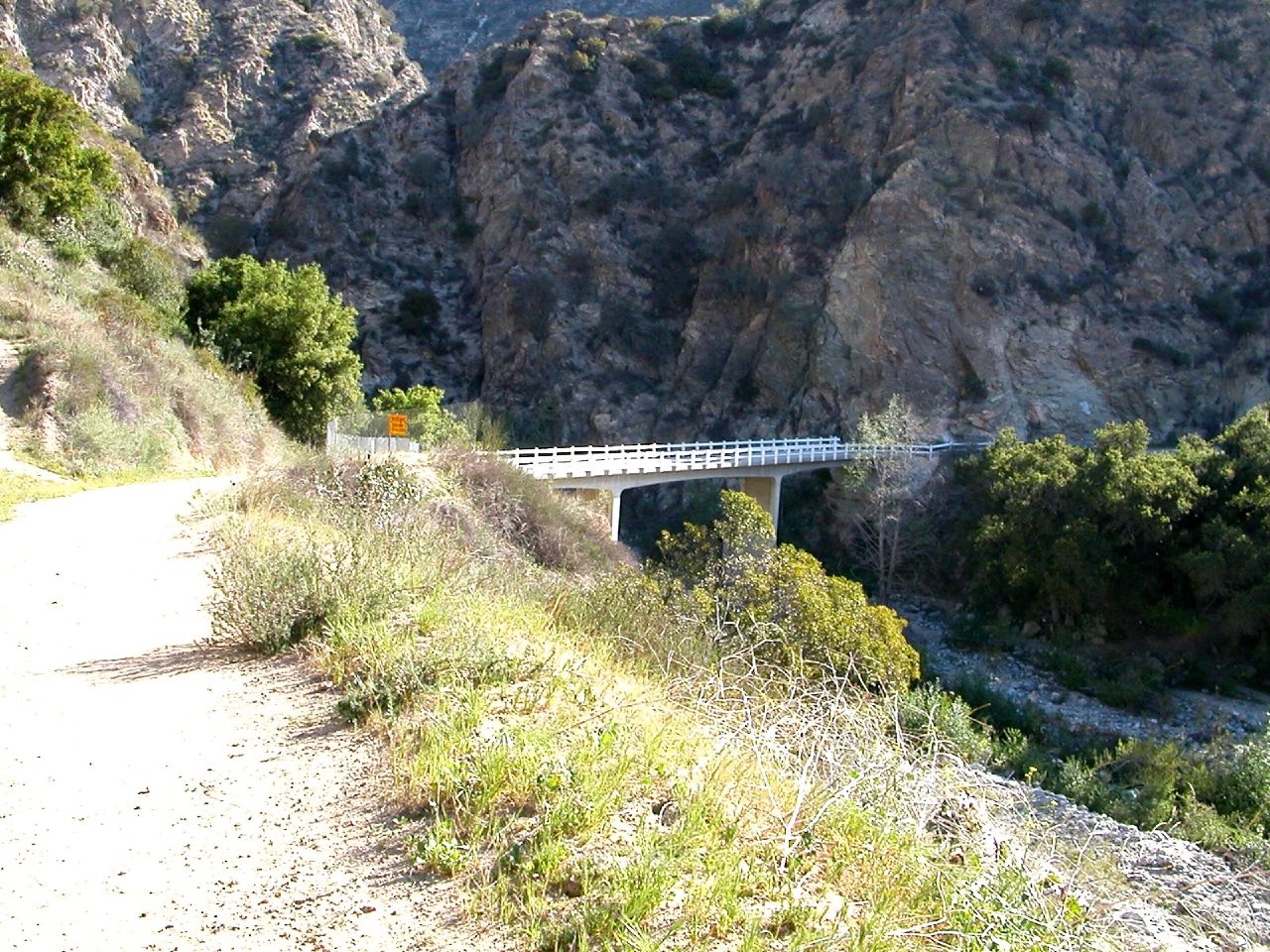
Mt. Wilson Toll Road trail head

The Mount Wilson Toll Road (1891–1936) is a historic roadway which ascended Mount Wilson via a vehicular passable road from the base of the foothills in Altadena. It was accessible from Pasadena via Santa Anita Avenue which drove right to the front porch of the toll house. The road is still accessible from Pinecrest Drive, just off Altadena Drive in Altadena. Access was blocked after a 2005 landslide destroyed 50 yards of the road, but the road has since been rebuilt and reopened.

Mount Wilson had always been active with human passage starting from the days of the local Indians. It was Benjamin Davis Wilson who established a proper trail to the summit of Mt. Wilson from Sierra Madre through the Santa Anita Canyon. The Mt. Wilson Toll Road to Henninger Flats is controlled by the Forester and Fire Warden of the Los Angeles County Fire Department.

- 34.19189°N 118.1044°W - Mt. Wilson Toll Road trail head

=== Eaton Wash ===
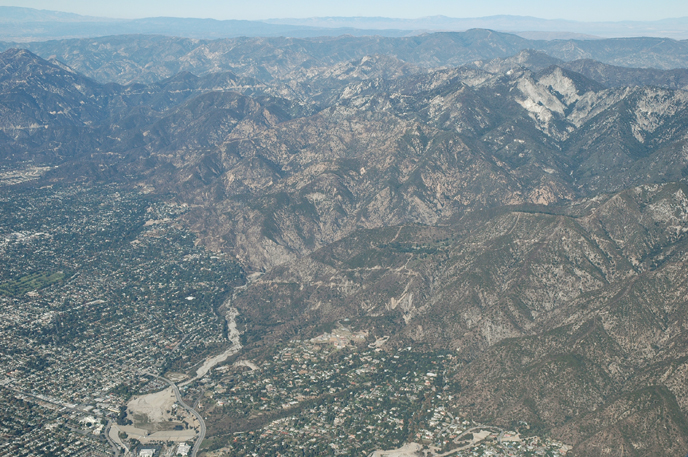
Eaton Canyon, reservoir and wash from the air

Emerging from the foothills and flowing south, the Eaton Creek becomes the Eaton Wash, whose drainage flows into the Rio Hondo river and then into the Los Angeles River. The wash is one of the Altadena streams that helps to feed to Raymond Basin. Rubio, Las Flores and others all flow to the east eventually to join the Rio Hondo. Millard Canyon on the west flows to the Arroyo Seco. Eaton Wash is one of the two major streams that channels storm water in Pasadena; the other is the Arroyo Seco on the western side of the city.

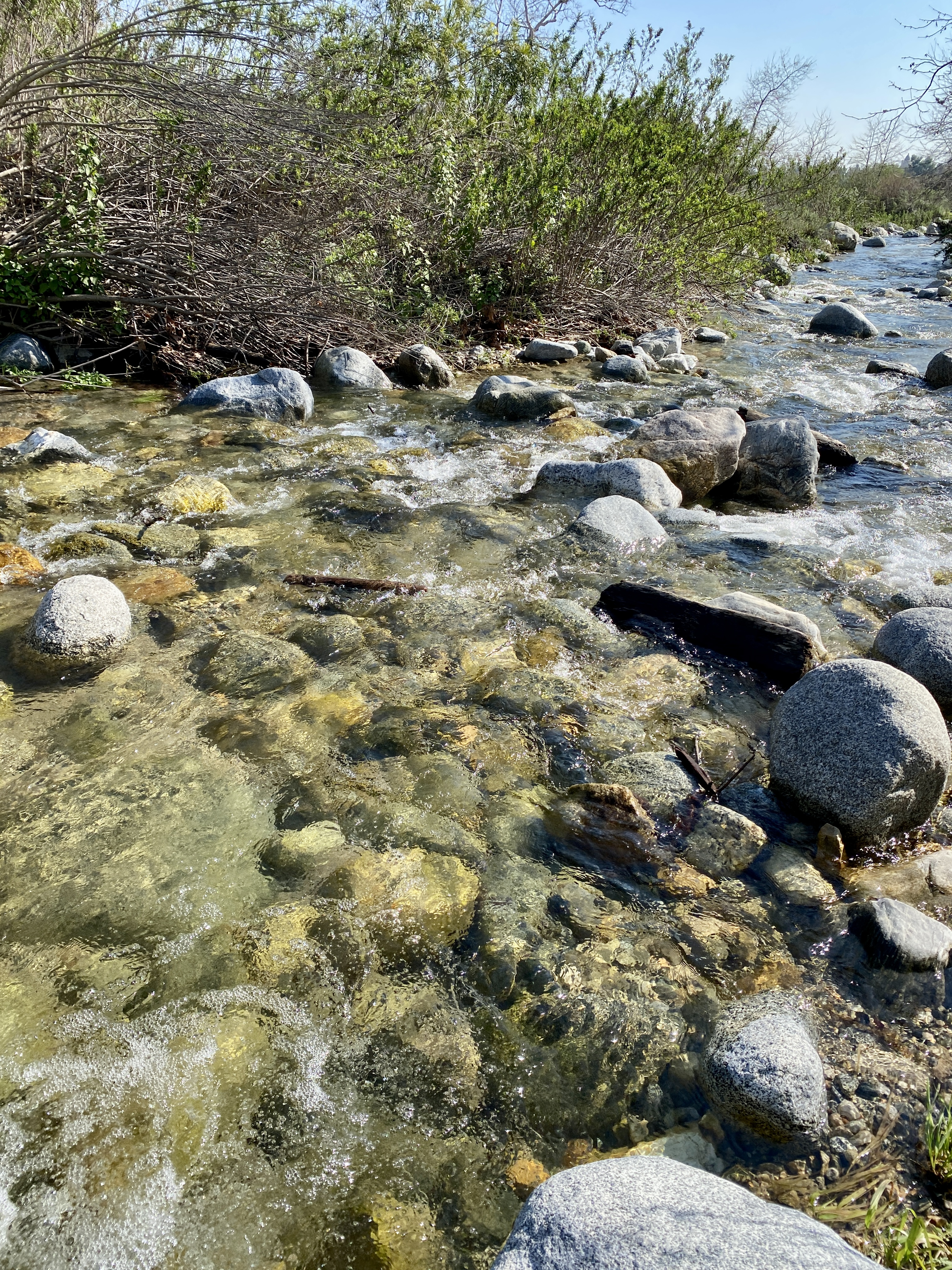
Eaton Creek (2024)

On its way to the Rio Hondo, the Eaton Wash is joined by the combined drainages from Pasadena Glen and Hastings Canyons. These channels have all been modified by flood control dams near the base of the mountains, and both have been confined to manmade channels or storm drains in their lower reaches. Typically the Eaton Wash and Arroyo Seco carry very little water. Peak discharges are typically less than 1,000 ft^{3}/s (30 m^{3}/s) for Arroyo Seco and less than 500 ft^{3}/s (15 m^{3}/s) for Eaton Wash.

- 34.0694°N 118.056°W - Eaton Wash, USGS El Monte (CA)

=== Eaton Canyon Reservoir and Dam ===
Eaton Wash Reservoir and the Eaton Wash Dam were built in 1937 (89 years ago) and are controlled by the Los Angeles County Department of Public Works. The dam is a rock fill, 63 feet (19 m) in height, and is 1,545 ft (471 m) in length. Normal storage for the reservoir is 721 acre-feet (889,000 m^{3}). It has a surface area of 54 acres (22 ha) and drains an area of 9.47 square miles (24.5 km^{2}). Its primary usage is for flood control and debris storage.

- 34.17°N 118.09134°W - Eaton Canyon Reservoir
- 34.1692°N 118.09°W - Eaton Wash Dam

== See also ==
- Angeles National Forest Fire Lookout Association
- California chaparral and woodlands
