= Fair Oaks Avenue =

Road in Pasadena, California, United States

- Namesake: Fair Oaks Ranch
- Length: 7.9 mi (12.7 km)
- Location: Los Angeles County, California, U.S.
- North end: Huntington Drive in South Pasadena
- Major junctions: SR 110 in South Pasadena; I-210 / SR 134 in Pasadena
- South end: North of Loma Alta Avenue in Altadena

Construction
- Construction start: c. 1870s

Fair Oaks Avenue in Pasadena, California, is a major north–south road connecting the communities of Altadena, Pasadena, and South Pasadena, running 7.9 miles (12.7 km) in length. It starts at its southernmost end in South Pasadena at Huntington Drive. It travels due north to a terminus above Loma Alta Avenue in Altadena and the gates of Angelus County Park. Beyond this, the road becomes a private easement.

At its meeting of Colorado Boulevard in Pasadena the two roads become the zero-zero, east–west, north–south postal division of Pasadena which carries on into Altadena. In South Pasadena, the street numbering varies with its own postal zip code.

== History ==
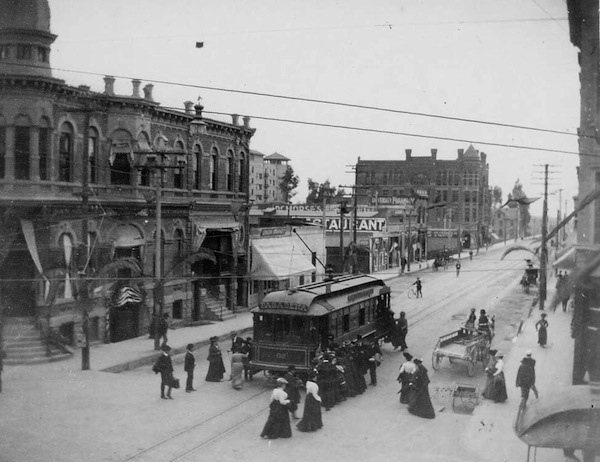
Fair Oaks Avenue looking south from Colorado Boulevard, c. 1903

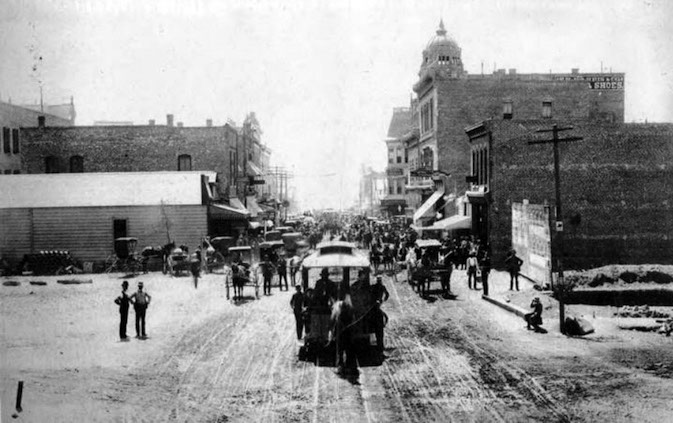
1889 Fair Oaks Avenue looking south from Colorado Street (now Colorado Boulevard).

Fair Oaks is one of the major roads developed by the Indiana Colony dating back to 1874. It was apparently named for one of Pasadena's earlier ranches, the Fair Oaks Ranch, named by the widow of General Albert Sidney Johnston for her Virginia home. The road led up from Raymond Hill and north to Washington Boulevard where it met the Painter Hotel. There being little reason to travel more northward, the road dwindled to a watery footpath and meandered through about three miles (5 km) of scrub growth until a similar road picked up in the Altadena Community. At that time, the road was the divider between the Indiana Colony and Benjamin D. Wilson's Lake Vineyard settlement. As the original Indiana Colony and the Vineyard colony became friendly economic rivals on each side of the avenue, it became known as the Mason and Dixon line.

The intersection of Fair Oaks Avenue and Colorado Boulevard became known as "The Corners." The avenue, along with Colorado Boulevard became the main streets in the early development of Pasadena with Fair Oaks Avenue being the main route between Los Angeles and Pasadena.

In 1895, the Pasadena and Los Angeles Railway built what became the Pacific Electric Railway's South Pasadena Local Red Car line on the entire length of Fair Oaks Avenue to Pasadena from its 6th & Main terminal in Downtown Los Angeles. Also serving the avenue was the North Fair Oaks Avenue Line and the Mount Lowe Railway. The lines were mostly abandoned in the 1920s.

At a point of today's 210 Freeway, there was a fork in the road that veered obliquely to the northwest. This was an access to the greatest local water source in Millard Canyon, and was named New Fair Oaks Road. Eventually this road was renamed Lincoln Avenue and Old Fair Oaks Road just became Fair Oaks Avenue.

Long considered the center of town, the corner of Colorado and Fair Oaks lost its centrality by the ever eastwardly expansion of the city. But now it has regained its central position as one of the most attractive corners in the upscaled Old Town Pasadena sector.

== Landmarks and transportation ==
Amongst many landmarks on Fair Oaks Avenue is the Fair Oaks Pharmacy which opened in 1915 and the historic modernist 1414 Fair Oaks Building which is listed by the Los Angeles Conservancy.

Also on the avenue is the Los Angeles College of Music, the Huntington Hospital in Pasadena and the Mountain View Cemetery in Altadena.

Fair Oaks Avenue is served mainly by Metro Local line 260 south of Walnut Street, Line 660 between Del Mar Boulevard and Loma Alta Drive, Pasadena Transit Line 20 between Woodbury Road and Glenarm Street (except between Orange Grove and Del Mar boulevards) and Line 51/52 between Mountain and Walnut streets.

== See also ==
- List of streets in the San Gabriel Valley
