= Vetter Mountain =

Mountain in California, United States

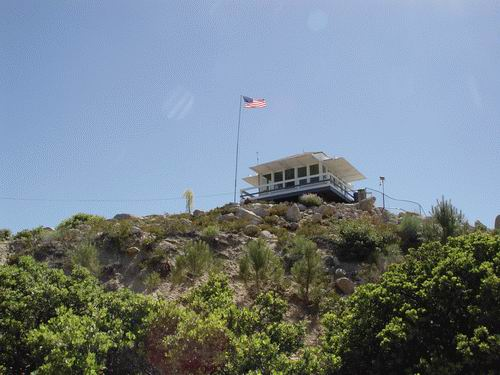
- Vetter Mountain fire lookout tower

Highest point
- Elevation: 5,911 ft (1,802 m) NAVD 88
- Prominence: 708 ft (216 m)
- Listing: Hundred Peaks Section; California Fire Lookouts
- Coordinates: 34°17′49″N 118°01′43″W

Geography
- Location within California
- Location: Angeles National Forest; Los Angeles County, California, U.S.
- Parent range: San Gabriel Mountains
- Topo map: USGS Chilao Flat

Climbing
- Easiest route: Forest road 3Na6

Vetter Mountain is located in the San Gabriel Mountains and within the Angeles National Forest, Los Angeles County, California, United States. Elevation 5,911 feet (1,802 m) feet.

Named by USFS surveyor Don McLain (c. 1933) for Victor P. Vetter (nd.), a dedicated forest ranger and fire dispatcher. Vetter won the USFS Bissell Medal for outstanding work in forest conservation (1930).

The Silver Moccasin Trail crosses the mountain on its eastern slopes.

== Fire lookout ==
Vetter Mountain is the site of historic Vetter Mountain fire lookout tower, a ground mounted BC-3 type cab.

The lookout tower was built in 1937 and remained in service until 1981. Ramona Merwin, a USFS fire lookout staffed the tower from 1953 until its closing. The tower was slated to be moved to the Chilao Visitors Center, but a group of active citizens in cooperation with the Forest Service were able to rebuild, restore, and return the tower to operational service in 1998. The tower was operated by the Angeles National Forest Fire Lookout Association (ANFFLA) citizen volunteers in cooperation with the USDA Forest Service until it was destroyed on August 31, 2009, by the Station Fire. In the years since the fire, the volunteers have been manning a temporary lookout at the base of the steps to the original lookout, keeping watch over the forest. The Angeles National Forest Fire Lookout Association (ANFFLA) volunteers began the rebuilding of the fire lookout on July 12, 2014, with a "bucket brigade," pouring a new concrete pad on which to build a new lookout structure, using the original 1930s historic design. Construction was completed in 2020.

The lookout overlooks several segments of the Angeles Crest Highway, and has a clear view of Mount Wilson to the south, and Mount Pacifico to the north.

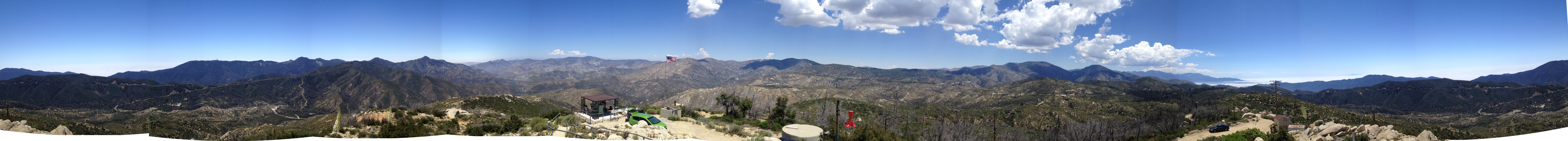
410 degree panorama from the Vetter Mountain fire lookout tower site, centered on North.

== Charlton Flats ==
Charlton Flats is a picnic grounds located to northeast face of Vetter Mountain, about 40 minutes drive from the Interstate 210. The picnic area has about 185 tables and stoves and is open April 1 through November 15.

The original name of the area was Pine Flat when it was renamed to Charlton Flats in honor of the "new" forest service's first forest supervisor, Mr. R.H. Charlton. Mr. Charlton served as the Angeles National Forest supervisor from 1905 to 1925 (20 years).

Northern Slope Vetter Mountain is between the "Chaparral" zone to the south, and the "Montane Forest" to the north. The "Chaparral" zone is found on the hot, dry, south facing slopes of the foothills of the San Gabriel Mountains. Plants are chest height, dense, prickly, and evergreen; typically contains chamise, yucca, Ceanothus, scrub oak, laurel sumac, white sage black sage, poison oak, and in the higher elevations, manzanita and mountain mahogany.	The northern face of Vetter Mountain as viewed from Angeles Crest Highway from the Chilao area. The Vetter Mountain fire lookout tower is at the summit.
Southern Slope Vetter Mountain is between the "Chaparral" zone to the south, and the "Montane Forest" to the north. The Montaine zone contains bigcone spruce, canyon oak, Jeffrey pine, sugar pine, incense cedar and white fir.	The southern face of Vetter Mountain. The Vetter Mountain fire lookout tower is at the summit.
