= Puntitavjatngna =

Tongva village

Puntitavjatngna was a Tongva village located in what is now northeast Pasadena.

== Background ==
It was interconnected with the closely situated village of Topisibit, both of which relied on access to the waters of what became later known as Eaton Canyon. The village may have had around 500 to 1,500 dwellings. The village declined following the arrival of Spanish colonizers, who forcibly brought the villagers to Mission San Gabriel Arcángel shortly after they established a presence in the region.

The village name is the origin for the name of the city of Pasadena.
