= Castro Peak (California) =

Mountain in California, United States

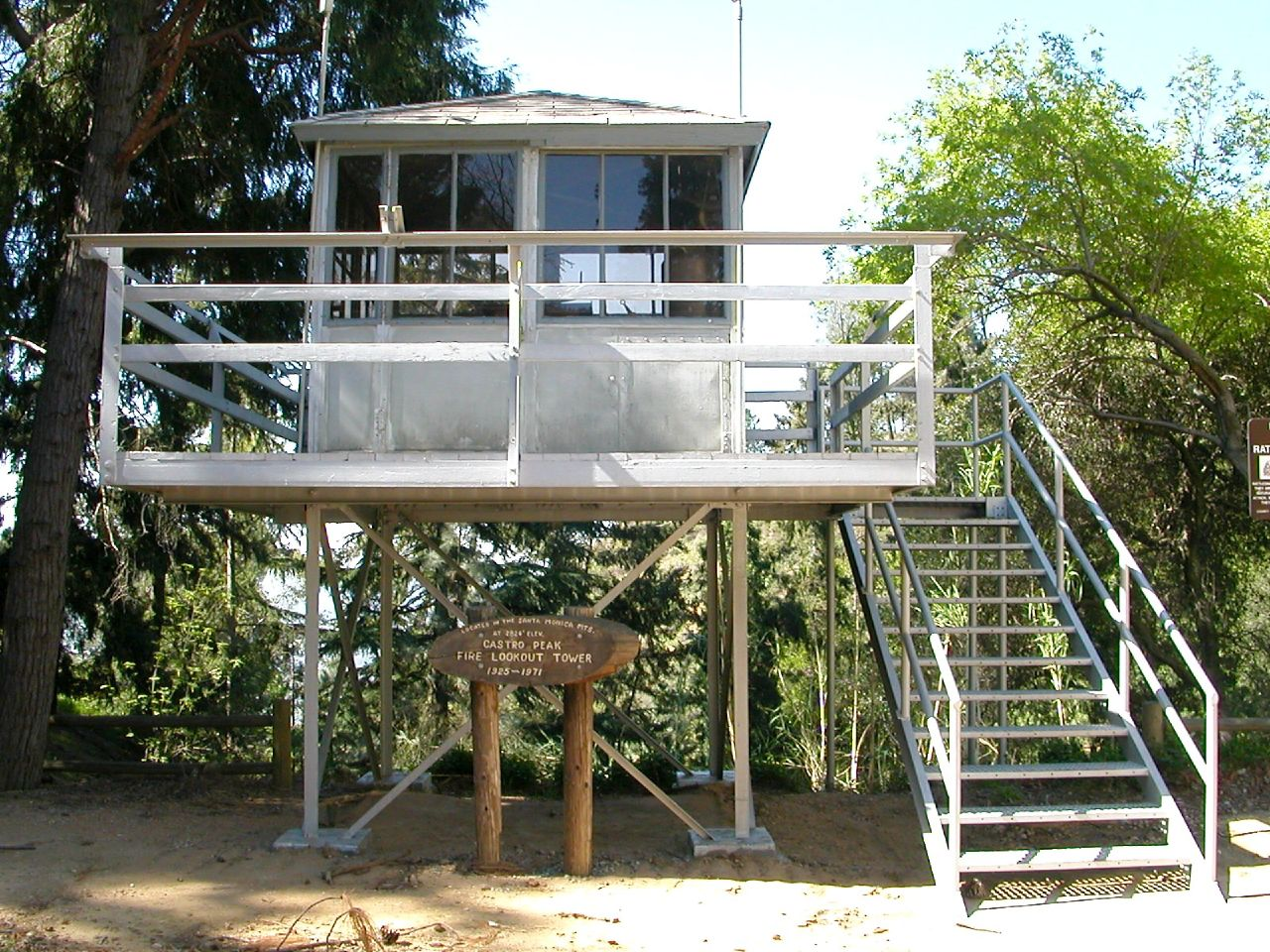
- The fire lookout tower once on Castro Peak

Highest point
- Elevation: 2,826 ft (861 m) NAVD 88
- Prominence: 1,037 ft (316 m)
- Coordinates: 34°05′09″N 118°47′09″W

Geography
- Location within California
- Location: Los Angeles County, California, U.S.
- Parent range: Santa Monica Mountains
- Topo map: USGS Point Dume

Castro Peak, at 2,826 feet (861 m), is the highest peak in the middle part of the Santa Monica Mountains and is in the Santa Monica Mountains National Recreation Area. The town of Malibu is located to the southeast of the peak.

The fire lookout tower that was once located on Castro Peak has been moved to Henninger Flats in the San Gabriel Mountains for display.

== See also ==
- Santa Monica Mountains topics index
- Angeles National Forest Fire Lookout Association
