= Mission Road =

United States street in Los Angeles

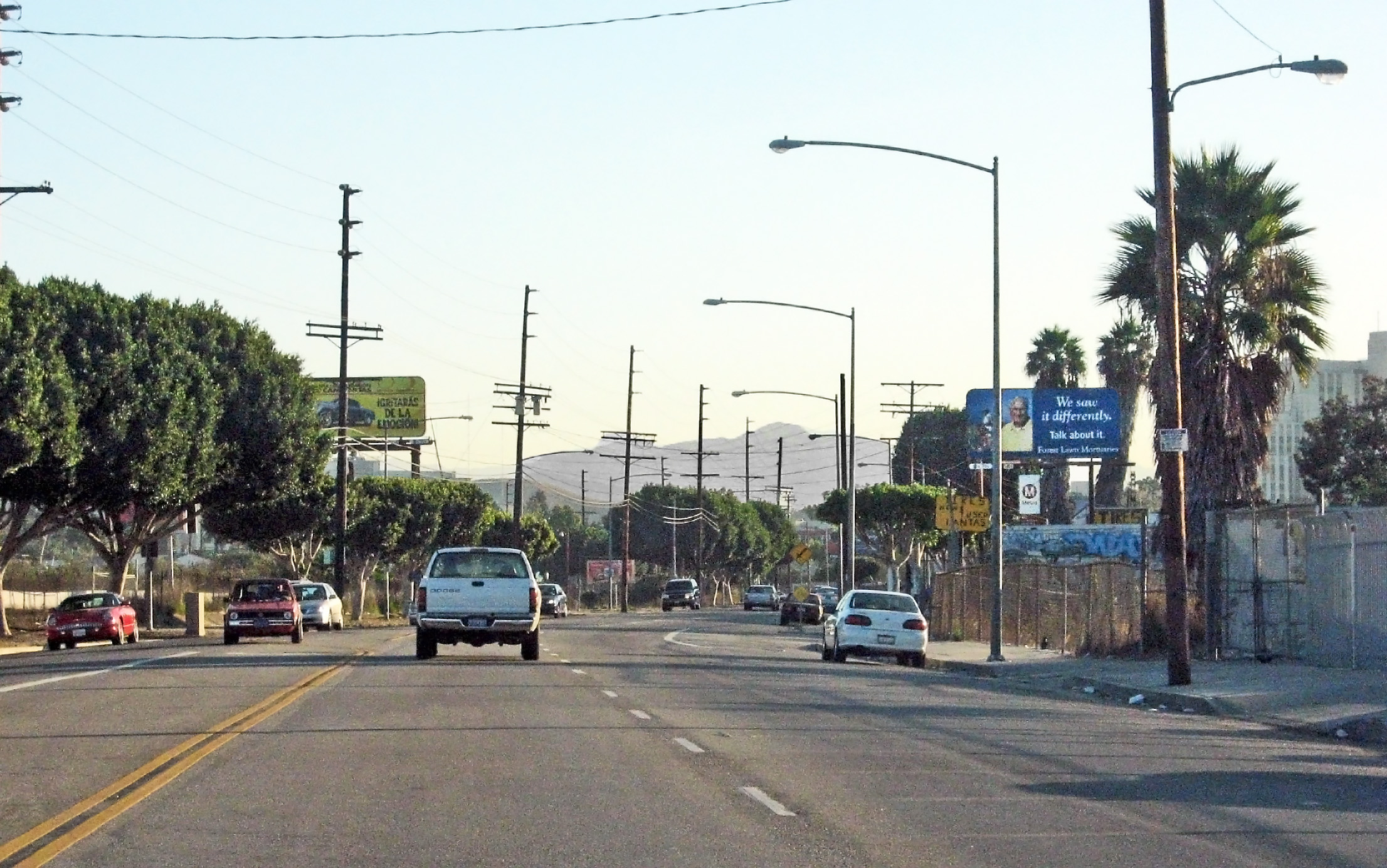
- Interactive map of Mission Road
- Length: 4 miles (6.4 km)
- Location: Downtown Los Angeles; San Gabriel Valley
- South end: Jesse Street near Downtown Los Angeles
- North end: Valley Boulevard in Rosemead

Mission Road is a major north-east south-west arterial street in the city of Los Angeles. It serves primarily as an alternative route to get to and from the Downtown Los Angeles area and the San Gabriel Valley. Part of the road is considered a portion of El Camino Real.

== Route Description ==
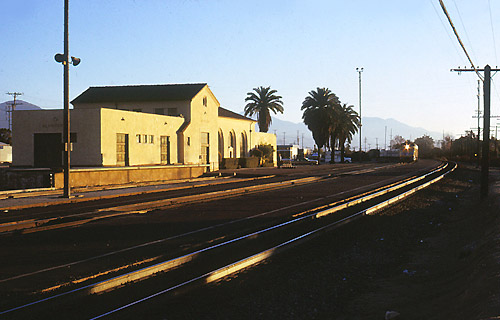
Alhambra station along Mission Road in Alhambra in 1973

South Mission Road begins as a very narrow street adjacent to the Los Angeles River, near the bridge of 7th Street over the river in the Boyle Heights neighborhood of Los Angeles. From then on, it goes northbound, crossing 4th Street and 1st Street. At the intersection of 1st Street, the Metro L Line passes on 1st Street, with a station nearby. In less than two blocks, the Hollywood Freeway (US 101) passes above the street with on and off ramps. Shortly after, it intersects with Cesar Chavez Avenue.

After crossing the intersection, it is labelled as North Mission Road, and follows a straight path towards the Golden State Freeway. At the intersections of Daly Street /Marengo Street, Mission Road divides the boundary limits of Lincoln Heights and Boyle Heights neighborhoods respectively.

Mission Road is also the northern terminus for two of the city's major streets. Upon crossing a bridge, Valley Boulevard is the first intersection, then comes Main Street. The road will then pass Lincoln Park before reaching Broadway. A few blocks ahead marks the end of North Mission Road.

While the Los Angeles portion ends at Huntington Drive and Soto Street, there is a gap in the route. Another portion resumes in Alhambra, at the Los Angeles-Alhambra line and continues into San Gabriel and Rosemead where it becomes Mission Drive and ends at Valley Boulevard.

== History ==
In 2004, a portion of the northern terminus in El Sereno known as the Soto Street Bridge, where Soto Street becomes Huntington Drive North, was declared functionally obsolete and scheduled for replacement. The bridge was constructed in 1936 as joint venture between the state, city and Pacific Electric Railway as an overpass of its Red Car system.

Since 2015, Caltrans has been working on major upgrades for this intersection. Once finished, Mission Road Huntington Drive, & Soto Street will all meet in a "T" intersection. This will enhance local residents because there will be more sidewalks to walk on and reduce traffic gradually.

== Transportation ==
- Metro Local lines 78, and 79 provides service via Mission Road/Huntington Drive to Arcadia.
