= Crank House =

Historic house in California, United States

- Fair Oaks Ranch House
- U.S. National Register of Historic Places
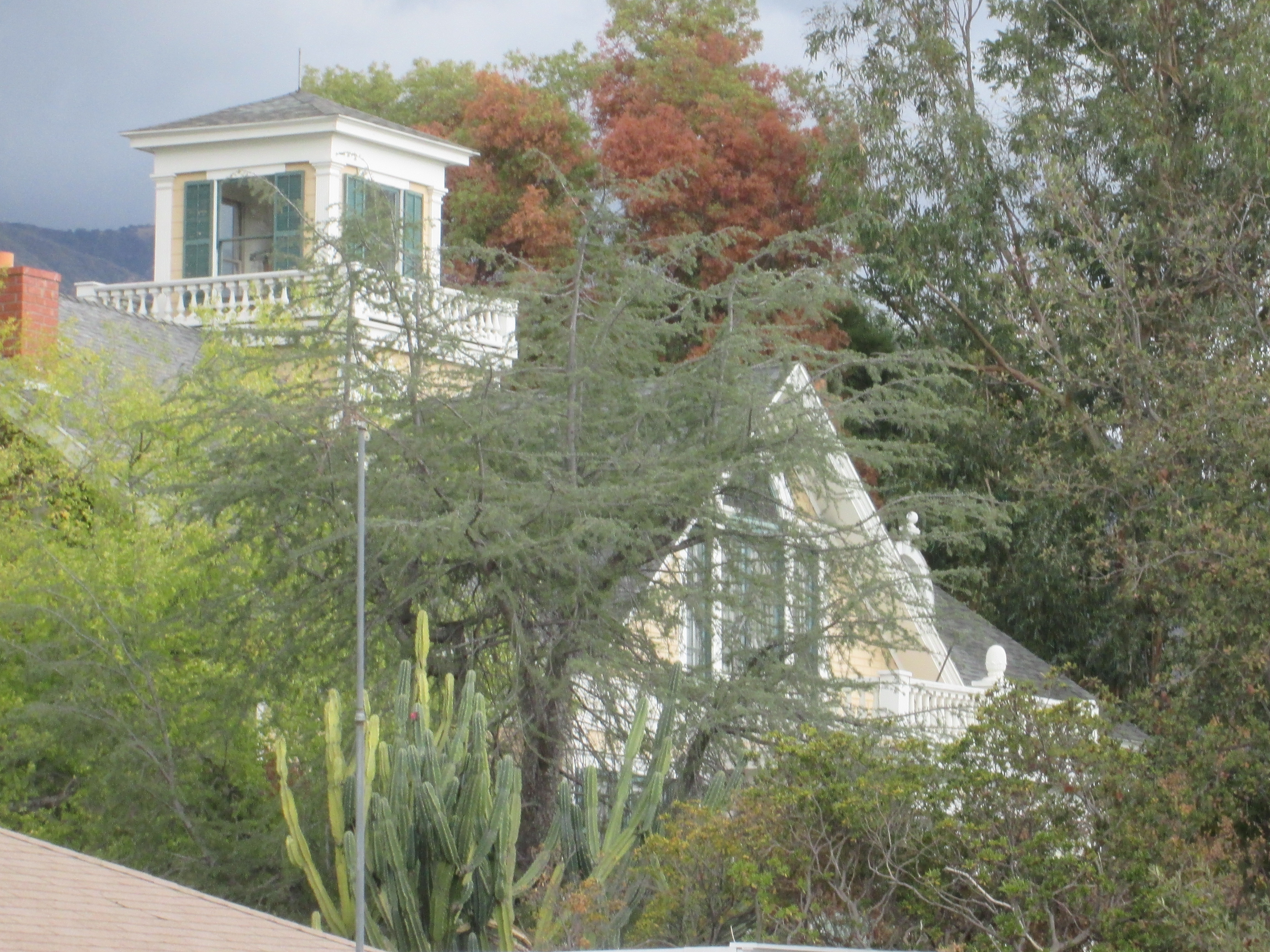

- Location within the Los Angeles metropolitan area Location within California Location within the United States
- Location: 2186 Crary St. [ Pasadena, California] 91104 ]
- Coordinates: 34°10′21″N 118°06′20″W
- Built: 1883
- Architectural style: Victorian architecture
- NRHP reference No.: 97000751
- Added to NRHP: July 23, 1997

Crank House, also known as Fair Oaks Ranch, is an 1883 Victorian style residence in Pasadena, Los Angeles County, California. The house was placed on the National Register of Historic Places in 1997 for its association with the early settlement of Pasadena. (site #97000751). The house has notably featured in films such as Hocus Pocus (Allison's house interior shots), Matilda (Trunchbull's house), Scream 2 (Omega Beta Zeta sorority house) and Catch Me If You Can (Roger Strong's house).

== History ==
=== Eliza Griffin Johnston ===
The Crank House sits on land, the Fair Oaks Ranch, once owned by Eliza Griffin Johnston, the widow of Confederate General Albert Sidney Johnston. Following the death of her husband at the Battle of Shiloh in April 1862, Eliza and her children came to Southern California at the urging of her brother, John S. Griffin. Griffin had large land holdings in the Los Angeles area and was a business partner of Benjamin Davis Wilson in Rancho San Pascual. Wilson was a local land speculator, politician, and also the maternal grandfather of General George S. Patton. Griffin sold Eliza Griffin Johnston the property for $1,000.

Eliza Griffin Johnston named her ranch "Fair Oaks", after her native city in Virginia and also for the stands of Coast live oaks—Quercus agrifloia in the area. When Eliza's son, Albert II, was killed in a steamship boiler explosion at Wilmington, Los Angeles in 1864, she left California and returned to Virginia.

The ranch was taken over by Benjamin Eaton, father of Frederick Eaton. Benjamin Eaton subdivided the ranch. The southern portion was bought by the Ellises.

=== James F. Crank ===
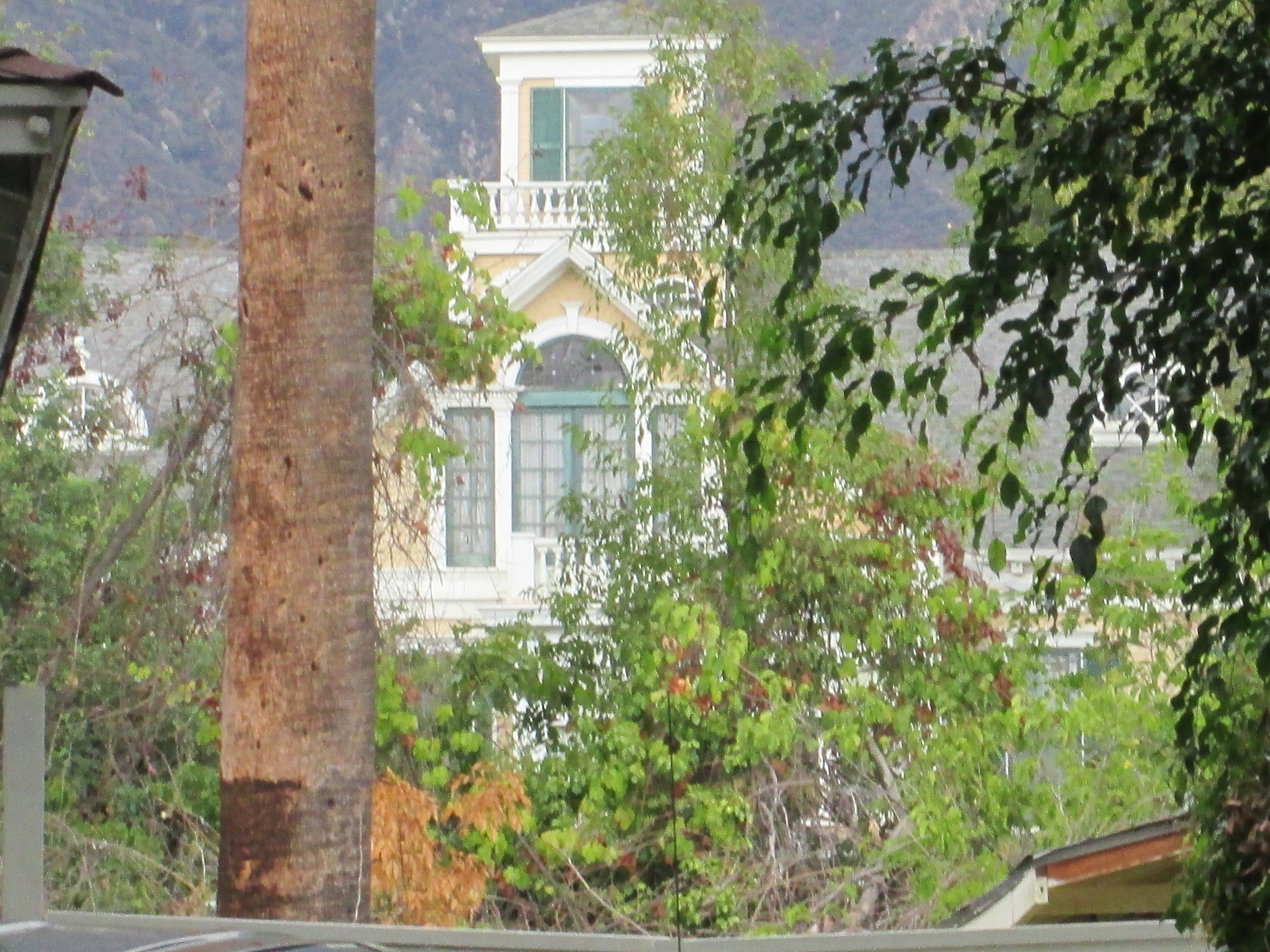
Another view of the house

The northern portion was bought by James F. Crank in 1877. Crank came from New York and was impressed with the land, and soon planted citrus orchards and vineyards. Eliza Johnston's simple wood-frame house was moved to another location on the property, and still stands at 2072 Oakwood Street, Altadena. Crank built a much larger, more palatial home in 1882. The house is a 2 1/2-story wood-frame Victorian mansion.

In 1883, Crank invested in the Los Angeles and San Gabriel Valley Railroad, becoming its president. The rail line ran from Pasadena to downtown Los Angeles. Los Angeles and San Gabriel Valley Railroad was sold and consolidated on May 20, 1887, into the California Central Railway. In 1889, this was consolidated into Southern California Railway Company. On January 17, 1906, Southern California Railway was sold to the Atchison, Topeka and Santa Fe Railway and called the Pasadena Subdivision. Even so, Crank suffered financially, and sold the ranch. It was subdivided in 1910. He donated land for the Raymond Hotel in Pasadena, that had his Pasadena rail station. When Mr. Crank and his family first came to California, they stayed at the Sierra Madre Villa Hotel.

Today, it is a private residence.
