= Mount Wilson Toll Road =

Historic road in the San Gabriel Mountains National Monument, USA

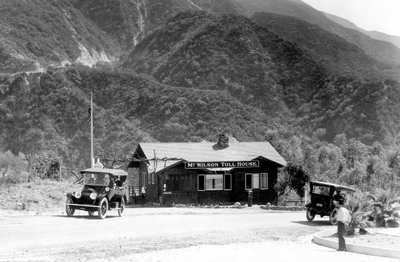
- The Mt Wilson Tollhouse seen along East Altadena Drive at Mendocino Lane
- Interactive map of Mount Wilson Toll Road
- Coordinates: 34°11′54″N 118°03′15″W
- Location: Angeles National Forest

The Mount Wilson Toll Road (1891–1936) is a historic roadway which ascended Mount Wilson via a vehicular passable road from the base of the foothills in Altadena. It was accessible from Pasadena via Santa Anita Avenue (nowadays the north–south portion of Altadena Drive) which drove right to the front porch of the toll house. The road is still accessible to non-motorized traffic (hikers, bicyclists, and horses) by way of Eaton Canyon (either from the Nature Center entrance, or an access gate on Pinecrest Drive, just off Altadena Drive in Altadena). Segments of it have been closed at various times due to landslides. A 2005 landslide destroyed 50 yards of the road, but it has since been rebuilt and reopened.

Mount Wilson had always been active with human passage starting from the days of the local Native Americans. It was Benjamin Davis Wilson who established a proper trail to the summit of Mt. Wilson from Sierra Madre through the Little Santa Anita Canyon.

== Inception of toll road ==
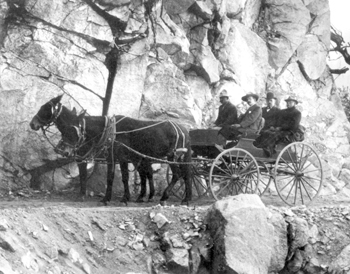
Horse and buggy passage on the Mount Wilson Trail.

The installation of the Harvard telescope in 1889 was fraught with difficulties, particularly during transport up the old Wilson trail. These difficulties spurred an interest in a more accessible Mount Wilson roadway. In June 1889, Judge Benjamin Eaton gathered a group of prominent Pasadena businessmen to consider building a wagon road to Mt. Wilson. Eighteen of the men agreed to contribute capital and, on July 12, 1889, they incorporated "The Pasadena and Mount Wilson Toll Road Company." However, the company failed before there was any progress on a roadway.

Within a few years, five of the original investors reorganized and refinanced the project, but since the Harvard telescope had been removed and interest in Mt. Wilson had diminished, they thought it better to downsize the project from a twelve-foot road to a four-foot road. By June 1891, after only five months work, a usable ten miles (16 km) trail was established. In July the new toll road was officially opened to the public and the toll fixed by the Los Angeles County Board of Supervisors at 25 cents for hikers (equivalent to $9 in 2025) and 50 cents for horseback. The new road was called the "New Mt. Wilson Trail", and it soon became more popular than the old Sierra Madre trail. Foot and pack animal traffic became so heavy that, in June 1893, the trail was widened to six feet to facilitate two-way travel.

== The Mt. Wilson observatories ==
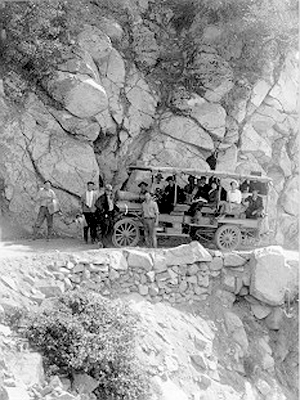
Autocar on the Mt. Wilson Toll Road

Gradually the Mt. Wilson Toll Road Company acquired control of most of the popular lands on the mountain. In 1896 they acquired both Strain's and Martin's camps, and in 1901 paid the United States General Land Office $800 for title to 640 acres (2.6 km^{2}) on the mountain top. In 1904, The Mount Wilson Toll Road Company enlarged its holdings to 1,050 acres (4 km^{2}). The company entered into a 99-year lease with the Carnegie Institution in 1905, providing 40 acres (160,000 m^{2}) of the mountain top for the location of a new observatory, today known as the Mount Wilson Observatory. Those involved with the new observatory were given free use of the toll road and half the water rights on the mountain. In return, the Carnegie Institution agreed that the public would always have access to the observatory.

The Carnegie Observatory renewed interest in Mt. Wilson and attracted sightseers to the mountain top. In 1905, to accommodate the many new visitors, the toll road company constructed a one-story hotel with cottages situated around the main building for guests staying overnight. Destroyed by a fire in 1913, the original hotel was replaced by a larger one on the same site which included a large swimming pool.

As new, larger telescopes were designed for the Carnegie Observatory, an automobile roadway became necessary to accommodate the trucks hauling parts up the mountain. In 1907 the trail was widened to ten feet with most of the work being done by hand with the use of Japanese laborers and mule-drawn scrapers. The road was widened to a full 12-foot (4 m) roadway in 1917 to facilitate the transportation of parts for the 100-inch (2,500 mm) Hooker Telescope.

Despite the advertised access for automobiles, the driving public was discouraged from using the toll road. First there was the fear of encountering large freight trucks servicing the observatories, unless drivers phoned ahead up the mountain. Then there were the sharp turns that required most cars to negotiate dangerously precipitous road edges. Mr. L.L. Whitman of Pasadena, who made the ascent in his 1907 Franklin, said "Not for five hundred dollars would I make the trip again." For those preferring not to drive, there was the popular Mt. Wilson Stage Line.

== In its closing years ==
By the early 1930s a new high speed highway was being built from La Cañada via the Arroyo Seco. The new Angeles Crest Highway was paved and ready for travel into Red Box Canyon and onward to Mt. Wilson from the back side by 1935. The historic Mt. Wilson Toll Road closed to the public in March, 1936 and was turned over to the United States Forest Service.

Today, the road is a popular hiking destination leading to Henninger Flats and Mount Wilson. The road can be accessed from a gate on Pinecrest in Altadena or from Eaton Canyon.

== See also ==
- Angeles National Forest
- Eaton Canyon
- Henninger Flats
