= Soto Street =

Road in Los Angeles, California

- Length: 6.4 mi (10.3 km)
- Nearest metro station: Soto
- South end: 33.9891°N 118.2194°W; Slauson Ave. in Huntington Park
- North end: 34.0771°N 118.1942°W; Huntington Dr./Mission Rd. in Los Angeles

Soto Street is a major north-south thoroughfare in Los Angeles, California, connecting the southernmost neighborhoods of the Eastside, as well as the southeastern suburbs of Vernon and Huntington Park.

It was first designated and paved as an arterial road in 1927. The street has been the focus of several significant ethnic communities over the years.

== Geography ==
Soto Street begins at its intersection with Slauson Avenue, shortly before entering Vernon and crossing the Los Angeles River. It then runs north through the neighborhoods of Boyle Heights, Brooklyn Heights.

In El Sereno, near Lincoln Heights, Soto Street merges with Mission Road to form Huntington Drive.

== History ==
In 1890 Soto Street was "a dirt road lined with pepper trees." By 1927 the city had decided to pave it as an arterial. The intersection of Soto Street and Brooklyn Avenue (now called Cesar Chavez Avenue) came to be considered the most important intersection in East Los Angeles, both when it was the center of the Los Angeles Jewish community (the largest Jewish community in the western United States) and later when it became the heart of the largest Mexican-American community in the country. It is the site of the landmark mural by East Los Streetscapers entitled El Corrido de Boyle Heights, and is the major transportation hub for the region. In 2004, a portion of the street in El Sereno known as the Soto Street Bridge, where Soto Street becomes Huntington Drive North, was declared functionally obsolete and scheduled for replacement. The bridge was constructed in 1936 as joint venture between the state, city and Pacific Electric Railway as an overpass of its Red Car system.

== Transportation ==
Metro Local lines 251 runs along Soto Street. The Metro E Line operates at a light rail underground station at the street's intersection with 1st Street in Boyle Heights.

== Notable Landmarks ==
- Lincoln Park
- LAC+USC Medical Center
- Salesian High School
- Sears Building, Soto Street and Olympic Boulevard
