= Angeles National Forest Fire Lookout Association =

Non-profit 501(c)(3) organization

- Founded: 1998; 28 years ago
- Founders: Pam and George Morey
- Region served: Angeles National Forest
- Website: anffla.org

The Angeles National Forest Fire Lookout Association (ANFFLA) is a nonprofit 501(c)(3) organization of citizen volunteers dedicated to the preservation, restoration, and operation of the fire lookout towers in the Angeles National Forest, Los Angeles County, and other Southern California areas. The organization works in partnership with the federal, state, county, and city agencies to meet these goals.

The Association was founded in 1998 by Pam and George Morey and several other members as an offshoot of the San Bernardino National Forest Association.

== Purpose ==
1. Restore, maintain and staff the remaining lookouts of the Angeles National Forest.
  1. The Association serves an additional role in that the volunteers are trained fire lookouts to call in smoke and fire reports thus enhancing the fire fighting capabilities of the U.S. Forest Service.
2. Interpret the natural and cultural history of the fire lookouts and the surrounding area for forest visitors.
3. Encourage visitors to participate actively in caring for all of our National Forests
4. Generate interest in and support for the fire lookout program

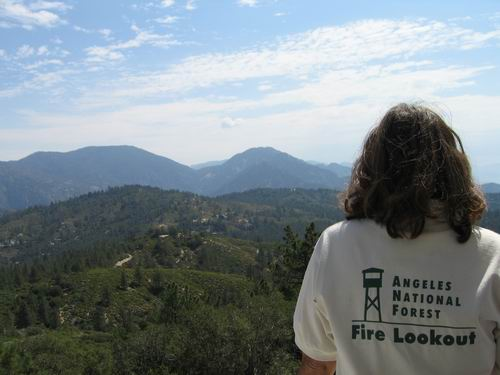
ANFFLA Fire Lookout, Penny, looks over the San Gabriel Mountains in the Angeles National Forest vigilant for any sign of smoke.

== Objectives ==
- Staff and maintain fire lookout towers of the Angeles National Forest and nearby Southern California area.
- Assist the Angeles National Forest Dispatch/Fire Suppression Staff by providing radio relay, accurate smoke reports and remote eyes and ears for incident assessment as needed
- Assist the Angeles National Forest Fire Prevention Staff through interpretive delivery of key fire prevention messages and hands-on experience with the Osborne Fire Finder and related devices
- Assist the Angeles National Forest Recreation Staff by providing general recreation information
- Assist the Angeles National Forest by greeting visitors, and providing general forest orientation, information and assistance
- Provide informal and impromptu interpretation of the surrounding area both cultural and historical
- Create a positive image for the U.S. Forest Service, Angeles National Forest Fire Lookout Association, volunteers, partners and sponsors

== Fire lookout towers ==
Fire lookout towers
Lookout Name	Information	Photo	Listing
Vetter Mountain	Restored 1998. The Vetter Mountain Fire Lookout was destroyed in the 2009 Station Fire. Since then, Vetter Mountain lookouts have been using a temporary open-air structure near the original foundation through 2018. In 2019, the "temporary structure" was relocated to Josephine Peak for the fire season while SCE and the ANF worked to rebuild the tower. The rebuilt tower was completed in May 2020.		
Slide Mountain	The Slide Mountain Lookout, located above Pyramid Lake off Interstate 5, was built in 1969 as part of the Pyramid Reservoir project. It was restored by ANFFLA and operational since 2003. Situated on the east end of Dome Mountain (Los Angeles County), this lookout is open all year long, and hearty volunteers are needed, as it is a 3-hour uphill hike to the lookout.		
Johnstone Peak	This tower was relocated from Johnstone Peak to the Los Angeles County Fair held in Pomona, California. The lookout is staffed in cooperation with the Angeles Volunteer Association. Thousands of visitors to this steel tower receive Fire Prevention messages and a brief look into the life of a fire lookout.		
South Mount Hawkins	Built 1935, closed 1981(?), restored and operational 1999, destroyed by the Curve Fire in 2002.		
Warm Springs Mountain	The Warm Springs Lookout Tower cab was destroyed by in the Ruby Ridge Fire of 1987, however the steel tower remains intact. At one point in time, the Angeles National Forest Fire Lookout Association (ANFFLA) had plans to restore this lookout but has since abandoned this project.		
Castro Peak	Relocated from Castro Peak, this small fire lookout tower is now located in Henninger Flats. It is a static display and property of the Los Angeles County Fire Department. Preliminary "no obligation" talks regarding ANFFLA volunteers providing interpretive services will be held in the fall of 2006 between ANFFLA and LACoFD.		

== Membership ==
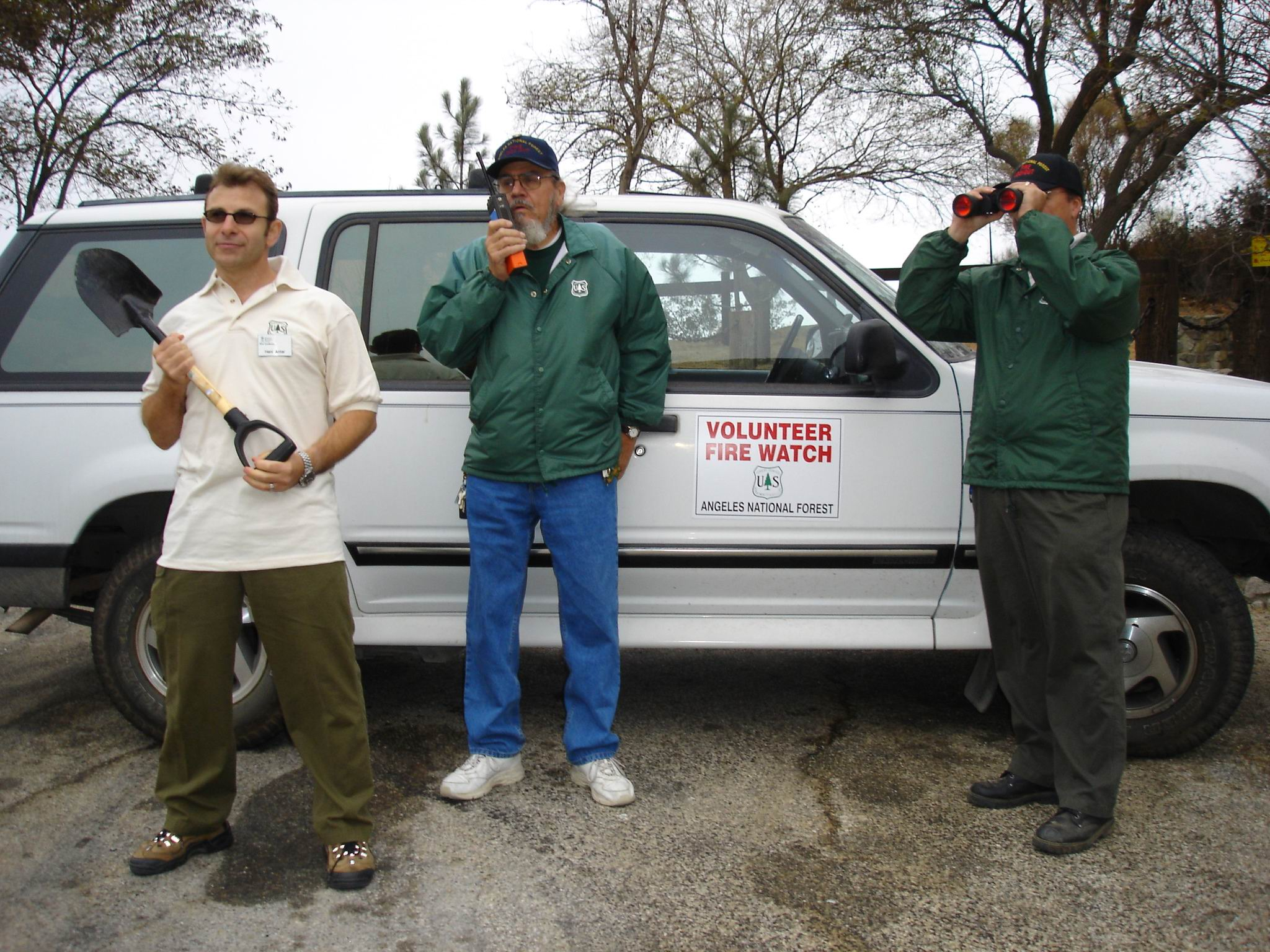
The Volunteer Fire Watch program was created during the extreme dry conditions near the end of the 2004 fire season where record low fuel moisture levels caused the entire National Forest to be closed. The ANFFLA volunteers mobilized to create a Fire Watch program from their privately owned vehicles.

The association is open to all people, aged 18 or older. They must attend required training to join, and attend a "re-up" session once a year usually held in the Spring before the start of the fire season.

=== Training ===
All new members are required to attend 3 instructional classes consisting of "Introduction", "Interpretation", and "Operations" in order to be a member. To be a qualified fire lookout, one must also attend an "in-tower" training class at the lookout tower of their choice. In order to be qualified for more than one tower, the applicant must attend an "in-tower" training at each of the towers. Each year, returning members must attend a yearly "re-up" session.

=== Meetings ===
Monthly meetings are held each month are known as "super sessions" where safety, operational, and other administrative information is disseminated. The meetings begins with a potluck dinner and end with a talk or presentation by a guest speaker or fellow member.
