= East Pasadena, California =

- Unincorporated community Census-designated place
- Location of East Pasadena in Los Angeles County, California.

- Location in the United States
- Coordinates: 34°8′24″N 118°4′40″W
- Country: United States
- State: California
- County: Los Angeles

Area
  - Total: 1.32 sq mi (3.43 km^{2})
  - Land: 1.32 sq mi (3.41 km^{2})
  - Water: 0.0039 sq mi (0.01 km^{2}) 0.39%
- Elevation: 725 ft (221 m)

Population (2020)
  - Total: 6,021
  - Density: 4,570.7/sq mi (1,764.74/km^{2})
- Time zone: UTC-8 (PST)
  - Summer (DST): UTC-7 (PDT)
- ZIP code: 91107
- Area code: 626
- FIPS code: 06-20984
- GNIS feature ID: 1660585

East Pasadena is an unincorporated community and census-designated place (CDP) in the San Gabriel Valley of Los Angeles County, California, United States. The population was 6,021 at the 2020 census, down from 6,144 at the 2010 census. For statistical purposes, the United States Census Bureau has defined East Pasadena as a census-designated place (CDP).

== Geography ==
The land area of East Pasadena is bordered by Pasadena city limits on the north, California Boulevard on the south, Michillinda Avenue (Arcadia city limits) on the east, and San Gabriel Boulevard on the west.

The community has become considerably smaller as the city of Pasadena has expanded its boundaries to include more of the unincorporated area of East Pasadena. East Pasadena used to include a smaller non-contiguous district to the west that was separated into a different CDP, San Pasqual, in 2010.

According to the United States Census Bureau, the CDP has a total area of 1.3 square miles (3.4 km^{2}), all land. The definition of the area was created by the Census Bureau for statistical purposes and may not precisely correspond to local understanding of the area with the same name.

Much of the Chapman Woods development is located in unincorporated East Pasadena, though portions are in the City of Pasadena. Chapman Woods is bordered by Del Mar Boulevard to the north, Huntington Drive to the south, the Eaton Wash to the west, and Highway 19 (Rosemead Boulevard) to the east. Chapman Woods is named after Alfred Chapman who purchased the surrounding land and built his home on the corner of present-day California Boulevard and Ivydale Court. All entrances into the neighborhood are marked with signs that say "Chapman Woods".

There is heavy commercial development on Foothill Boulevard, Colorado Boulevard, and Highway 19. The central feature of the neighborhood is Willard Elementary School and Wilson Middle School, which face each other across Madre Street.

== Demographics ==
Historical population
| Census | Pop. | Note | %± |
|---|---|---|---|
| 1990 | 5,910 | | — |
| 2000 | 6,045 | | 2.3% |
| 2010 | 6,144 | | 1.6% |
| 2020 | 6,021 | | −2.0% |
U.S. Decennial Census; 1850–1870 1880-1890; 1900 1910 1920; 1930 1940 1950; 1960 1970 1980; 1990 2000 2010; 2020

East Pasadena first appeared as a census-designated place in the 1990 U.S. census part of the Pasadena Census Community Division (CCD).

=== Racial and ethnic composition ===
East Pasadena CDP, California – Racial and ethnic composition Note: the US Census treats Hispanic/Latino as an ethnic category. This table excludes Latinos from the racial categories and assigns them to a separate category. Hispanics/Latinos may be of any race.
| Race / Ethnicity (NH = Non-Hispanic) | Pop 1990 | Pop 2000 | Pop 2010 | Pop 2020 | % 1990 | % 2000 | % 2010 | % 2020 |
|---|---|---|---|---|---|---|---|---|
| White alone (NH) | 3,137 | 2,302 | 2,082 | 1,502 | 53.08% | 38.08% | 33.89% | 24.95% |
| Black or African American alone (NH) | 102 | 144 | 153 | 159 | 1.73% | 2.38% | 2.49% | 2.64% |
| Native American or Alaska Native alone (NH) | 32 | 20 | 19 | 7 | 0.54% | 0.33% | 0.31% | 0.12% |
| Asian alone (NH) | 900 | 1,207 | 1,575 | 1,928 | 15.23% | 19.97% | 25.63% | 32.02% |
| Native Hawaiian or Pacific Islander alone (NH) | 900 | 3 | 2 | 12 | 15.23% | 0.05% | 0.03% | 0.20% |
| Other race alone (NH) | 1 | 6 | 14 | 38 | 0.02% | 0.10% | 0.23% | 0.63% |
| Mixed race or Multiracial (NH) | x | 233 | 160 | 201 | x | 3.85% | 2.60% | 3.34% |
| Hispanic or Latino (any race) | 1,738 | 2,130 | 2,139 | 2,174 | 29.41% | 35.24% | 34.81% | 36.11% |
| Total | 5,910 | 6,045 | 6,144 | 6,021 | 100.00% | 100.00% | 100.00% | 100.00% |

=== 2020 census ===
As of the 2020 census, East Pasadena had a population of 6,021. The population density was 4,571.8 inhabitants per square mile (1,765.2/km^{2}). The racial makeup was 30.0% White, 2.8% African American, 1.0% Native American, 32.4% Asian, 0.2% Pacific Islander, 17.6% from other races, and 15.9% from two or more races. Hispanic or Latino of any race were 36.1% of the population.

The census reported that 99.6% of the population lived in households, 0.2% lived in non-institutionalized group quarters, and 0.2% were institutionalized. In addition, 100.0% of residents lived in urban areas, while 0.0% lived in rural areas.

There were 2,082 households, of which 29.3% had children under the age of 18 living in them. Of all households, 51.5% were married-couple households, 6.0% were cohabiting couple households, 17.1% had a male householder with no spouse or partner present, and 25.5% had a female householder with no spouse or partner present. About 22.1% of all households were made up of individuals, and 9.2% had someone living alone who was 65 years of age or older. The average household size was 2.88. There were 1,484 families (71.3% of all households).

The age distribution was 17.7% under the age of 18, 8.7% aged 18 to 24, 27.4% aged 25 to 44, 26.7% aged 45 to 64, and 19.5% who were 65 years of age or older. The median age was 42.0 years. For every 100 females, there were 94.8 males, and for every 100 females age 18 and over there were 93.7 males age 18 and over.

There were 2,227 housing units at an average density of 1,691.0 units per square mile (652.9 units/km^{2}), of which 2,082 (93.5%) were occupied and 6.5% were vacant. Of occupied units, 64.0% were owner-occupied and 36.0% were occupied by renters. The homeowner vacancy rate was 1.1% and the rental vacancy rate was 4.9%.

=== Income and poverty ===
In 2023, the US Census Bureau estimated that the median household income was $105,714, and the per capita income was $55,047. About 4.4% of families and 6.4% of the population were below the poverty line.

== Wildlife ==
Feral peafowl are common in East Pasadena, Arcadia, San Marino and other west San Gabriel Valley communities. In 2021, the Los Angeles County Board of Supervisors moved to ban the feeding of peafowl due to the increasing population in recent decades. The municipal codes of the cities of Pasadena and Arcadia already prohibit feeding peafowl.

== Government ==
=== County ===
The Los Angeles County Sheriff's Department (LASD) operates the Temple Station in Temple City, serving East Pasadena.

=== State and federal ===
In the state legislature East Pasadena is located in the 25th senatorial district, represented by Democrat Sasha Renée Pérez and in the 49th Assembly district, represented by Democrat Mike Fong. Federally, East Pasadena is located in California's 28th congressional district, represented by Democrat Judy Chu.

== Education ==
East Pasadena is served by the San Marino Unified School District serving the southwest portion and Pasadena Unified School District serving the Rosemead Boulevard corridor.

== Transportation ==
The Metro A Line has a station on Sierra Madre Villa Avenue and Foothill Boulevard. The neighborhood overall is served by Metro Local lines 266 and 267; Pasadena Transit routes 31, 32, 40 and 60; and Foothill Transit Route 187.

== In popular culture ==
A fictionalized City of "East Pasadena" is depicted in the TV series Law & Order: LA.
