= East San Gabriel, California =

- Unincorporated community Census designated place
- Interactive map of East San Gabriel, California
- Location in the United States
- Coordinates: 34°7′9″N 118°4′55″W
- Country: United States
- State: California
- County: Los Angeles

Area
  - Total: 2.192 sq mi (5.677 km^{2})
  - Land: 2.178 sq mi (5.642 km^{2})
  - Water: 0.014 sq mi (0.035 km^{2}) 0.62%
- Elevation: 377 ft (115 m)

Population (2020)
  - Total: 22,769
  - Density: 10,450/sq mi (4,036/km^{2})
- Time zone: UTC-8 (PST)
  - Summer (DST): UTC-7 (PDT)
- ZIP code: 91775
- Area code: 626
- FIPS code: 06-21096
- GNIS feature ID: 1669849

East San Gabriel is an unincorporated community and census-designated place (CDP) in the San Gabriel Valley of Los Angeles County, California, United States. The population was 22,769 at the 2020 census, up from 14,874 at the 2010 census.

== Geography ==
East San Gabriel is located at 34°7′9″N 118°4′55″W (34.119149, -118.082053).

According to the United States Census Bureau, the CDP has a total area of 2.2 square miles (5.7 km^{2}), of which 2.2 square miles (5.7 km^{2}) is land and 0.62% is water.

=== Surrounding areas ===
East Pasadena
San Marino Arcadia
San Marino / San Gabriel Arcadia / Temple City
San Gabriel Temple City
Rosemead

== Demographics ==
Historical population
Census	Pop.	Note	%±
1990	12,736		—
2000	14,512		13.9%
2010	14,874		2.5%
2020	22,769		53.1%
U.S. Decennial Census; 1850–1870 1880-1890; 1900 1910 1920; 1930 1940 1950; 1960 1970 1980; 1990 2000 2010; 2020

East San Gabriel first appeared as a census designated place in the 1990 U.S. census. Prior to 1990, the area belonging to the community was part of the unincorporated Southwest San Gabriel Valley division.

=== Racial and ethnic composition ===
East San Gabriel CDP, California – Racial and ethnic composition Note: the US Census treats Hispanic/Latino as an ethnic category. This table excludes Latinos from the racial categories and assigns them to a separate category. Hispanics/Latinos may be of any race.
Race / Ethnicity (NH = Non-Hispanic)	Pop 2000	Pop 2010	Pop 2020	% 2000	% 2010	% 2020
White alone (NH)	4,511	3,251	3,145	31.08%	21.86%	13.81%
Black or African American alone (NH)	256	216	255	1.76%	1.45%	1.12%
Native American or Alaska Native alone (NH)	35	16	31	0.24%	0.11%	0.14%
Asian alone (NH)	5,843	7,372	12,481	40.26%	49.56%	54.82%
Native Hawaiian or Pacific Islander alone (NH)	13	3	16	0.09%	0.02%	0.07%
Other race alone (NH)	38	25	99	0.26%	0.17%	0.43%
Mixed race or Multiracial (NH)	403	291	524	2.78%	1.96%	2.30%
Hispanic or Latino (any race)	3,413	3,700	6,218	23.52%	24.88%	27.31%
Total	14,512	14,874	22,769	100.00%	100.00%	100.00%

=== 2020 census ===
As of the 2020 census, East San Gabriel had a population of 22,769 and a population density of 10,454.1 inhabitants per square mile (4,036.4/km^{2}).

The census reported that 99.2% of residents lived in households, 0.3% lived in non-institutionalized group quarters, and 0.4% were institutionalized; 100.0% lived in urban areas and 0.0% lived in rural areas.

The age distribution was 19.2% under the age of 18, 8.6% aged 18 to 24, 26.3% aged 25 to 44, 28.1% aged 45 to 64, and 17.7% who were 65 years of age or older; the median age was 41.8 years. For every 100 females, there were 94.2 males, and for every 100 females age 18 and over there were 91.6 males age 18 and over.

Racial composition as of the 2020 census
Race	Number	Percent
White	4,144	18.2%
Black or African American	293	1.3%
American Indian and Alaska Native	256	1.1%
Asian	12,572	55.2%
Native Hawaiian and Other Pacific Islander	17	0.1%
Some other race	3,241	14.2%
Two or more races	2,246	9.9%
Hispanic or Latino (of any race)	6,218	27.3%

There were 7,559 households, of which 32.7% had children under the age of 18 living in them. Of all households, 52.2% were married-couple households, 5.0% were cohabiting couple households, 26.3% were households with a female householder and no spouse or partner present, and 16.4% were households with a male householder and no spouse or partner present. About 18.7% of all households were made up of individuals and 6.9% had someone living alone who was 65 years of age or older; the average household size was 2.99. The census recorded 5,712 families (75.6% of all households).

There were 7,957 housing units at an average density of 3,653.4 units per square mile (1,410.6 units/km^{2}), of which 5.0% were vacant. Of the occupied units, 53.6% were owner-occupied and 46.4% were occupied by renters. The homeowner vacancy rate was 0.8% and the rental vacancy rate was 3.6%.

=== 2010 census ===
At the 2010 census East San Gabriel had a population of 14,874. The population density was 9,444.2 inhabitants per square mile (3,646.4/km^{2}). The racial makeup of East San Gabriel was 5,037 (33.9%) White (21.9% Non-Hispanic White), 243 (1.6%) African American, 58 (0.4%) Native American, 7,421 (49.9%) Asian, 3 (0.0%) Pacific Islander, 1,602 (10.8%) from other races, and 510 (3.4%) from two or more races. Hispanic or Latino of any race were 3,700 persons (24.9%).

The census reported that 14,868 people (100% of the population) lived in households, no one lived in non-institutionalized group quarters and 6 (0%) were institutionalized.

There were 5,134 households, 1,882 (36.7%) had children under the age of 18 living in them, 2,871 (55.9%) were opposite-sex married couples living together, 650 (12.7%) had a female householder with no husband present, 313 (6.1%) had a male householder with no wife present. There were 177 (3.4%) unmarried opposite-sex partnerships, and 32 (0.6%) same-sex married couples or partnerships. 1,064 households (20.7%) were one person and 387 (7.5%) had someone living alone who was 65 or older. The average household size was 2.90. There were 3,834 families (74.7% of households); the average family size was 3.35.

The age distribution was 3,255 people (21.9%) under the age of 18, 1,154 people (7.8%) aged 18 to 24, 4,139 people (27.8%) aged 25 to 44, 4,304 people (28.9%) aged 45 to 64, and 2,022 people (13.6%) who were 65 or older. The median age was 40.2 years. For every 100 females, there were 94.0 males. For every 100 females age 18 and over, there were 90.3 males.

There were 5,365 housing units at an average density of 3,406.5 per square mile, of the occupied units 2,939 (57.2%) were owner-occupied and 2,195 (42.8%) were rented. The homeowner vacancy rate was 1.0%; the rental vacancy rate was 5.8%. 8,913 people (59.9% of the population) lived in owner-occupied housing units and 5,955 people (40.0%) lived in rental housing units.

According to the 2010 United States Census, East San Gabriel had a median household income of $69,946, with 7.9% of the population living below the federal poverty line.

=== Income ===
In 2023, the US Census Bureau estimated that the median household income was $107,184, and the per capita income was $43,950. About 8.3% of families and 10.6% of the population were below the poverty line.

== Government ==
In the California State Legislature, East San Gabriel is in the 25th senatorial district, represented by Democrat Sasha Renée Pérez, and in the 49th Assembly district, represented by Democrat Mike Fong.

In the United States House of Representatives, East San Gabriel is in California's 28th congressional district, represented by Democrat Judy Chu.

== See also ==
- San Gabriel, California
