= Powell, Arizona =

Ghost town in Mohave County, Arizona, US

- Ghost town
- Location within Arizona Location within the United States
- Coordinates: 34°44′14″N 114°22′37″W
- Country: United States
- State: Arizona
- County: Mohave
- Founded: 1883
- Time zone: UTC-7 (MST (no DST))

Powell was a railroad station and settlement in Mohave County, Arizona, United States from 1883 to 1890.

== History ==
Powell was a station on the Atlantic and Pacific Railroad, at the point where the railroad began crossing the lower Mohave Valley to the Colorado River bridge at the station at Eastbridge, Arizona southeast of Needles, California. It had a post office from October 11, 1883 until it was discontinued July 9, 1886, in favor of Mohave City. From 1903 to 1909 Mellen had its own post office.

The bridge across the Colorado River constructed at Eastbridge station in 1883 was washed out or undermined by the spring flooding of the river in 1884, 1886 and 1888. Finally they changed the railroad route southward Beal to Mellen, where from 1889 to May 1890 they built the Red Rock Bridge, a cantilever bridge, on rock foundations, unlike the previous site. The section of track between where the line changed direction to the new bridge, to the station of Powell and the bridge and station at Eastbridge, was abandoned in 1890.

== The site today ==
The site of Powell lies under the waters of Goose Lake in Topock Marsh near where the remnant of the old rail bed descends into the waters of the marsh.
