= U.S. Route 66 in California =

Former U.S. Highway in California

U.S. Route 66
- Will Rogers Highway
- One of the former routings of Route 66 in California.

Route information
- Maintained by CDOH
- Length: 316 mi (509 km)
- Existed: November 11, 1926–June 25, 1979
- Tourist routes: Historic Route 66 (in its entirety); National Scenic Byway (Barstow to Needles)

Major junctions
- West end: US 101 Alt. in Santa Monica
- US 6 / US 99 / US 101 in Los Angeles; US 91 / US 395 in San Bernardino; US 395 in Hesperia; US 91 in Barstow; US 95 through Needles
- East end: US 66 at the Arizona state line near Topock

Location
- Country: United States
- State: California
- Counties: Los Angeles, San Bernardino

Highway system
- United States Numbered Highway System; List; Special; Divided; State highways in California; Interstate; US; State; Scenic; History; Pre‑1964; Unconstructed; Deleted; Freeways
← SR 65	→ SR 66

U.S. Route 66 (US 66, Route 66) is a part of a former United States Numbered Highway in the state of California that ran from the west in Santa Monica on the Pacific Ocean through Los Angeles and San Bernardino to Needles at the Arizona state line. It was truncated during the 1964 renumbering and its signage removed in 1974. The highway is now mostly replaced with several streets in Los Angeles, State Route 2 (SR 2), SR 110, SR 66, County Route 66 (CR 66) in San Bernardino County, Interstate 15 (I-15), and I-40.

== History ==
US 66 was assigned by the American Association of State Highway Officials in November 1926 and signed in 1928 by the Automobile Club of Southern California; however, historic US 66 shields and even present day US 66 shields remain. US 66 continued to be signed east of Pasadena until 1974, when it was removed, and the remaining separate section became SR 66.

In 1977, "Hotel California" alluded to Route 66 in its opening lines, "On a dark desert highway, cool wind in my hair, Warm smell of colitas rising up through the air, Up ahead in the distance, I saw a shimmering light, My head grew heavy and my sight grew dim, I had to stop for the night". According to Eagles guitarist Don Felder, "Everybody had driven into Los Angeles on what used to be Route 66. And as you drive in through the desert at night, you can see the glow of Los Angeles from a hundred miles away. The closer and closer you get, you start seeing all of these images, and these things pounded into our heads: the stars on Hollywood Boulevard, movie stars, palm trees, beaches and girls in bikinis."

Nationally, Route 66 has been a decommissioned highway since 1985, with the last section through Williams, Arizona, bypassed by I-40 in 1984. The first efforts to return the route to maps as "Historic Route 66" date to 1987 and Angel Delgadillo's Arizona Historic Route 66 Association. This initiative was soon followed in all eight US 66 states, including California.

The California Historic Route 66 Association, established in December 1990 to advocate the preservation, restoration and promotion of historic Route 66 in California, is the youngest of the eight state-level Route 66 Associations.

Because the sections of historic Route 66 that are within urban Los Angeles (San Bernardino to Santa Monica) are still dedicated streets, they remain as the most used and heavily traveled Route 66 segments. However, because of the heavy traffic and later non-historic development along these sections, they are generally the least traveled by Route 66 enthusiasts. Modern guide books that describe how to follow historic Route 66 frequently suggest that when arriving at San Bernardino from the east, enthusiasts should enter Interstate 10 as a bypass for these segments exiting near Santa Monica to experience today's terminus.

In 2018, U.S. Bicycle Route 66 was established that follows portions of historic Route 66 within California and other areas in the country.

A portion of Route 66 in San Bernardino county is closed for bridge repairs.

=== Old Trails Highway ===
National Old Trails Road
- Location: Main route: Los Angeles–Topock, AZ; San Francisco, CA branch: San Francisco–Barstow
- Existed: 1914–1927

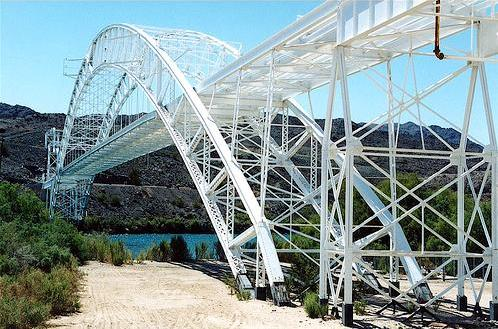
1916 Trails Arch Bridge spanning the Colorado River

From San Bernardino to the Arizona state line US 66 followed the old National Old Trails Road. The old highway veers away from I-15 between Victorville and Barstow, following the railroad through Oro Grande, Helendale, and Lenwood. Through Barstow, it is Main Street. East of Barstow, the National Old Trails Highway passes through a Marine Corps base, limiting public access and forcing traffic onto I-40. From Daggett, Historic 66 leaves I-40, crossing it three times before winding away through Bagdad, Amboy, and Essex. US 66 was all paved in California by 1935.

This area is desert; towns like Amboy originated as Atlantic and Pacific Railroad stops and were sustained by Route 66 traffic during the Mother Road's heyday, then became ghost towns when I-40 bypassed them to the north. From Essex the highway was Goffs Road through Goffs until about 1931, joining I-40 at the US 95 exit. The later alignment is now I-40 east of Essex. The original highway winds around I-40 in the Needles area, before crossing the Colorado River into Arizona.

== Route description ==
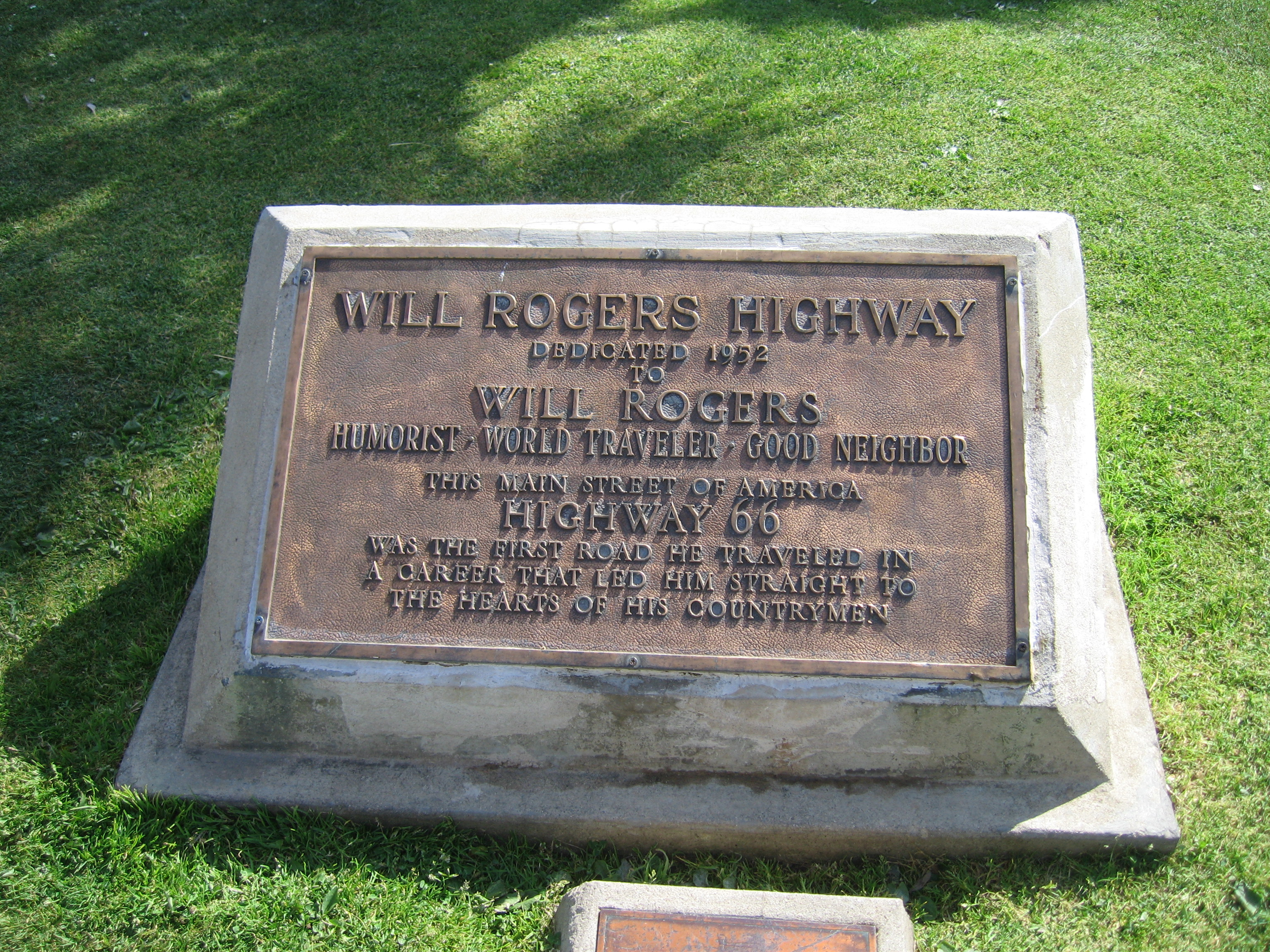
Will Rogers Monument near the western terminus of Route 66 in Santa Monica

=== Santa Monica to San Bernardino ===
The original western terminus of Route 66 was in downtown Los Angeles at the intersection of 7th street and Broadway Ave. In 1935, the route was extended to Santa Monica. In Santa Monica, US 66 started at the intersection of Lincoln and Olympic Blvd at U.S. 101A. Route 66 headed north on Lincoln and then turned east onto Santa Monica Boulevard, which was, from the Santa Monica city line with Los Angeles up to U.S. Route 101, added to SR 2 during the 1964 renumbering, the same name it had before 1936. In today's terms, it followed Santa Monica Boulevard to its eastern terminus, then continued to the southeast as Sunset Boulevard up to the Arroyo Seco (110) Parkway, at the interchange with the Hollywood (101) Freeway.

The highway then ran northwards on SR 110 from Los Angeles to Colorado Boulevard in Pasadena. Prior to the opening of the Arroyo Seco Parkway, US 66 began north on Broadway which curves east, ending at Mission Avenue. The highway then continued north on Mission which turns into Huntington Drive and then turns north onto Fair Oaks Avenue until meeting Colorado Boulevard. After the extension to Santa Monica, the route moved to Figueroa Street from Sunset Boulevard to Colorado Boulevard until the opening of the Arroyo Seco.

From Downtown Pasadena, the highway continued east on Colorado Boulevard. In Arcadia, when crossing North Baldwin Avenue, Colorado Boulevard becomes Colorado Street, and after 0.3 miles (0.48 km) it changes again to Colorado Place. The highway then continues as Huntington Drive eastwards through Arcadia, Monrovia, and Duarte. After the road crosses the San Gabriel River into Irwindale, it becomes Foothill Boulevard after 5.7 miles (9.2 km). In Azusa, the highway veers away from Foothill Boulevard, becoming Alosta Avenue. The city of Glendora renamed their segment of Alosta Avenue to Route 66; the highway is known as Foothill Boulevard again when it enters into San Dimas.

Foothill Boulevard is then numbered SR 66 from the interchange with the Foothill (210) Freeway in La Verne onward until the road crosses into San Bernardino, where it becomes Fifth Street. SR 66 ends at the 5th Street interchange with I-215 in San Bernardino.

=== San Bernardino to the Arizona state line ===
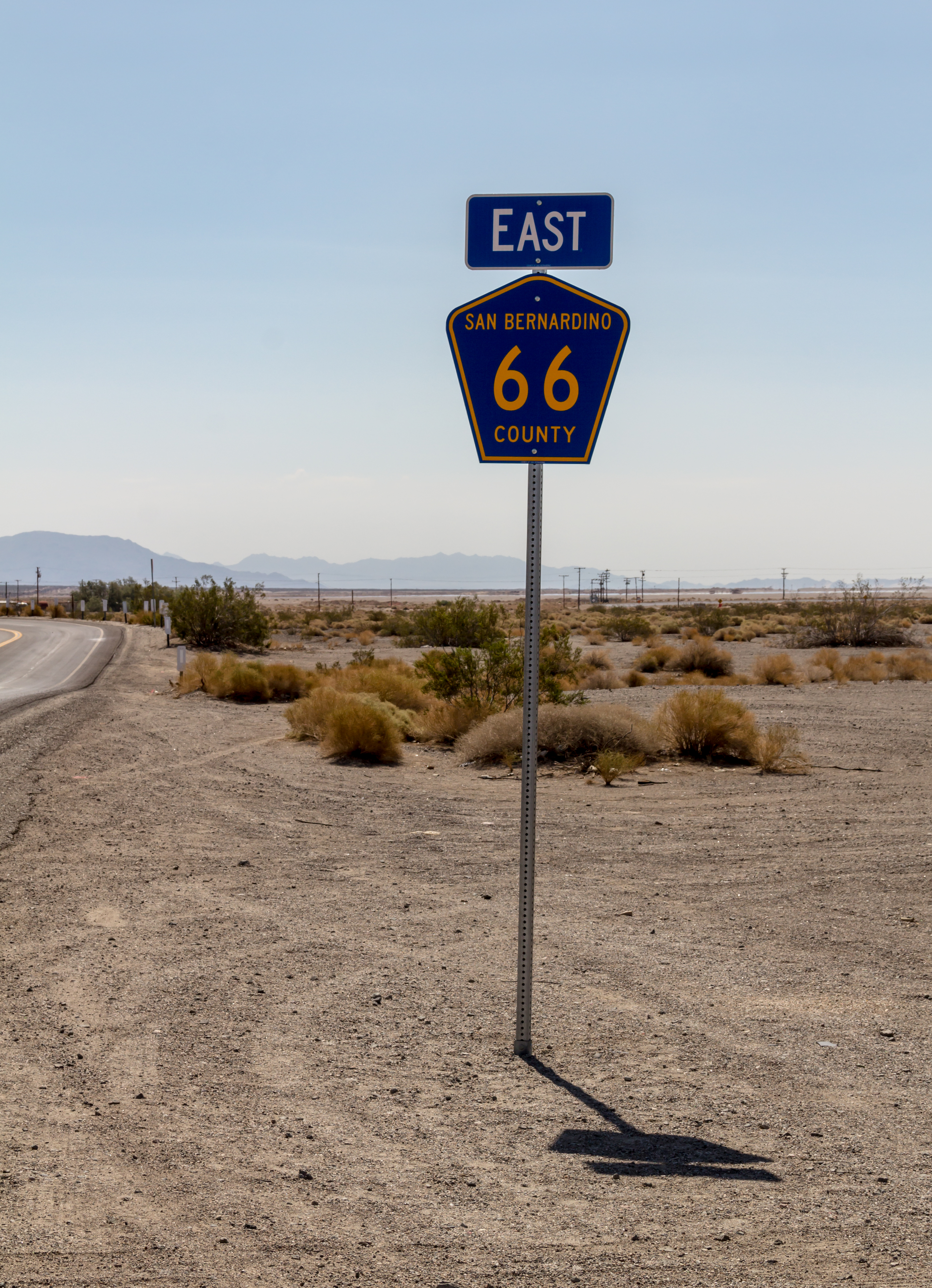
CR 66 sign near Amboy

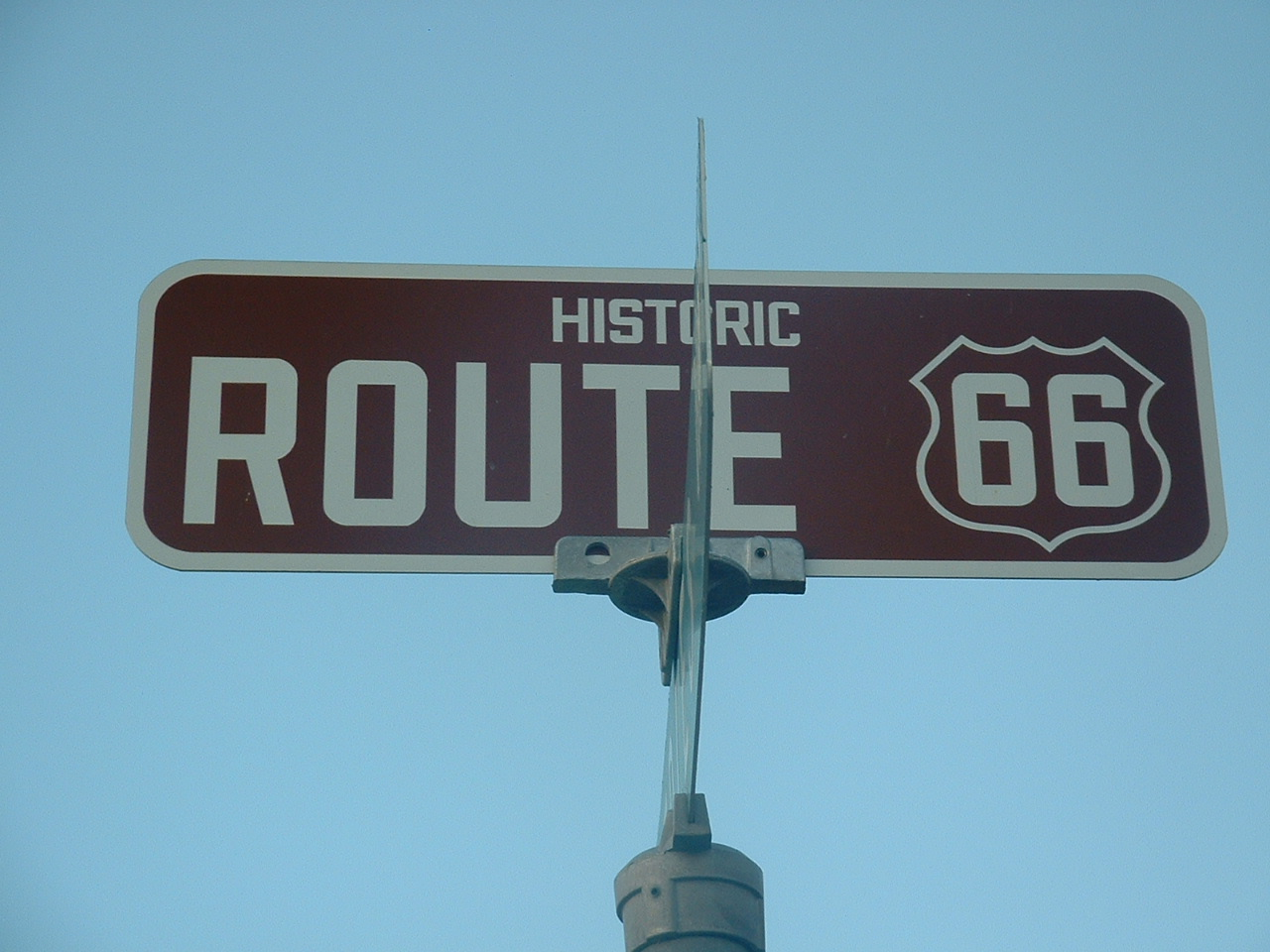
Route 66 highway sign, near Needles.

US 66 originally exited San Bernardino on Mount Vernon Avenue and Cajon Boulevard, which meandered its way up to Cajon Pass. US 66 originally followed 7th Street and D Street through Victorville then the National Old Trails Highway through Barstow, California (where it took on the name "Main Street") and across the Mojave Desert to Needles. US 66 followed Broadway Street through Needles, then crossed into Arizona on the Trails Arch Bridge (1916-1946) or the Red Rock Bridge (converted from railroad bridge in 1946, abandoned 1966, dismantled 1976).

By 1964, most or all of this part of the route had been replaced by three Interstate highways, the first being I-215, known as I-15 in 1964. It followed I-215 from SR 66 up to I-15. After I-15, the highway followed I-40 until it got to the state line with Arizona in Needles.

== Major intersections ==
County	Location	mi	km	Destinations	Notes
Los Angeles	Santa Monica	0.0	0.0	US 101 Alt. (Lincoln Boulevard/Roosevelt Highway) / SR 26 east (Olympic Boulevard) – Oxnard	now SR 1
Los Angeles	Los Angeles	3.9	6.3	SR 7 (Sepulveda Boulevard)	
Los Angeles	Los Angeles	11.0	17.7	Highland Avenue (Legislative Route 160)	now SR 170
Los Angeles	Los Angeles	14.4	23.2	US 101 north (Sunset Boulevard) – Sacramento	west end of US 101 overlap
Los Angeles	Los Angeles	15.9	25.6	SR 2 east	
Los Angeles	Los Angeles	17.5	28.2	US 6 west / SR 11 south (Figueroa Street) / US 99 south / US 101 south (Macy Street) – Santa Ana, San Pedro	east end of US 101 overlap; west end of US 6/US 99/SR 11 overlap
Los Angeles	Los Angeles	18.9	30.4	Figueroa Street Tunnels under Elysian Park	
Los Angeles	Los Angeles			Riverside Drive – Griffith Park, Burbank	
Los Angeles	Los Angeles			Figueroa Street Viaduct over Los Angeles River	
Los Angeles	Los Angeles	19.7	31.7	US 6 east / US 99 north (Avenue 26/Legislative Route 4) – Sacramento	east end of US 6/US 99 overlap
Los Angeles	Los Angeles	24.5	39.4	SR 134 west (Colorado Boulevard) – Ventura	
Los Angeles	Pasadena			Colorado Street Bridge over Arroyo Seco	
Los Angeles	Pasadena			SR 11 north (Linda Vista Avenue)	interchange; east end of SR 11 overlap
Los Angeles	Pasadena			SR 118 west (Fair Oaks Avenue) – San Fernando	
Los Angeles	Pasadena			Broadway (Legislative Route 205)	post-1940 US 66 west (via Arroyo Seco Parkway)
Los Angeles	Pasadena	29.7	47.8	Altadena Drive (Legislative Route 9 east)	
Los Angeles	Pasadena	31.2	50.2	SR 19 south (Rosemead Boulevard)	
Los Angeles	Arcadia	33.6	54.1	Huntington Drive (Colorado Place west)	
Los Angeles	Monrovia	36.5	58.7	Mountain Avenue (Legislative Route 9 west)	
Los Angeles	Azusa	41.1	66.1	SR 39 (Azusa Avenue)	
Los Angeles		49.1	79.0	SR 30 east (Baseline Road)	
Los Angeles		51.6	83.0	SR 71 south (Garey Avenue) – Pomona	
San Bernardino	Upland	57.2	92.1	Euclid Avenue (Legislative Route 192)	now SR 83
San Bernardino	San Bernardino	76.6	123.3	US 91 south / US 395 south / US 66 Bus. east / SR 18 (5th Street/Mount Vernon Avenue) – Riverside	west end of US 91/US 395 overlap
San Bernardino	San Bernardino	78.5	126.3	SR 30 (Highland Avenue)	
San Bernardino	Devore	84.9	136.6	US 66 Bus. west (Kendall Drive)	
San Bernardino	Cajon Junction	95.9	154.3	SR 2 east – Silverwood Lake, Summit Valley	west end of SR 2 overlap; now SR 138 east
San Bernardino	Cajon Junction			SR 2 west / SR 138 west – Palmdale, Wrightwood	east end of SR 2 overlap
San Bernardino	Hesperia	103.8	167.0	US 395 north – Adelanto, Bishop	east end of US 395 overlap
San Bernardino	Victorville	115.8	186.4	SR 18 east (D Street) – Apple Valley	
San Bernardino	Barstow	152.0	244.6	US 91 north (North 1st Avenue) to US 466 – Las Vegas, Bakersfield	east end of US 91 overlap
San Bernardino		294	473	US 95 north – Searchlight, Las Vegas	west end of US 95 overlap
San Bernardino		306	492	US 95 south – Blythe	east end of US 95 overlap
San Bernardino		316	509	US 66 east	Arizona state line
1.000 mi = 1.609 km; 1.000 km = 0.621 mi

== Structures ==
=== Art installations ===
In 2026, California cities along Route 66 celebrated the centennial anniversary by establishing a temporary public arts corridor. Artists, including Luciana Abait, created murals, sculptures, and other installations to highlight the history of Route 66 and celebrate its impact.

=== Restaurants ===
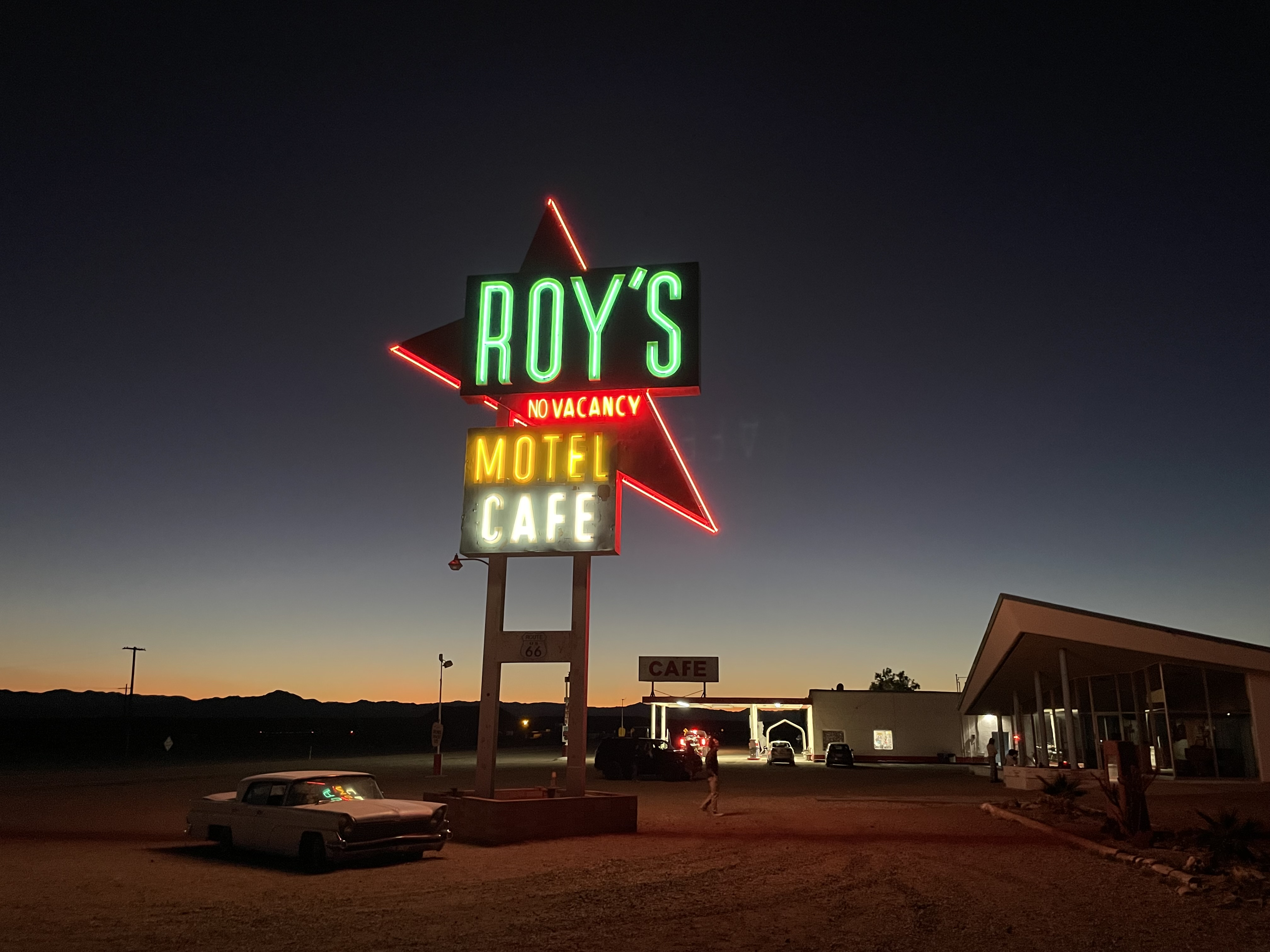
Roy's in the Mojave Desert at Amboy

Roy's Motel and Café was once the largest roadside business in what is now the desert ghost town of Amboy, California. The motel has been closed for years as the town died when Interstate 40 in California diverted traffic ten miles further north. Amboy, as a ghost town, had been used as a filming location for various movies. More recently, the Roy's filling station and café have operated at least sporadically in an attempt to preserve this landmark for tourism.

The Summit Inn, a diner and filling station originally located in 1928 at the summit of the Cajon Pass, moved to Oak Hills, California when the highway was re-routed in 1952. Its visitors include Elvis Presley, reported to have kicked the jukebox and left without dining after finding none of his own records among the available selections. The building was destroyed by the Blue Cut Fire on August 16, 2016. The building's current owners plan to rebuild the restaurant, as it appeared before the fire.

=== Camps, motor courts and motels ===
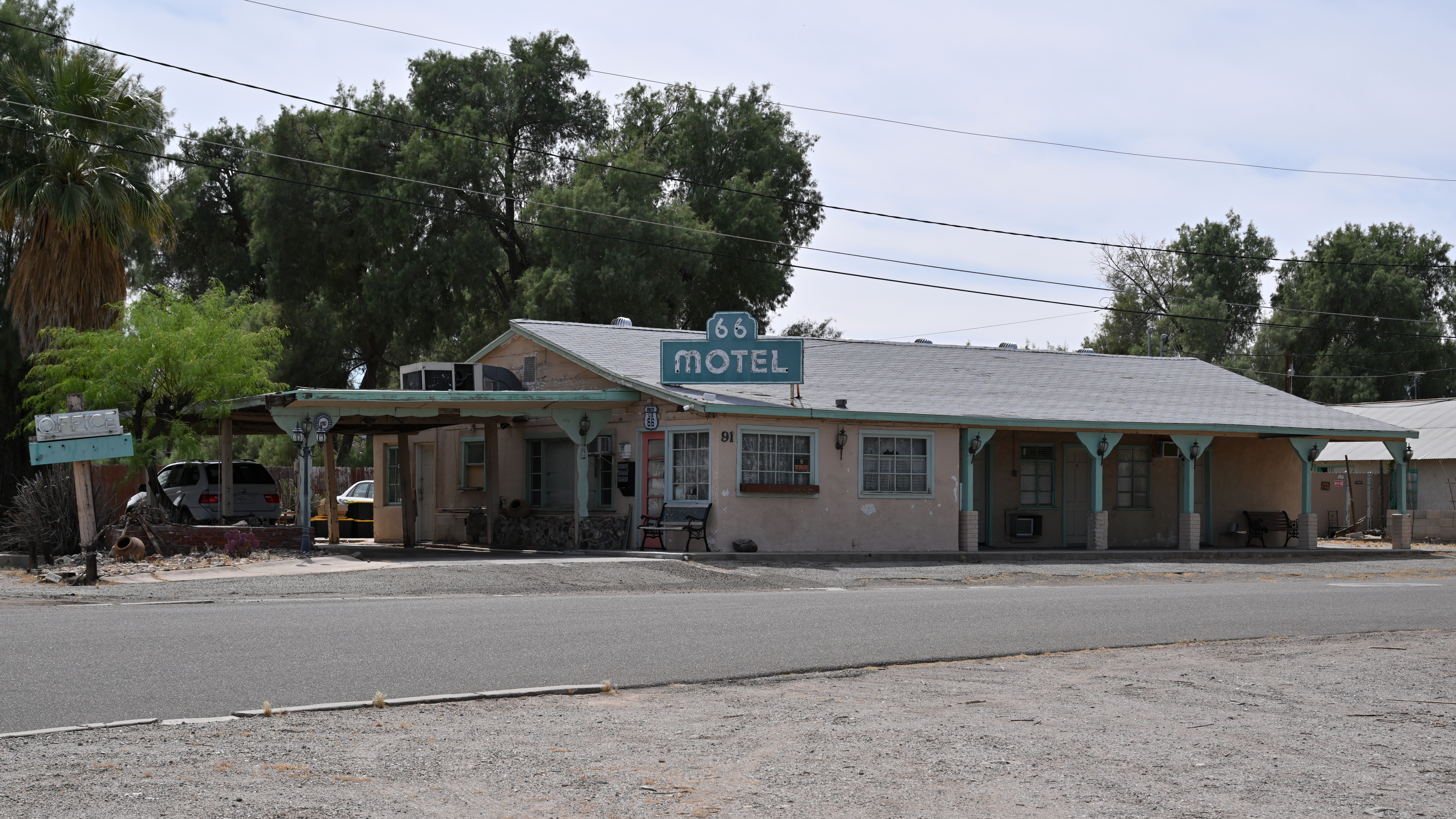
66 Motel, Needles, CA

Route 66 has attracted campers since the Great Depression era, where The Grapes of Wrath describes a large but primitive riverside campground as one of the first sights when arriving in Needles, California from Arizona. Needles later became the site of the Carty's Camp cabins seen briefly in John Ford's 1940 film version of "The Grapes of Wrath" (now a deteriorating ghost tourist court) and the later adjacent 66 Motel (which currently offers long-term rental only).

The 1924 Aztec Hotel in Monrovia, a National Historic Landmark in the San Gabriel Valley, is notable for its Mayan Revival architecture.

One of three restored Wigwam Motels accommodates motorists in San Bernardino near Rialto. Based on a once-patented novelty architecture, these are tourist courts in which each cabin is a free-standing concrete wigwam. This group of motels served as an inspiration for the Cozy Cone Motel in Cars (film).

=== Museums ===
California devotes a pair of museums to the history of old Route 66, the California Route 66 Museum in the former Red Rooster Café in Victorville and the Barstow Route 66 "Mother Road" Museum in the town's former Harvey House Railroad Depot.

=== Bridges ===
The Figueroa Street Tunnels carry the Arroyo Seco Parkway through Elysian Park in Los Angeles; a Four Level Interchange connecting the Hollywood Freeway (Route 101) to Route 66 was the first stack interchange in the world.

The historic 1916 Trails Arch Bridge spanning the Colorado River from Topock, Arizona to Needles, California still stands but is no longer open to traffic as the roadbed has since been removed to carry a natural gas pipeline.

== See also ==
- U.S. Route 80 in California
- List of landmarks on U.S. Route 66

U.S. Route 66
Previous state: Terminus	California	Next state: Arizona

National Old Trails Road
Previous state: Terminus	California	Next state: Arizona
