= Eastbridge, Arizona =

Former railroad station on the Colorado River in Mohave County, Arizona, US

Coordinates: 34.8176°N 114.5758°W

Eastbridge was a railroad station on the east bank of the Colorado River in Mohave County, Arizona, United States. It was located at the site of the first bridge the Atlantic and Pacific Railroad built across that river, three miles southeast of Needles, in San Bernardino County, California.

== History ==
The wooden bridge across the Colorado River constructed between Eastbridge station and the California bank in 1883 was built across the wet alluvial soils of the flood plain of the Mohave Valley. The site had no solid base on either bank and was over 1600 feet wide. The construction was conducted during the flood season of the Colorado that began in May. For three months, the building crews struggled to drive wooden pilings into the river bed only to see them washed out by the river. Pilings were only driven into the mid river section with the help of a pile driver mounted on Barge No. 3, towed and held in position by the Mohave II. This first bridge, when completed in August was still vulnerable to flooding and was washed out or undermined by the spring flooding of the river and had to be replaced in 1884, 1886 and 1888. Finally the railroad changed its route southward along the California bank, to Beal, then to a place opposite Mellen, where from 1889 to May 1890 they built the Red Rock Bridge, a cantilever bridge, on rock foundations, unlike the previous site. After completion of the bridge, the section of track between the point where the line changed direction to the new bridge, to the station of Powell and to the bridge and station at Eastbridge, was abandoned in 1890.
