= California State Route 66 =

State highway in California

State Route 66
- Part of Historic U.S. Route 66
- SR 66 highlighted in red; the gap represents the relinquished portion

Route information
- Maintained by Caltrans and local jurisdictions
- Length: 8.94 mi (14.39 km) Portions of SR 66 have been relinquished to or are otherwise maintained by local or other governments, and are not included in the length.
- Existed: 1974–present

Major junctions
- West end: SR 210 in La Verne
- SR 83 in Upland; I-15 in Rancho Cucamonga
- East end: I-215 in San Bernardino

Location
- Country: United States
- State: California
- Counties: Los Angeles, San Bernardino

Highway system
- State highways in California; Interstate; US; State; Scenic; History; Pre‑1964; Unconstructed; Deleted; Freeways
← US 66	→ SR 67

State Route 66 (SR 66) is a state highway in the U.S. state of California that runs along a section of former U.S. Route 66 (US 66) in Los Angeles and San Bernardino counties. It goes from SR 210 in La Verne east to Interstate 215 (I-215) in San Bernardino. The route primarily runs along Foothill Boulevard before becoming part of Fifth Street in San Bernardino. Though some maps and signs may still mark SR 66 as continuous through the cities of Claremont, Upland, Rancho Cucamonga, and Fontana, control of segments within those cities were relinquished to those local jurisdictions and are thus no longer officially part of the state highway system.

== Route description ==
Route 66 is defined in section 366, subdivision (a), of the California Streets and Highways Code:

Route 66 is from:
(1) Route 210 near San Dimas to the eastern city limit of the City of Pomona.
(2) The eastern city limit of the City of Rialto to Route 215 in San Bernardino.

While control of the former portions of Route 66 have been relinquished by the state to the cities of Claremont, Fontana, Rancho Cucamonga, Rialto, and Upland, subdivision (b) further mandates that those cities must still "maintain within their respective jurisdictions signs directing motorists to the continuation of Route 66".

SR 66 begins as Foothill Boulevard at the interchange with SR 210 in the city of La Verne. SR 66 heads southeast for a few miles before entering Pomona and turning due east. The highway continues into the city of Claremont, passing by Claremont Colleges, before crossing into Upland, San Bernardino County.

In Upland, SR 66 passes by Cable Airport to the south, continuing due east. The highway intersects SR 83 before entering Rancho Cucamonga, where state maintenance of SR 66 currently ends. Foothill Boulevard continues east through Rancho Cucamonga through an interchange with I-15 before entering Fontana, and passing well north of the California Speedway. Foothill Boulevard continues east into Rialto, where the SR 66 designation resumes. SR 66 continues east into San Bernardino, before curving to the north as 5th Street and terminating at I-215 south of downtown.

California's legislature has relinquished state control of the segment from the Pomona–Claremont line east to the Fontana–Rialto line, and turned it over to local control.

SR 66 is part of the California Freeway and Expressway System, although it is neither a freeway nor an expressway. SR 66 is part of the National Highway System, a network of highways that are considered essential to the country's economy, defense, and mobility by the Federal Highway Administration.

== History ==
As a state route, SR 66 was added to the state highway system in the 1964 state highway renumbering, from SR 30 around San Dimas to San Bernardino. By 2013, the portion from east of Pomona to the eastern boundary of Rialto had been relinquished to the various cities that the route passed through.

== Major intersections ==
Except where prefixed with a letter, postmiles were measured on the road as it was in 1964, based on the alignment that existed at the time, and do not necessarily reflect current mileage. Postmile prefixes include: R reflecting a realignment in the route since then, M indicating a second realignment, L referring to an overlap due to a correction or change, and T indicating postmiles classified as temporary. Segments that remain unconstructed or have been relinquished to local control may be omitted. The numbers reset at county lines; the start and end postmiles in each county are given in the county column.

County	Location	Postmile	Destinations	Notes
Los Angeles; LA R0.19-5.34	La Verne	R0.19	Foothill Boulevard	Continuation beyond SR 210; former US 66 west
Los Angeles; LA R0.19-5.34	La Verne	R0.19	SR 210 (Foothill Freeway) – Pasadena, San Bernardino	Interchange; west end of SR 66; future I-210; SR 210 exit 47
Los Angeles; LA R0.19-5.34	La Verne	1.73	Fruit Street, White Avenue	
Los Angeles; LA R0.19-5.34	Pomona	2.54	Garey Avenue	
Los Angeles; LA R0.19-5.34	Pomona–Claremont line	3.22	Towne Avenue to I-10 / SR 210	Eastern end of state maintenance
Los Angeles; LA R0.19-5.34	Claremont	4.16	Indian Hill Boulevard	
San Bernardino; SBD 0.00-23.05	Upland	0.58	Central Avenue	
San Bernardino; SBD 0.00-23.05	Upland	1.69	Mountain Avenue	
San Bernardino; SBD 0.00-23.05	Upland	2.78	SR 83 (Euclid Avenue) to I-10	
San Bernardino; SBD 0.00-23.05	Rancho Cucamonga	4.08	Grove Avenue	
San Bernardino; SBD 0.00-23.05	Rancho Cucamonga	6.15	Archibald Avenue	
San Bernardino; SBD 0.00-23.05	Rancho Cucamonga	7.33	Haven Avenue	
San Bernardino; SBD 0.00-23.05	Rancho Cucamonga	9.80	I-15 (Ontario Freeway)	Interchange; I-15 exit 112
San Bernardino; SBD 0.00-23.05	Rancho Cucamonga	10.33	Etiwanda Avenue	
San Bernardino; SBD 0.00-23.05	Fontana	12.33	Cherry Avenue	
San Bernardino; SBD 0.00-23.05	Fontana	14.36	Citrus Avenue	
San Bernardino; SBD 0.00-23.05	Fontana	15.37	Sierra Avenue	
San Bernardino; SBD 0.00-23.05	Fontana	16.39	Alder Avenue	
San Bernardino; SBD 0.00-23.05	Fontana– Rialto line	17.14	Western end of state maintenance	
San Bernardino; SBD 0.00-23.05	Rialto	19.13	Riverside Avenue	
San Bernardino; SBD 0.00-23.05	Rialto–San Bernardino line	20.14	Pepper Avenue	
San Bernardino; SBD 0.00-23.05	San Bernardino	22.41	Mount Vernon Avenue	Former US 66 east
San Bernardino; SBD 0.00-23.05	San Bernardino	23.05	I-215 (San Bernardino Freeway) – Riverside, Barstow	Interchange; eastern end of SR 66; former I-15E / US 91 / US 395; I-215 north exit 44A, south exit 44
San Bernardino; SBD 0.00-23.05	San Bernardino	23.05	5th Street - Downtown San Bernardino	Continuation beyond I-215
1.000 mi = 1.609 km; 1.000 km = 0.621 mi
