= 66 Motel (Needles) =

Former Motel on Route 66 in Needles, California

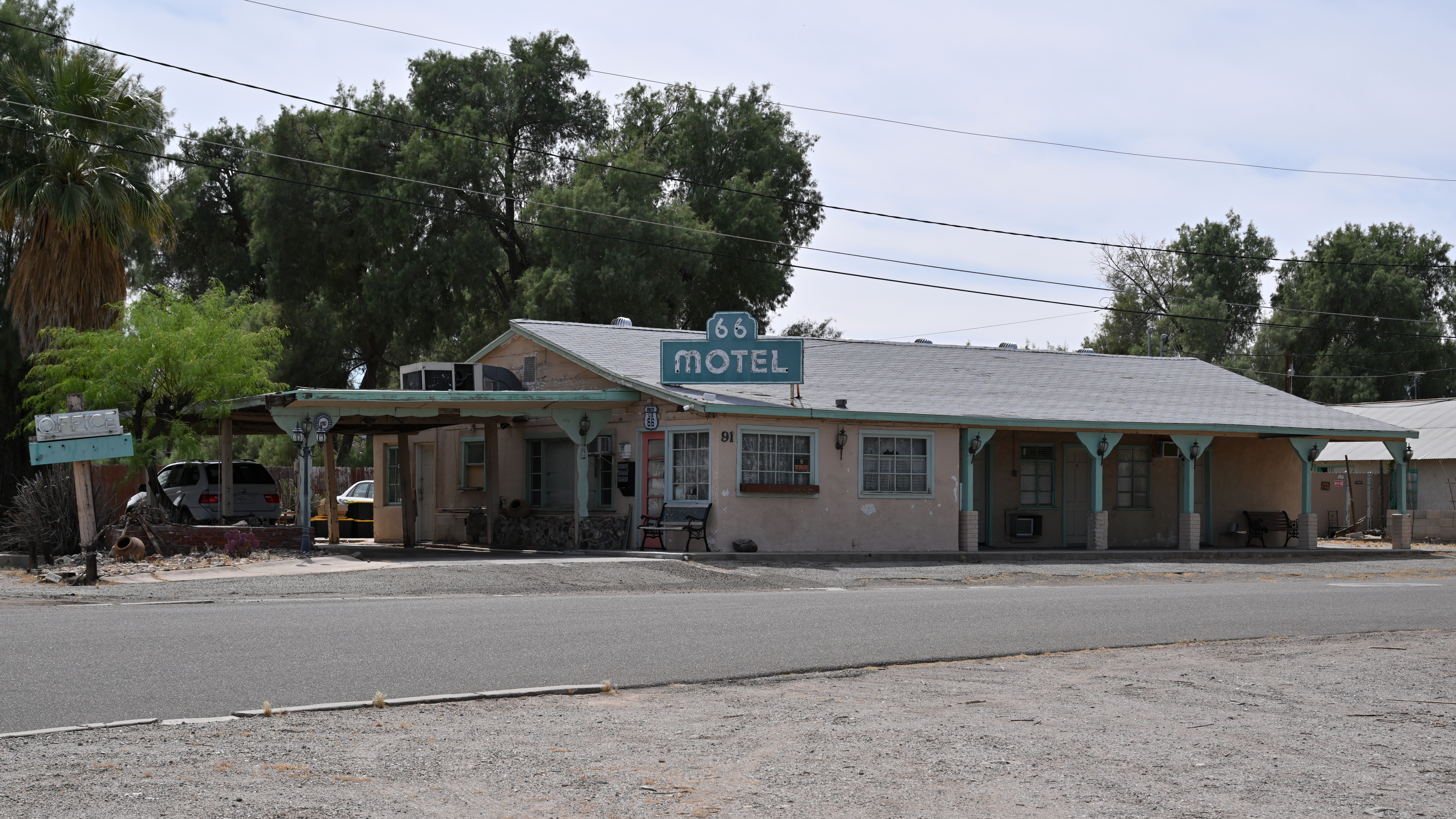
- 66 Motel in Needles CA, USA

- Location in California 66 Motel (Needles) (the United States)

General information
- Location: Needles, California, Desnok & East Broadway St.
- Coordinates: 34.8335°N 114.5959°W
- Opening: 1946–47

Technical details
- Floor count: 1

Other information
- Number of rooms: 6
- Number of restaurants: none
- Parking: on-site

66 Motel, an independently owned six-room motel established 1946–47 in Needles, California, formerly served travelers on U.S. Route 66 in California. Bypassed circa 1970 by Interstate 40, the motel has been used as single room occupancy apartments since the 1990s.

The independent motel is one of numerous U.S. Route 66 businesses which took the name of the now-historic highway in its heyday; there is also a 66 Drive-In cinema in Carthage, Missouri and a Route 66 Motel in Kingman, Arizona.

== History ==
Needles, California, founded in 1883 was originally a stop on the Santa Fe Railway where it crossed from California into Arizona at the eastern edge of the Mojave Desert. Its first significant hotel, the El Garces Intermodal Transportation Facility, was built in 1908 to replace the original railway station. In 1916, the Trails Arch Bridge brought the National Old Trails Road across the Colorado River; this span became part of U.S. Route 66 in 1926.

Campgrounds and cabins, initially primitive in design, sprang up at roadside during the 1920s and 1930s to accommodate motorcar traffic. Needles was significant as the first stop in California for automobile travelers.

The road runs parallel to the river, and it was well into the morning when the burning motors came to Needles, where the river runs swiftly among the reeds.
The Joads and Wilsons drove to the river, and they sat in the cars looking at the lovely water flowing by and the green reeds jerking slowly in the current. There was a little encampment by the river, eleven tents near the water, and the swamp grass on the ground. And Tom leaned out of the truck window. "Mind if we stop here a piece?"

— John Steinbeck, The Grapes of Wrath

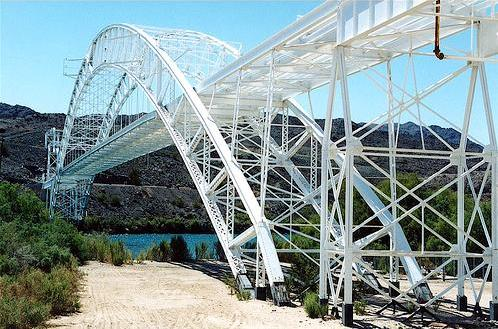
1916 Trails Arch Bridge spanning the Colorado River

In the 1940 film The Grapes of Wrath, the first sights on entering California were signs for the town of Needles and for "Carty's Camp", a group of tourist cabins (now abandoned and in disrepair) with a filling station. After World War II, increased prosperity meant that travellers who once camped as "tin-can tourists" were now staying in a growing number of roadside motels along the highway. Road travel would replace rail travel for an increasing number of passengers in the 1950s.

66 Motel, built soon after the war, was constructed (1946–47) in front of the historic Carty's cabin camp. In 1949, the old El Garces railway hotel accommodated its last overnight visitors. In contrast with the older railway hotel, 66 Motel offered convenient proximity to the highway and modern amenities. In its heyday, the 66 Motel (like many other contemporary lodgings) offered air conditioning, TV, and kitchenettes, with neon signage pointing the way.

== Decline ==
The Red Rock Bridge, a former railway bridge, carried Route 66 traffic across the Colorado River from 1946 until the Interstate 40 crossing was built two decades later. I-40 bypassed Needles c. 1970 and the long-abandoned Red Rock Bridge was dismantled in 1976, leaving I-40 as the only viable highway crossing eastward into Arizona. An 11-mile stretch of US 95 through Needles was also pushed out of the town onto I-40 as part of a concurrency.

This left the motel and the Route 66 segment through the village bypassed and no longer part of the main road westward to Los Angeles.

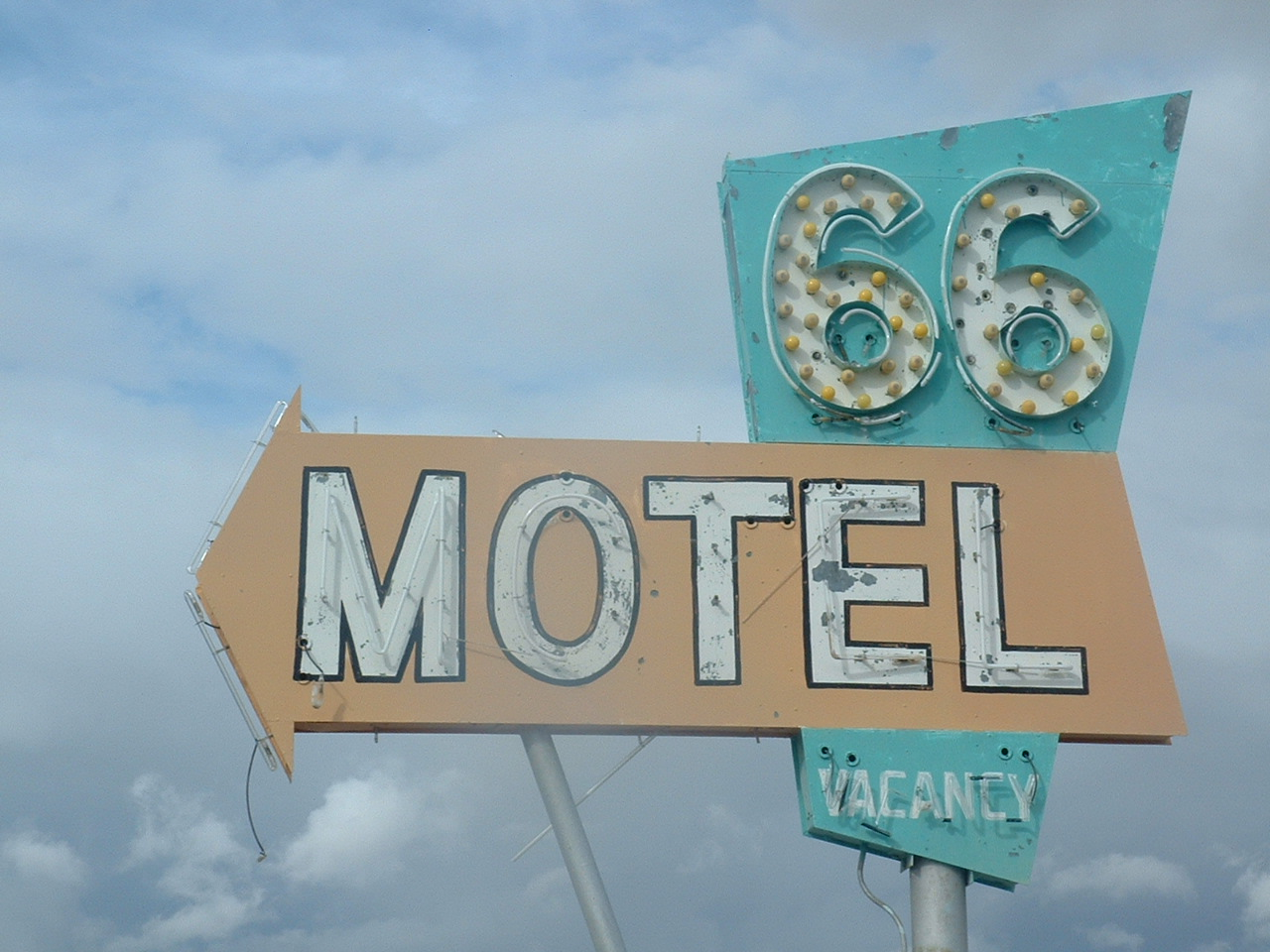
66 Motel neon sign before restoration

Small independent Route 66 lodgings, on the town's now-bypassed main street but a mile or more from the nearest freeway exit, would be forced to compete with national chains building newer, larger properties directly adjacent to the I-40 off-ramps.

"This has been a dead place for a long time, This motel has a lot of potential, but what it boils down to is that Mama-and-Papa businesses in this country are dead, dead, dead. You need big business to do anything. All I want to do is get out of here."

— Marjud Paakkanen, 66 Motel's owner, in 1997

As the small, independent motels relied on the visibility which came with a location on the main road of their era, business declined. By the 1990s, the 66 Motel was no longer taking overnight travellers and its much-photographed neon signage was deteriorating and no longer functional. The motel survived through monthly rentals as single room occupancy.

== Preservation ==
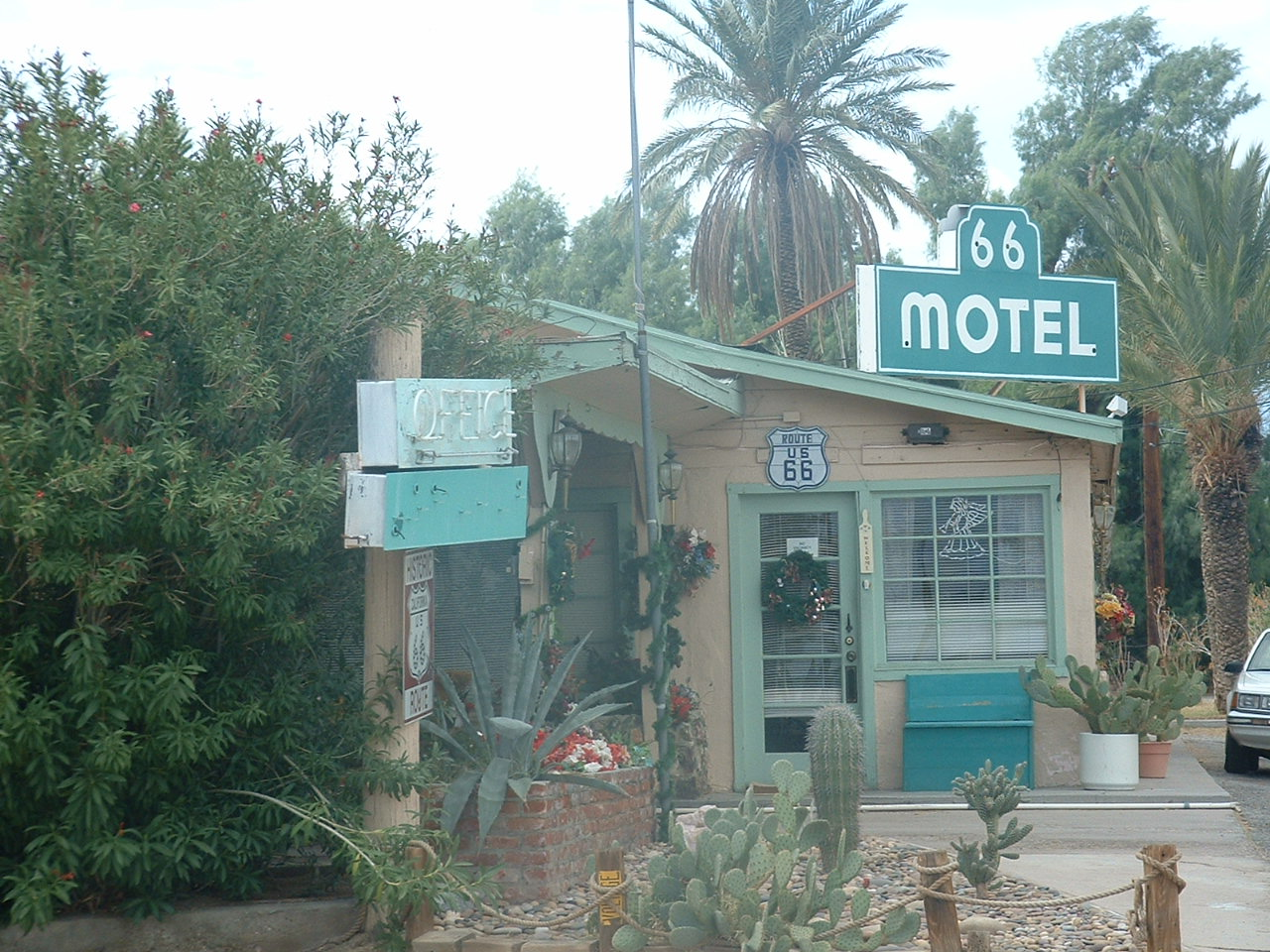
Entrance to the 66 Motel

In 2012, a private fundraising effort led by Ed Klein of Route 66 World raised almost three thousand dollars ($3000) toward the repair of the historic motel's neon signage; the green 66 and red MOTEL flickered back to life as part of a re-lighting ceremony on the evening of June 23, 2012. Klein has plans to revisit the motel sign in the first half of 2021 to give it a touch up of paint and to check the neon's electrical system.

As of July, 2024, the motel was listed for sale on Zillow for $199,000. It boasts a lobby, a manager's apartment as well as six motel rooms. Included in the sale is the historic "66 Motel" sign and the lot across the street.

== See also ==
- List of motels
