= Foothill Boulevard (Southern California) =

Major road in the city and county of Los Angeles

- Part of: SR 66 between the SR 210 in La Verne and 5th Street in San Bernardino
- Namesake: The foothills of the San Gabriel and San Bernardino Mountains
- Maintained by: Caltrans and local jurisdictions
- Tourist routes: Historic US 66
- Location: Los Angeles and San Bernardino counties, California, United States
- West end: I-5 / SR 14 in Newhall Pass
- Major junctions: I-210 in Los Angeles; I-210 in La Cañada Flintridge; Oak Grove Drive at the La Cañada Flintridge–Pasadena line; Walnut Street / Greenwood Avenue in Pasadena; I-210 / SR 19 at the Pasadena–East Pasadena–Arcadia tripoint; Mountain Avenue / Deodar Lane in Monrovia; Huntington Drive at the Azusa–Irwindale line; SR 39 in Azusa; Citrus Avenue at the Azusa–Glendora line; Amelia Avenue at the Glendora–San Dimas line; SR 210 in La Verne; SR 83 in Upland; I-15 in Rancho Cucamonga
- East end: 5th Street in San Bernardino

Foothill Boulevard is a major street in the city and county of Los Angeles, as well as an arterial road in the city and county of San Bernardino, stretching well over 60 miles (97 km) in length, with some notable breaks along the route. Like its name implies, Foothill Boulevard runs across the foothills of the San Gabriel and San Bernardino Mountains.

For much of its length, Foothill Boulevard is the historic Route 66, so many diners and other establishments along the road have been refurbished in a 1950s style, or otherwise trade on the association with Route 66. Segment of Foothill Boulevard are also designated as the aptly numbered State Route 66.

== Route description ==
=== Newhall Pass to La Cañada Flintridge ===
Foothill Boulevard starts off in Newhall Pass in the Sylmar district of the city of Los Angeles at Sierra Highway near the southern terminus of State Route 14. Foothill Boulevard is a two-lane road through Newhall Pass, paralleling Interstate 5 (I-5) truck lanes until its intersection with Balboa Boulevard, where it becomes a four-lane road for the remainder of its length. At the I-5/I-210 interchange, Foothill Boulevard heads southeast parallel to the Foothill Freeway, bypassing the city of San Fernando, entering Lake View Terrace south of the I-210/SR 118 interchange. SR 118 formerly ran along Foothill Boulevard from the I-210/SR 118 interchange until Pasadena. In 1974, the current alignment of Interstate 210 was completed, and the only remaining portion of the Foothill Boulevard was the unsigned freeway over the Arroyo Seco in Pasadena.

Foothill Boulevard leaves the San Fernando Valley, passing through the Sunland and Tujunga neighborhoods in the northwestern Crescenta Valley. It then enters the Crescenta Highlands neighborhood of Glendale and serves as a main street in the north Glendale area. Then it enters the unincorporated area of La Crescenta-Montrose, California, and it serves as the main street through the valley. Upon crossing the Verdugo Wash, it enters the city of La Cañada Flintridge. In La Cañada Flintridge, it has junctions with Ocean View Boulevard, Chevy Chase Drive, and Gould Avenue. After Gould Avenue it has an interchange with I-210 and ends at the Oak Grove Drive at the La Cañada Flintridge–Pasadena line.

The traversable route between the Newhall Pass–La Cañada Flintridge and Pasadena–Monrovia segments is along Oak Grove Drive, Woodbury Road, Fair Oaks Avenue, and Walnut Street in Pasadena.

=== Pasadena to Monrovia ===
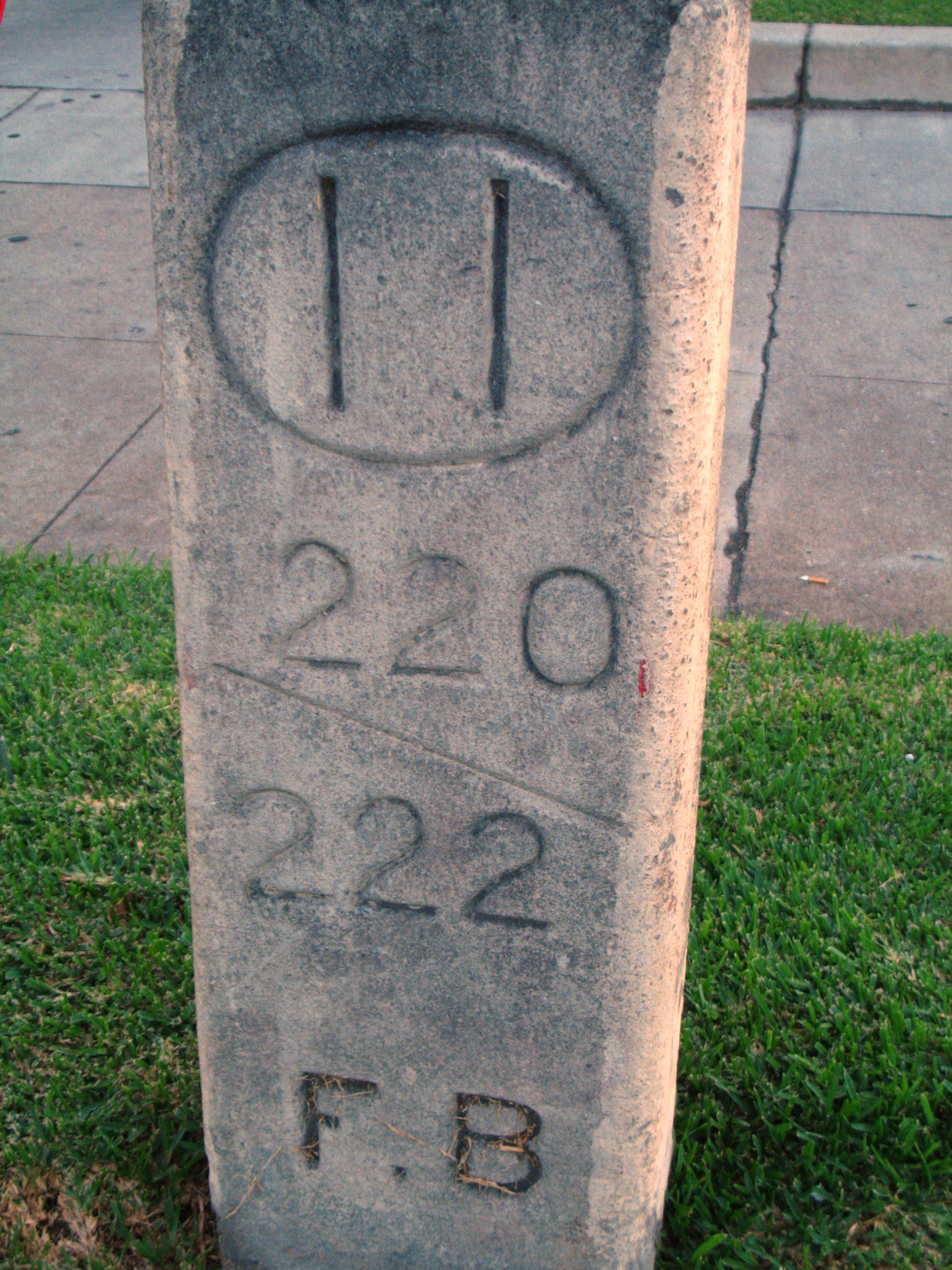
Foothill Boulevard Milestone in Pasadena

Foothill Boulevard resumes in Pasadena at its intersection with Walnut Street and Greenwood Avenue. It then has an intersection with Craig Avenue. It passes through Lamanda Park, where it has intersections with Sierra Madre Boulevard, Altadena Drive, and San Gabriel Boulevard. It has direct freeway ramps to or from I-210 west at Rosemead Boulevard (SR 19), Quigley Avenue, and Michillinda Avenue at the line at the Pasadena–East Pasadena–Arcadia tripoint; and Baldwin Avenue in Arcadia. In Arcadia, the street has an intersection with Santa Anita Avenue before entering Monrovia. In Monrovia, it has intersections with Mayflower Avenue, Myrtle Avenue, and California Avenue, before meeting its eastern terminus at the intersection of Mountain Avenue and Deodar Lane. The segment of Foothill Boulevard between Santa Anita Avenue in Arcadia to Shamrock Avenue in Monrovia follows the 1926–1940 alignment of U.S. Route 66 (US 66).

The traversable route between the Pasadena–Monrovia and Irwindale–Azusa segments is along Mountain Avenue and Huntington Drive in Monrovia, Duarte, and Irwindale.

=== Irwindale and Azusa ===
The Azusa segment of Foothill Boulevard Begins at Huntington Drive at the San Gabriel River at the Irwindale–Azusa line. The route then curves to the east and then has an intersection with Irwindale Avenue in Irwindale before reentering Azusa. East of Cerritos Avenue, Alosta Avenue forks southeast to follow the Historic US 66 alignment, while Foothill Boulevard meets its eastern terminus at Citrus Avenue at the Azusa–Glendora line.

For the traversable route bridging Foothill Boulevard's third gap, Glendora renamed its segment of Alosta Avenue as "Route 66", explicitly marking the city's portion of the Historic US 66 alignment.

=== San Dimas to San Bernardino ===
The final segment begins at Amelia Avenue on the Glendora–San Dimas line, where Glendora's "Route 66" street designation turns back into Foothill Boulevard. It then has an intersection with San Dimas Avenue, which heads south to an SR 210. Foothill Boulevard the intersects with Walnut Avenue before meeting San Dimas Canyon Road west of the San Dimas–La Verne line.

In La Verne, Foothill Boulevard assumes the designation SR 66 after it intersects with SR 210. SR 66/Foothill Boulevard then heads southeast before entering Pomona and turning due east. The highway continues to Towne Avenue at the Pomona–Claremont line where state maintenance of the western segment of SR 66 officially ends. Foothill Boulevard then passes by Claremont Colleges before crossing into Upland in San Bernardino County.

In Upland, Foothill Boulevard passes by Cable Airport to the south, continuing due east. The highway intersects Euclid Avenue (SR 83) before entering Rancho Cucamonga. Foothill Boulevard continues east into Rialto, where the SR 66 designation resumes.

SR 66/Foothill Boulevard enters San Bernardino at Pepper Avenue. Foothill Boulevard then ends at Nuñez Park, where it splits into 4th Street and 5th Street/SR 66.
