= Luciana Abait =

Argentine artist

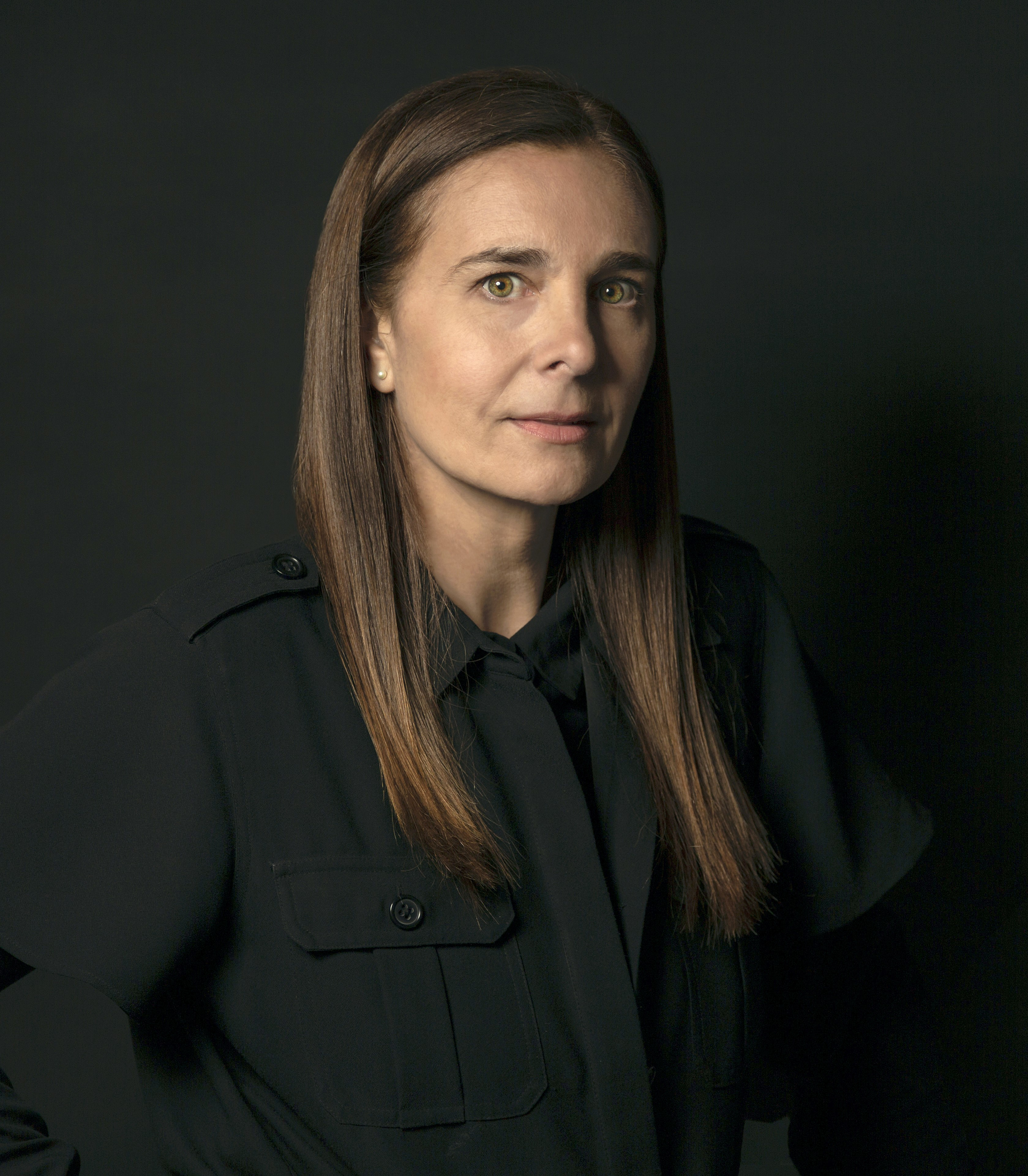
- Born: 1971 (age 54–55); Buenos Aires, Argentina
- Education: National School of the Arts, Buenos Aires
- Website: www.lucianaabait.com

Luciana Abait is an Argentine artist. She was born and raised in Buenos Aires, Argentina, and studied drawing, painting, photography, sculpture, and printmaking at the National School of the Arts in Buenos Aires. Abait immigrated to the United States in 1997. She has exhibited in Europe, Asia, Latin America, the United States, as well as numerous museums and international art fairs. She lives and works in Los Angeles, California, and is a resident artist at the 18th Street Arts Center in Santa Monica.

== Career ==
From 1997 though 2005 Abait lived in Miami, Florida, where she was the artist in residence at Oolite Arts Center (formerly known Art Center South Florida). In 2005, Abait relocated to Los Angeles, California. Abait participated in the first SUR:Beinnial in 2011 that took place at Cerritos College Art Gallery, Bluebird Art House, and Rio Hondo College Art Gallery. In 2019 Luciana exhibited with Los Angeles World Airports where she debuted her exhibition titled A Letter to the Future. A phrase taken from a plaque dedicated to the glacier named Okjokull which also included text inscribed by Icelands most prominent writer Andri Snaer Magnason, "stating that within the next two hundred years all glaciers will follow the same path". Okjokull became known as the first melted glacier due to climate change in 2014. The artist is dedicated to exploring Anthropocene and climate change engages in thorough research, venturing into the most remote locations to meticulously document the state of the environment.

In 2026, Abait was commissioned by the local government of West Hollywood, California for an artwork installation celebrating the Route 66 centennial. The installation, a vinyl mural titled Open Road, spanned 80 feet long along Santa Monic Boulevard and depicted mountainous views of Route 66 in the local area.

=== Selected exhibitions ===
- 2023 - Laguna Art Museum, Laguna Beach, California, Hilliard Art Museum, University of Louisiana Lafayette
- 2022 - Laband Art Gallery, Loyola Marymount University, Los Angeles, California Museum of Thousand Oaks, Thousand Oaks, California, Brand Library, Glendale, California
- 2021 - Culver City Arts Commission, Helms Bakery District Cantabria Museum of Nature, Cantabria, Spain
- 2019 - Cerritos College Art Gallery, Cerritos, California, Los Angeles World Airports, Terminal 7
- 2012 - Lehigh University, Lehigh, Pennsylvania
- 2011 - Rio Hondo College Art Gallery, part of SUR:Biennial
- 2005 - Jean Albano Gallery, Chicago, Illinois
- 2004 - Houston, Texas and Art Chicago
- 2001 - Jean Albano Gallery, Chicago

=== Public collections ===
- Art in Embassies Program, U.S. Department of State
- University of Miami, Bascon Palmer Eye Institute,
- Lehigh University Museum
- Neiman Marcus, Coral Gables, FL
- Neiman Marcus, Palm Beach, FL
- Ritz Carlton, Chicago, IL
- Sprint Corporation, Kansas City, MO
- Swire Properties, Cityplaza, Hong Kong
- White & Case, Miami, FL
- Ambac, New York, NY
- Amoco, Argentina
- Banco Supervielle Societe Generale, Argentina
- Cityplaza, Hong Kong
- Colonial Bank, Miami, FL
- Florida State University, Tallahassee, FL
- Four Seasons Hotel, Miami, FL
- Freshfields, Hong Kong
- King and Spalding, Houston, TX

=== Awards and nominations ===
- 2024-25 LL Stewart Fellowship, Oregon State University, OR
- 2013–2023, Artist in Residence, 18th Street Arts Center, Santa Monica, California
- 2022 ArtNight Mini-Grant, City of Pasadena, California
- 2021, Art Lives Here, Geffen Playhouse, Los Angeles, California
- Projecting Possibilities Grant, Culver City Arts Foundation, Culver City, California
- Quick Grant, Center for Cultural Innovation, San Francisco, California 2020 Shares, Grant for Limited Edition, Oolite Arts, Miami, FL
- Quick Grant, Center for Cultural Innovation, San Francisco, California
- 2016, Santa Monica Individual Artist Fellowship Award
- 1999–2005, Artist in Residence Oolite Art Center (formerly Art Center South Florida) Miami, Florida
- 2015, Santa Monica Individual Artist Fellowship - Year 2016
- 2005, ArtBank, Purchase Award/Grant, Miami- Dade Art in Public Places, Miami, FL 2000 Florida Individual Artist Fellowship Program, Honorable Mention, Tallahassee, FL
