= Foothill Boulevard Milestone =

Milestone in Pasadena, California

- Foothill Boulevard Milestone (Mile 11)
- U.S. National Register of Historic Places
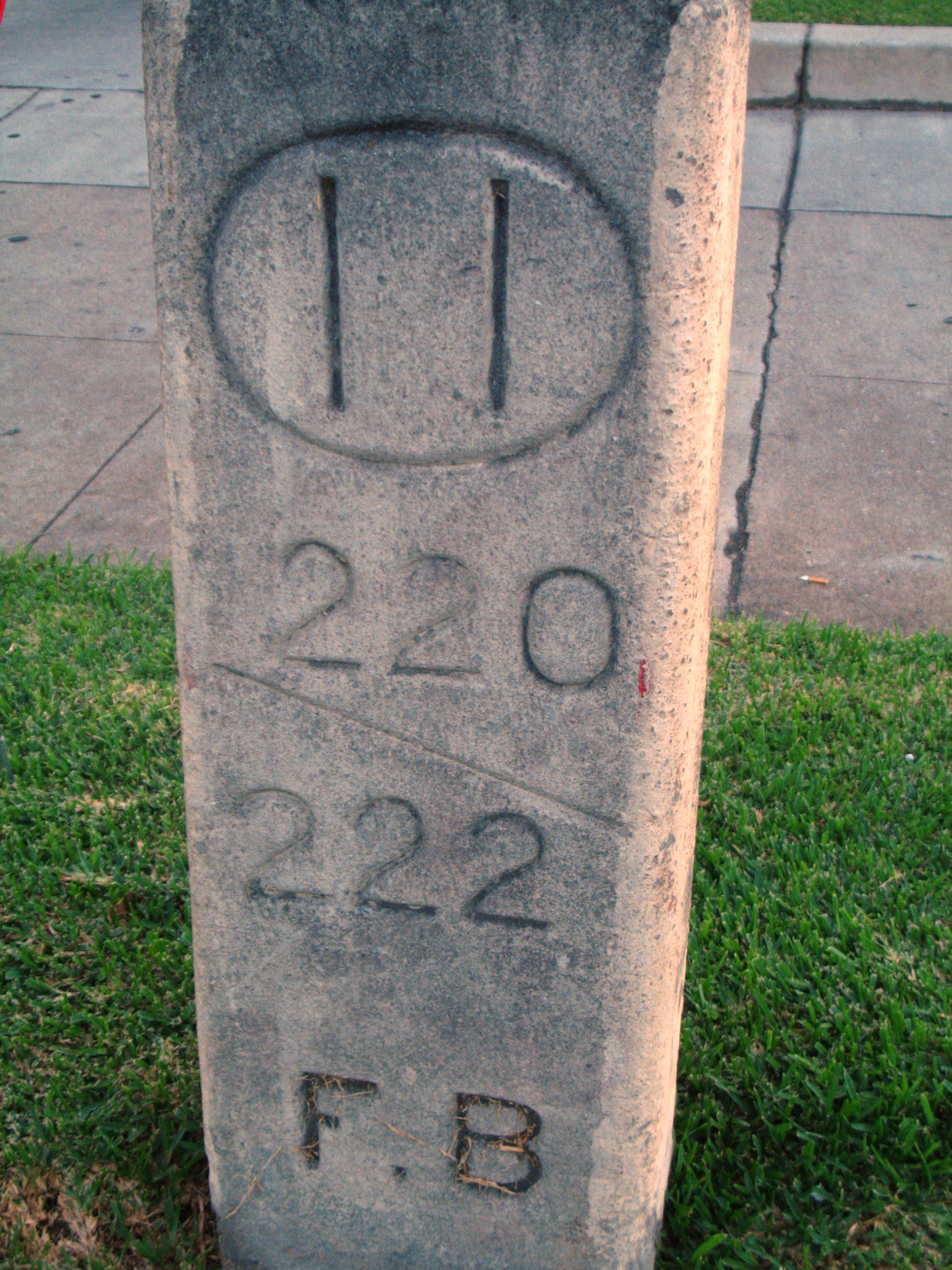

- Location within the Los Angeles metropolitan area Location within California Location within the United States
- Location: S side of E. Colorado Blvd., W of jct. with Holliston Ave., Pasadena, California
- Coordinates: 34°8′45″N 118°7′23″W
- Area: less than 1 acre (0.4 ha)
- Architectural style: Road Marker
- MPS: Early Automobile-Related Properties in Pasadena MPS
- NRHP reference No.: 96000421
- Added to NRHP: April 19, 1996

The Foothill Boulevard Milestone, also known as the Foothill Boulevard Milestone (Mile 11) or the Bancroft Marker, is a historical milestone located on Colorado Boulevard west of Holliston Street in Pasadena, California. It marks the 11th mile of the Foothill Boulevard highway that existed in the 1900s.

== Background ==
The milestone was placed along the Foothill Boulevard, one of six highways established and marked by the Highway Commission of Los Angeles County in the 1900s. Foothill Boulevard began in Los Angeles and passed through South Pasadena and Pasadena before turning east and running through the cities in the foothills of the San Gabriel Mountains. The milestone marked the point 11 miles (18 km) from the Los Angeles County Courthouse in Los Angeles. In addition, the milestone marked the block number of the highway; each highway was marked using a block system that divided every mile of the road into ten blocks. After the Highway Commission disbanded in 1908, its highway system was largely forgotten. The Mile 11 marker is the only remaining milestone of the three placed by the commission in Pasadena.

The milestone was added to the National Register of Historic Places on April 19, 1996.

== Gallery ==
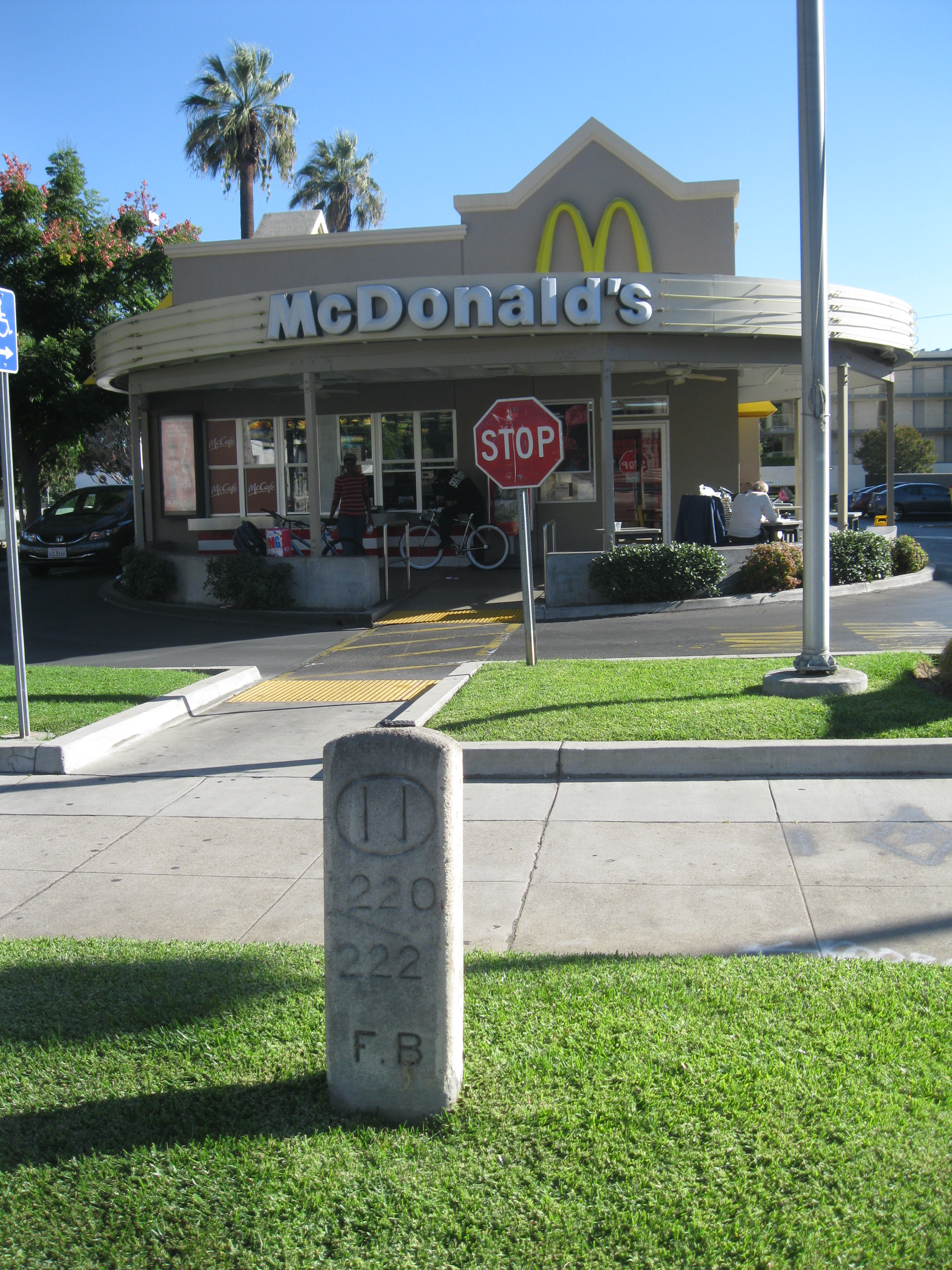
The milestone in its modern setting
