= Beal, California =

US railroad station

Coordinates: 34.7578°N 114.5503°W

Beal was a railroad station on the Atlantic and Pacific Railroad line between Needles, California and Topock, Arizona from 1889. It was located 5 miles north on the railroad line to Needles from Mellen.

== History ==
The bridge across the Colorado River constructed at Eastbridge station in 1883 was washed out or undermined by the spring flooding of the river in 1884, 1886 and 1888. The railroad route was moved southward to Beal, then to Mellen where from 1889 to May 1890 the Red Rock Bridge was built. Unlike the previous bridge, this one was a cantilever bridge built on stone foundations. The section of track between where the line changed direction to the new bridge, to the station of Powell and the bridge and station at Eastbridge, was abandoned in 1890.

== Current status ==
As of 2021, the site of Beal is abandoned, with no visible ruins.
