= Old Trails Bridge =

Bridge over the Colorado River, US

- U.S. National Register of Historic Places
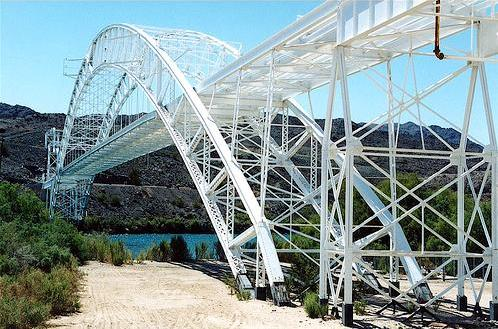
- Old Trails Bridge in September 2002

- Location within Arizona Location within the United States Location within California Location within the United States
- Location: Abandoned US 66 over the Colorado River, south of Topock, Arizona; United States
- Coordinates: 34°42′57″N 114°29′5″W
- Area: 0.3 acres (0.12 ha)
- Built: 1915-16
- Built by: Sourwine, S.A.; Et al.
- Architectural style: Brace-ribbed through arch
- MPS: Vehicular Bridges in Arizona MPS
- NRHP reference No.: 88001676
- Added to NRHP: September 30, 1988

The Old Trails Bridge is a historic bridge over the Colorado River in San Bernardino County, California and Mohave County, Arizona in the United States, that is listed on the National Register of Historic Places (NRHP). It has also been known as Topock Bridge and as Needles Bridge.

== Description and history ==
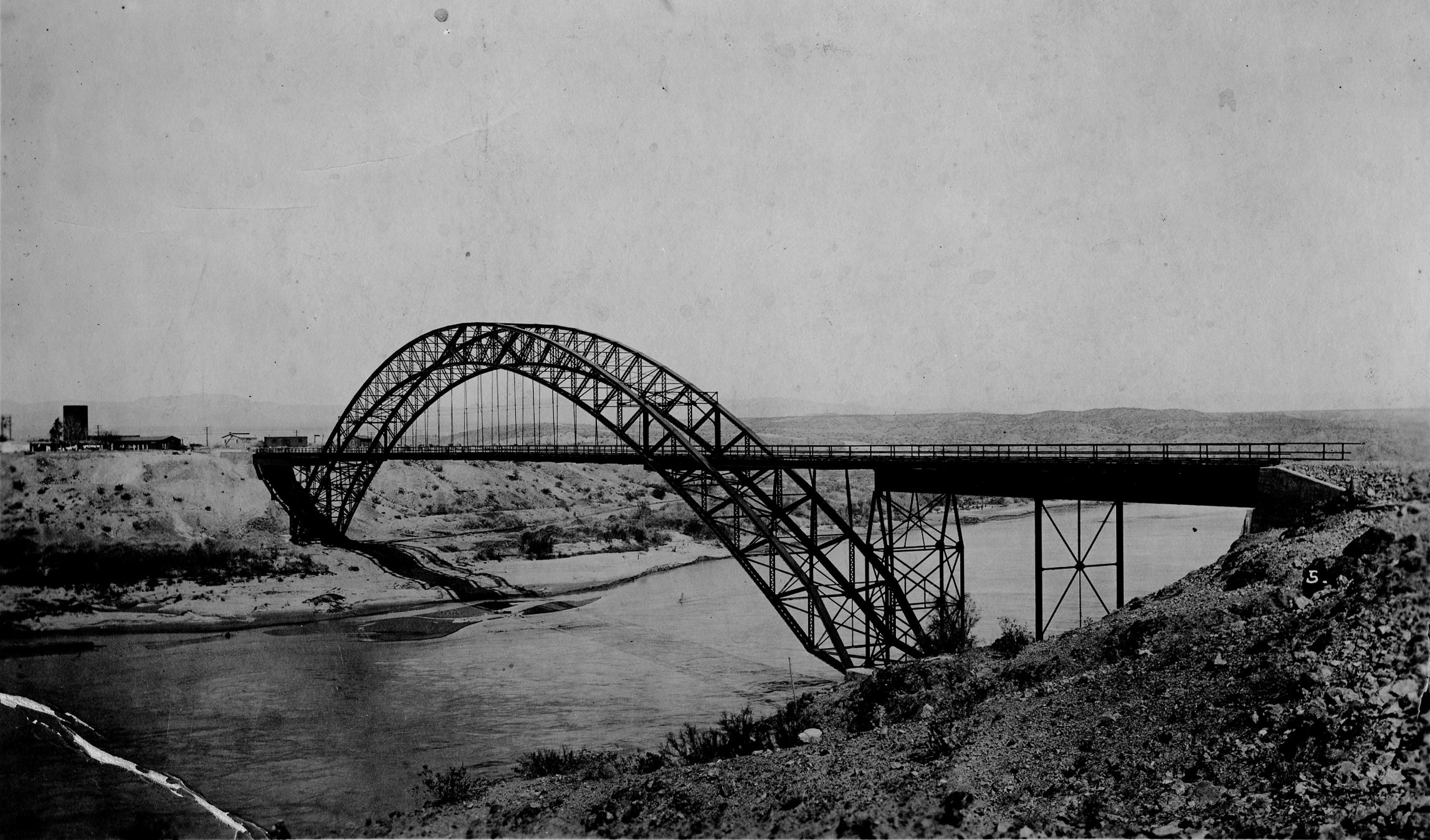
View of the Old Trails Bridge in the 1920s, from Arizona

The bridge carried a now-abandoned section of the former U.S. Route 66 across from southeast of Needles, California to south of Topock, Arizona. It is a brace-ribbed through arch bridge that was built in 1915–1916. It served as a highway bridge until 1947 when the Red Rock Bridge, formerly a railroad bridge, was modified for highway use. The Old Trails Bridge was later converted to a pipeline bridge.

It was listed on the NRHP on September 30, 1988.

The bridge has been seen in a number of blockbuster films including The Grapes of Wrath and Easy Rider.

== See also ==
- National Register of Historic Places listings in Mohave County, Arizona
- National Register of Historic Places listings in San Bernardino County, California
