= Cable Airport =

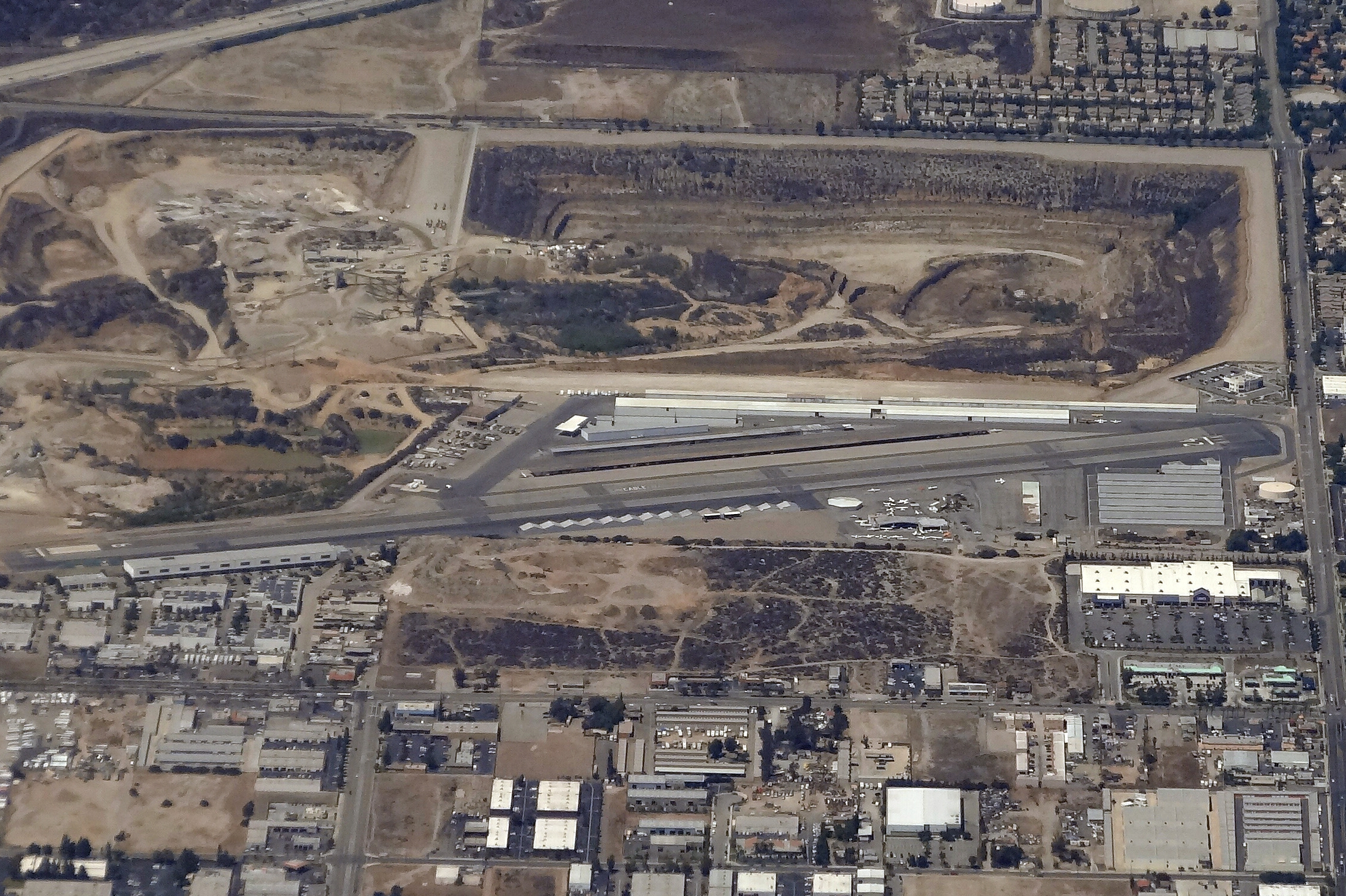
- IATA: CCB; ICAO: KCCB; FAA LID: CCB

Summary
- Airport type: Public
- Owner: Cable Land Co.
- Location: Upland, California
- Elevation AMSL: 1,444 ft (440 m)
- Coordinates: 34°06′42″N 117°41′15″W
- Website: www.cableairport.com
- Interactive map of Cable Airport

Runways
Direction	Length		Surface
Direction	ft	m	Surface
6/24	3,864	1,178	Asphalt

Helipads
Number	Length		Surface
Number	ft	m	Surface
H1	65	20	Asphalt
H2	65	20	Asphalt/concrete

Statistics (2016)
- Aircraft operations: 92,189
- Based aircraft: 227
- Source: Federal Aviation Administration

Cable Airport (IATA: CCB, ICAO: KCCB, FAA LID: CCB) is a non-towered public-use airport located two miles (3 km) northwest of the central business district of Upland, a city in San Bernardino County, California, United States. It is privately owned by the Cable Land Company.

== History ==
Cable-Claremont Airport (as it was known until 1961) was founded in 1945 by Maude and Dewey Cable, who bought the land for $8,500. This is equivalent to $152,010 in 2025. The Cables divided the land, selling the northern portion for what the entire parcel had cost them. That parcel was developed into a quarry by Holliday Rock, which recently erected its national headquarters near the approach end of Runway 24. The first runway, 1-19, built by Dewey Cable himself, was 1,500 feet (460 m) long. It ran north–south, perpendicular to the prevailing winds, and had a steep gradient. The main runway, 6-24, was completed six months later. Unlike the first runway, it ran east–west (parallel to the wind, which is ideal), had a hard, flat surface, and by 1947 was 2,350 feet (720 m) long and 150 feet (46 m) wide.

Cable Commuter Airlines was a commuter air carrier operating de Havilland Canada DHC-6 Twin Otter STOL capable turboprop aircraft that was initially based at the airport. In 1968, Cable Commuter Airlines was operating a hub at the Los Angeles International Airport (LAX) with flights to such southern California destinations as Burbank, Colton, Inyokern, Ontario, Oxnard, Palmdale, Palm Springs, Santa Ana (Orange County Airport), Santa Barbara and Santa Maria as well as to Lake Havasu City in Arizona. Cable Commuter was acquired by Golden West Airlines, another southern California based commuter air carrier.

== Today ==
KCCB is a Class G (untowered) airport. Runway 1-19 is no longer in existence. In its place are some hangars, a fuel island, and a covered, lighted wash rack. Runway 6-24, now lengthened to 3,865 feet (1,178 m), has been resurfaced and is mostly flat, with some undulations on the east half.

There is a terminal building with an FBO (flight school and rentals), aircraft repair shop, Maniac Mike's restaurant, and a control tower which is used to marshal aircraft during the annual Cable Air Show in January. (The tower is not normally used at any other time, as Cable is an uncontrolled airport.)

This airport is also home to the Civil Air Patrol Squadron 25. Cable Airport is still owned by the Cable family. Based on number of aircraft based at the field (450), it ranks as the largest privately owned airport in the world.

== Facilities and aircraft ==
Cable Airport covers an area of 95 acres (38 ha) which contains one runway (6/24) measuring 3,864 ft × 75 ft (1,178 m × 23 m) and two helipads, each measuring 65 ft × 65 ft (20 m × 20 m).

For the 12-month period ending August 31, 2016, the airport had 92,189 general aviation aircraft operations, an average of 252 per day. There were 227 aircraft based at this airport: 94% single-engine, <1% multi-engine, <1% helicopter, <1% glider and <1% ultralight.

== Accidents and incidents ==
- June 24, 2006: A Cessna 560 Citation Encore operated by Aero Charter Services en route from San Diego to Cable Airport approached runway 24 around 10:00 pm, overran the runway. and came to rest about 850 feet beyond the runway threshold. The accident left one dead and two seriously injured.
- May 6, 2016: After an unsuccessful attempt to restart their engines and approaching San Bernardino, an Antonov An-2R en route from Cable Airport to San Bernardino made a forced landing in a residential area which left none injured. According to the subsequent investigation, the lower gascolator and the fine fuel filter were filled partially with water, which led to engine failure.
- September 17, 2018: A Piper PA-24 Comanche en route from Reno, Nevada to Cable Airport landed short of the runway and left two uninjured. The incident was reportedly caused by engine failure.
- January 3, 2022: A Cessna 120 crashed during a go-around attempt after encountering the wake turbulence of a low-flying helicopter operating at the airport. The aircraft entered an uncommanded right bank and impacted the surface of the airport upside down. The sole pilot on board survived with minor injuries.
- July 30, 2023: A single-engine Beechcraft P35 carrying three passengers and with a full fuel tank was in the midst of taking off, when it began to bank right. The aircraft then struck a hangar at the far southwest end of the runway. The plane immediately burst into flame and the three occupants were killed.
- March 11, 2026 Cessna T210L Turbo Centurion overran runway 24 after landing. It struck a soil based embankment past the end of the runway and overturned. Damage to the aircraft was described as "minor" and both occupants, a pilot and passenger, only suffered minor injuries.
