= Topock, Arizona =

Unincorporated community in Arizona, United States

- Census-designated place
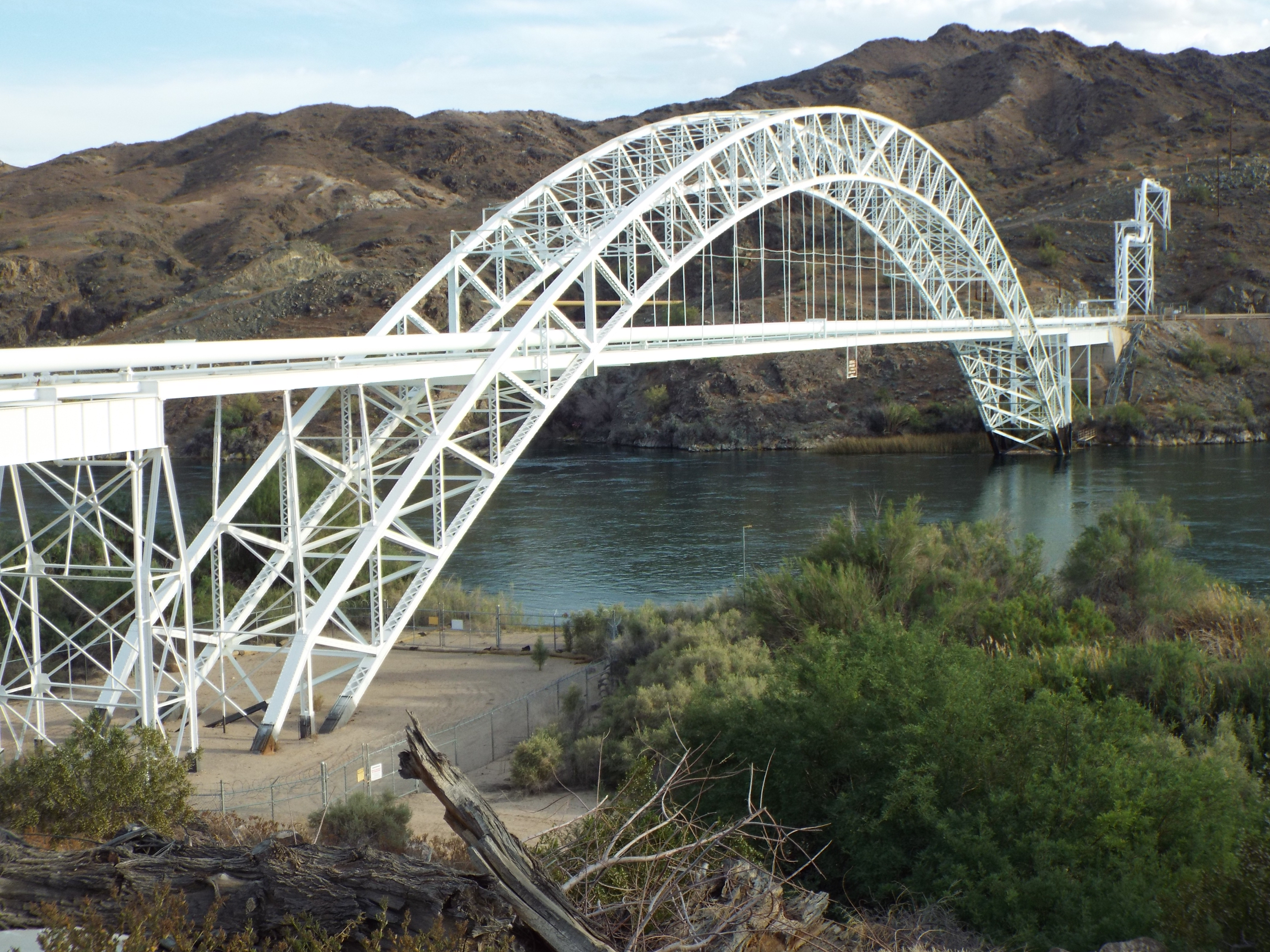
- Old Trails Bridge built in 1914

- Location in Mohave County, Arizona

- Location within Arizona Location within the United States
- Coordinates: 34°43′12″N 114°28′44″W
- State: Arizona
- County: Mohave

Area
  - Total: 0.26 sq mi (0.67 km^{2})
  - Land: 0.26 sq mi (0.67 km^{2})
  - Water: 0 sq mi (0.00 km^{2})
- Elevation: 515 ft (157 m)

Population (2020)
  - Total: 2
  - Density: 7.7/sq mi (2.97/km^{2})
- Time zone: MST
- ZIP code: 86436
- Area code: 928
- FIPS code: 04-74750
- GNIS feature ID: 2582881

Topock (Mojave: Tuupak) is a small unincorporated community and census-designated place (CDP) in Mohave County, Arizona, United States. As of the 2020 census, the population within the CDP was 2. Topock and the surrounding region have a ZIP Code of 86436; in 2010, the population of the 86436 ZCTA was 2,104, almost all of whom live in the Golden Shores CDP to the north.

Topock lies between Bullhead City and Lake Havasu City and southeast of Needles, California, on the California–Arizona border.

It is known for being a boating town as well as being home to the Old Trails Arch Bridge which used to be the old Route 66 bridge featured in the film The Grapes of Wrath. The crossings of the Colorado River at Topock, including the Old Trails Arch Bridge, are also featured prominently in the opening credits of the movie Easy Rider.

Topock Marina is located just off I-40 on Historic Route 66. Situated on the Colorado River between Needles and Lake Havasu City, the marina is the traditional refueling point for boaters traveling between these two cities.

Topock is the site of one of Pacific Gas & Electric (PG&E)'s recompression stations on its super-rich natural gas pipeline from Texas to San Francisco completed in 1930.

== History ==
Topock was originally called Mellen, a railroad station and steamboat landing, at the site where the Atlantic and Pacific Railroad built the Red Rock Bridge, a steel cantilever bridge across the Colorado River in May 1890 after three of its earlier less well-built bridges had been washed away by the river upstream at a poorly chosen site at Eastbridge, southeast of Needles, California. The town was named for Captain "Jack" Mellon, a 40-year veteran Colorado River steamboat captain and an owner of the Colorado Steam Navigation Company, though it was misspelled as "Mellen". From 1903 to 1909 Mellen had its own post office.

== Topock PG&E compressor station ==
PG&E began delivering natural gas to San Francisco and northern California in 1930 through the longest pipeline in the world, connecting the Texas gas fields to northern California with compressor stations that included compressor stations with cooling towers every 300 miles (480 km), at Topock, Arizona, on the state line, and near the town of Hinkley, California. Today there is a network of eight compressor stations linked by "40,000 miles of distribution pipelines and over 6,000 miles of transportation pipelines" serving "4.2 million customers from Bakersfield to the Oregon border."

In the 1950s and 1960s, at both Topock and Hinkley compressor stations, hexavalent chromium in the form of an additive was used in rust-prevention in "the cooling towers that prepared the gas for transportation through PG&E's pipeline to northern and central California." These cooling waters were then disposed of "adjacent to the compressor stations."

Topock Compressor Station is located in eastern San Bernardino County, California, approximately 12 miles (19 km) southeast of Needles, along the Colorado River. In 1996 following the Hinkley groundwater contamination lawsuits related to the dumping of hexavalent chromium, PG&E began "an investigation and cleanup process governed by the federal Resource Conservation and Recovery Act (RCRA) and the Comprehensive Environmental Response, Compensation, and Liability Act of 1980 (CERCLA). PG&E continues to provide reports on their soil investigation and remedial activities at the Topock compressor station site regarding potential future impacts to the Colorado River and to Arizona's groundwater.

== Demographics ==
Historical population
Census	Pop.	Note	%±
2020	2		—
U.S. Decennial Census

== Education ==
It is in the Topock Elementary School District and the Colorado River Union High School District.

== Gallery ==
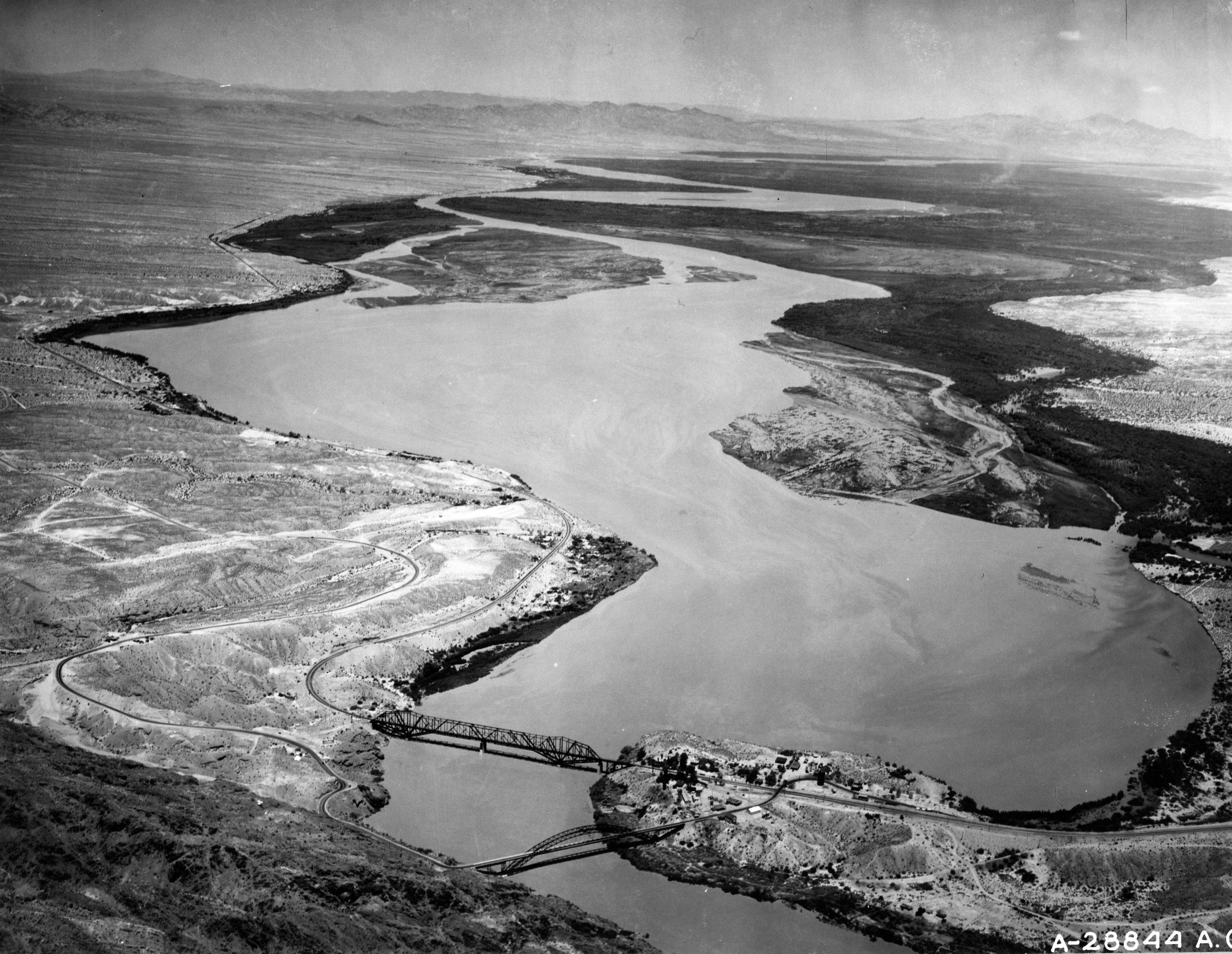
Topock in May 1932

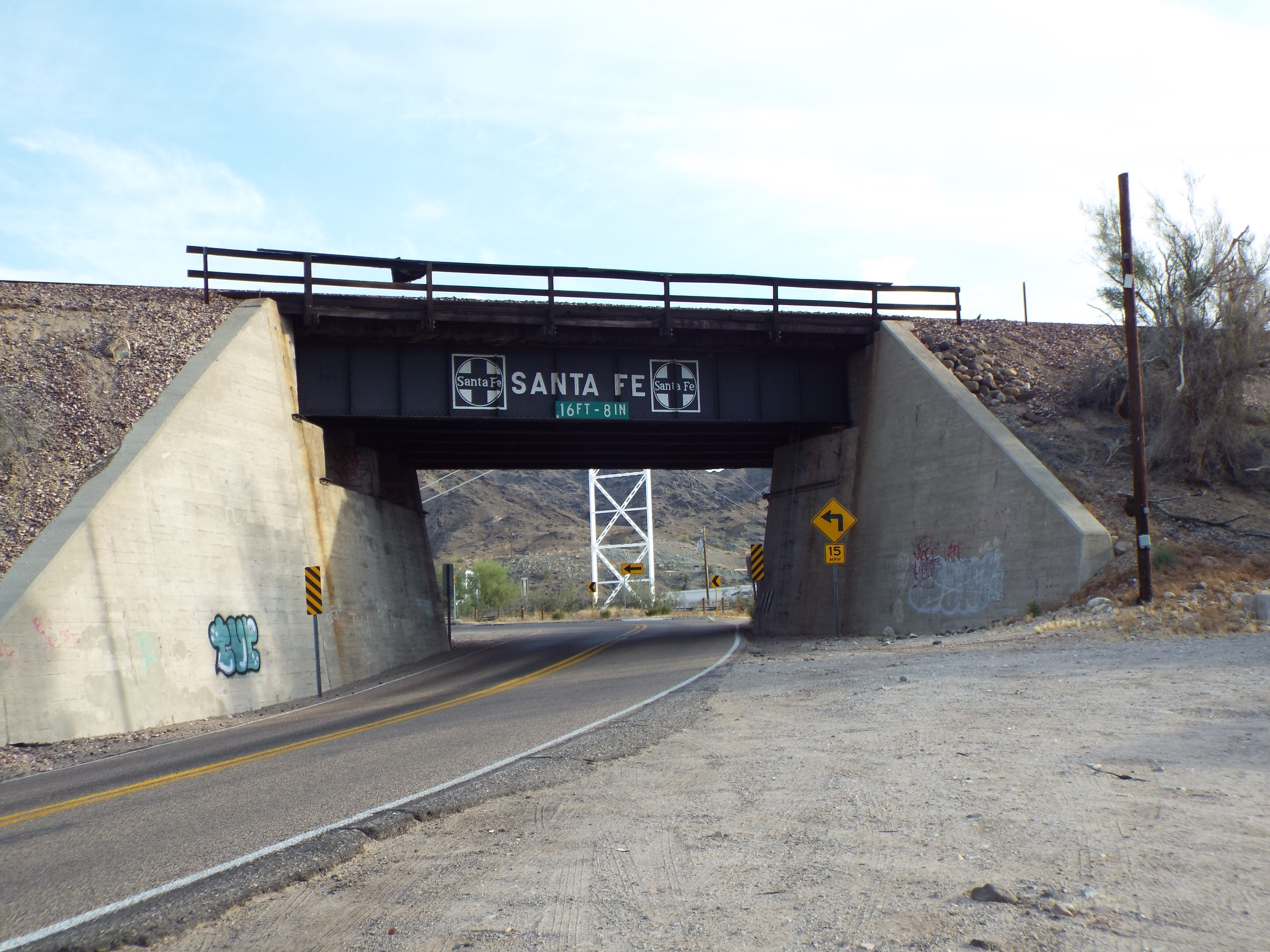
Old and historic US Highway 66 (Route 66) Santa Fe underpass built in 1945

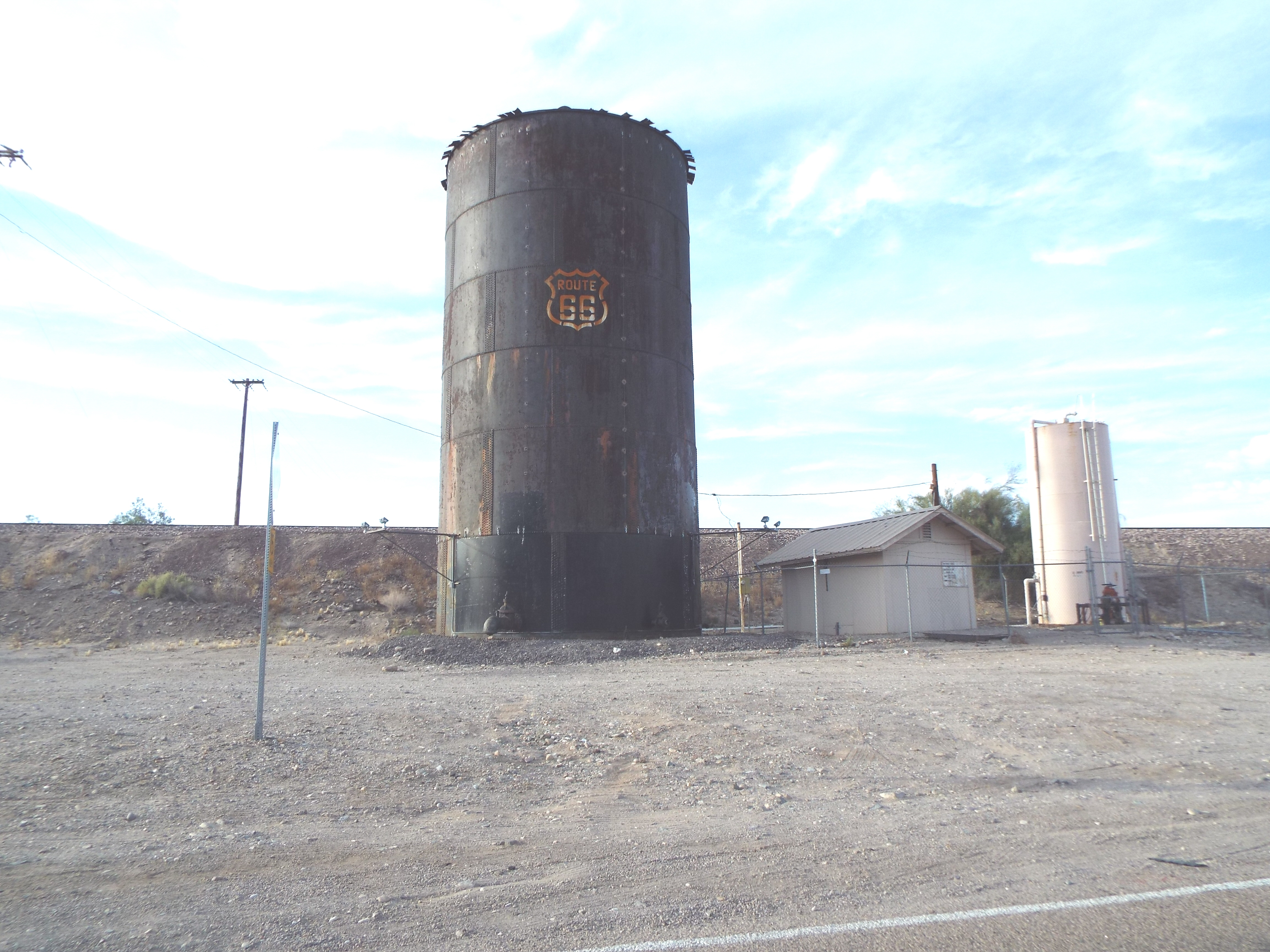
Santa Fe Water Tank on the historic Route 66 built in 1906

Topock Marsh

== See also ==
- Bullhead City, Arizona
- Fort Mohave, Arizona
- Mohave Valley, Arizona
- Yucca, Arizona
- Santa Claus, Arizona
