= Red Rock Bridge =

Former Colorado River bridge in Arizona

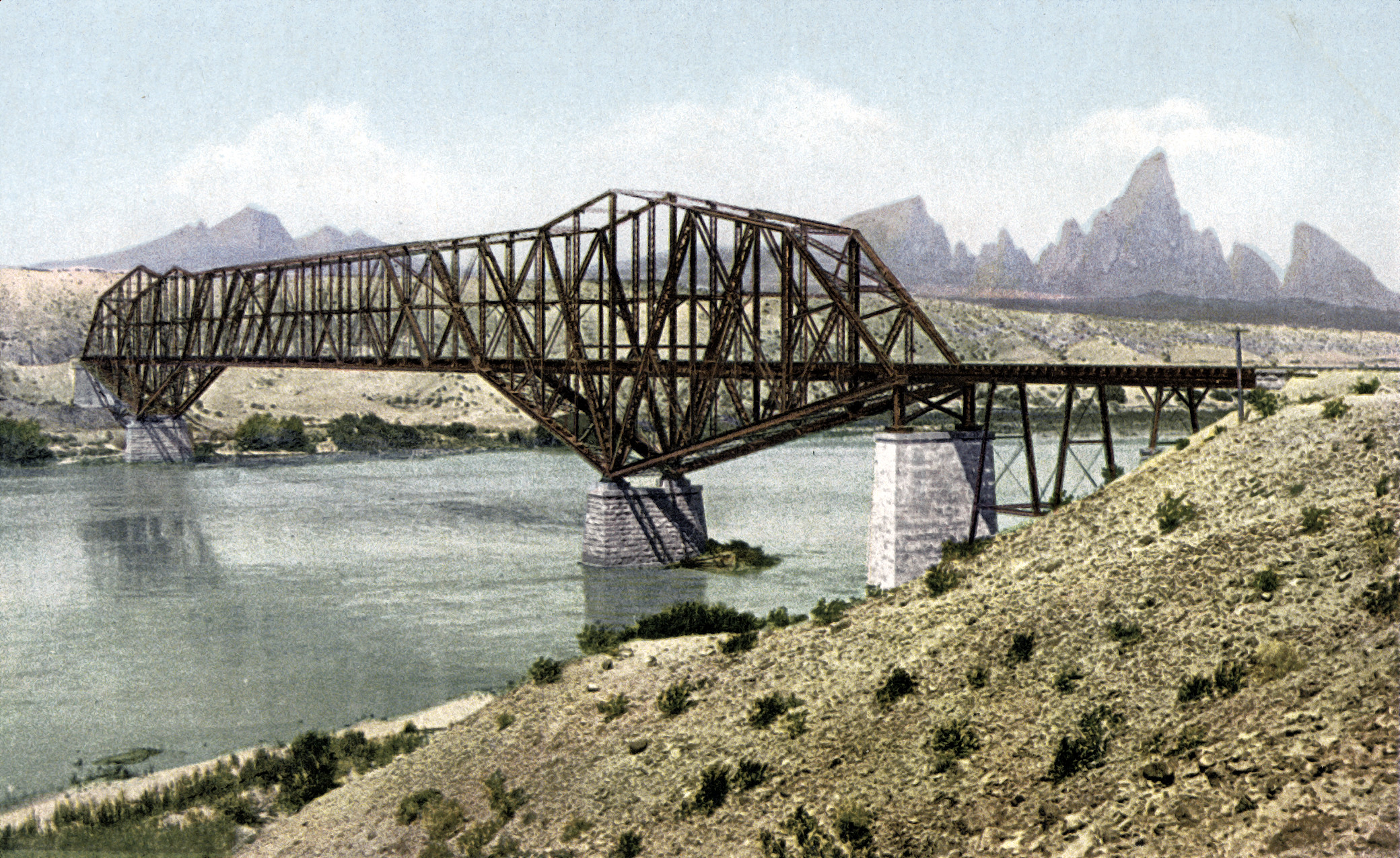
- A postcard of the Red Rock Bridge, c. 1901–1902
- Coordinates: 34.71817°N 114.48767°W
- Carries: Atchison, Topeka and Santa Fe Railway (1890–1945); US 66 (1947–1966)
- Crosses: Colorado River
- Locale: Arizona, California

Characteristics
- Design: Cantilever, Truss
- Material: Steel
- Total length: 990 feet (300 m)
- Clearance below: 41 feet (12 m)

History
- Designer: John Alexander Low Waddell
- Constructed by: Phoenix Bridge Company
- Construction start: 1890
- Construction end: 1890
- Construction cost: $500,000 ($15.9 million in 2024)
- Rebuilt: 1947
- Closed: 1966, dismantled in 1976

Location
- Interactive map of Red Rock Bridge

The Red Rock Bridge was a bridge across the Colorado River at Topock, Arizona that carried the Atlantic & Pacific Railroad. It was built in 1890, replacing a wooden bridge dating to 1883 that was repeatedly washed out during spring flooding. It was used by the railroad until 1945 when a new bridge was built. The Red Rock Bridge was then converted to carry the automobile traffic of U.S. Route 66, and did so from 1947 until 1966 when Route 66 traffic was directed onto the Interstate 40 bridge. At that time the Red Rock Bridge was abandoned, and it was eventually dismantled in 1976.

== History ==
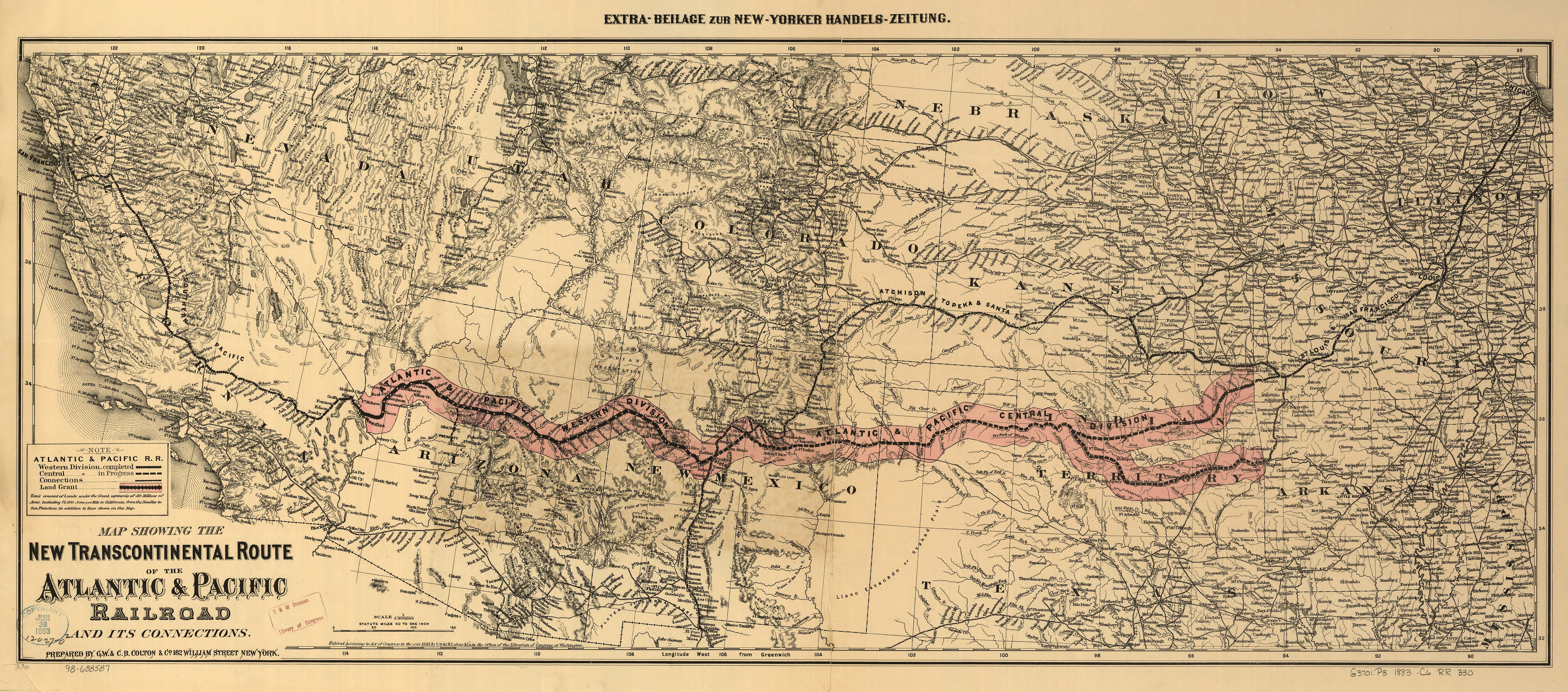
Atlantic & Pacific Route Map

In 1880, the Atlantic & Pacific railroad's Western division began construction of a line from Isleta, New Mexico, heading west to meet the Southern Pacific at Needles, California, on the western bank of the Colorado just north of Topock. The Southern Pacific was simultaneously building eastward from Mohave, California, to Needles. The line reached Kingman, Arizona, in 1882. The first bridge across the Colorado, made entirely of wood, was completed in May 1883 and the two railroads met in Needles August 9 of that year. This crossing was at Eastbridge, Arizona, three miles south of Needles. The bridge was over 1,600 feet (490 m) long and was built on pilings driven into the alluvial soils of the flood plain of the Mohave Valley. The site had no solid base on either bank.

The wooden bridge was washed away in 1884, rebuilt and again destroyed in 1886, and again in 1888. This led the railroad to seek a better bridge that could withstand the strong spring currents of the Colorado when it carried the winter snow melt. A new crossing was located about 10 miles (16 km) farther south at Topock, Arizona where the bridge could be built on rock foundations.

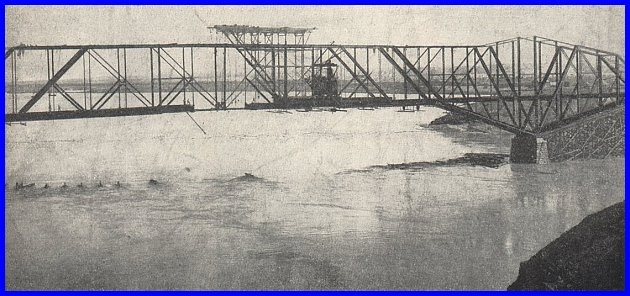
A photograph of the bridge nearly complete in 1890

In 1890, the railroad hired the Phoenix Iron Company to build a new bridge, one of the first steel bridges in the country. The cost was nearly $500,000, which was the equivalent to $15.9 million in 2024. The bridge was a single-track 990-foot (300 m) cantilever through-truss bridge. The bridge had a center suspended span of 330 feet (100 m), a clearance of 41 feet (12 m) above the high water level of the river, and contained 750 tons of steel. It was designed by John Alexander Low Waddell and was built in eighty days under Wadell's supervision. When constructed, it was the largest cantilever bridge in the country.

The bridge was built at the head of Mohave Canyon, within Topock Gorge, upon piers of red sandstone, quarried in Prescott Junction. The piers, one on each bank 660 feet (200 m) apart and a third in the river 140 feet (43 m) from the west bank, were built by Sooysmith & Co. Connecting the new bridge to the old track required about 10 miles (16 km) of new track on the California side and about 3.5 miles (5.6 km) on the Arizona side.

Because of increasing weights of trains, the bridge was strengthened in 1901 with additional stringers and heavier floor beams. Even heavier locomotives required further strengthening of the trusses in 1910.

== Early use by automobiles ==
Automobiles using the National Old Trails Road crossed the Colorado in the early 20th century by the Needles Ferry. Flooding in 1914 disabled the ferry service, and the bridge was put into use by cars when wooden planks were laid across the railroad ties. Railroad employees allowed cars onto the bridge between scheduled train traffic. The railroad charged each motorist a toll to cross the bridge. This continued until the opening of the Old Trails Bridge, approximately 800 feet (240 m) downstream, on February 20, 1916.

== Wildlife Refuge ==
In 1941, 30 miles (48 km) of the lower Colorado, from Needles to Lake Havasu City, Arizona was designated as the Havasu National Wildlife Refuge to provide habitat for migratory birds. The Red Rock Bridge was within the refuge.

== Replacement ==
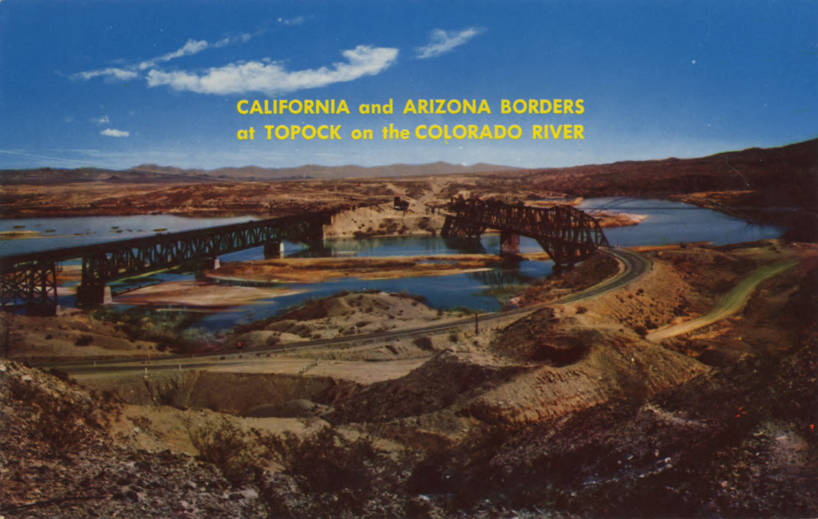
A postcard of the three bridges crossing the Colorado River, by which time, the Red Rock Bridge carried U.S. Route 66

By 1945, the railroad (now the Santa Fe) constructed a new rail bridge over the Colorado. The railroad agreed to remove the Red Rock bridge at the time the replacement bridge was authorized. However, since the Old Trails Bridge was insufficient to carry the current auto and truck traffic of U.S. Route 66, it was decided that the Red Rock Bridge could be used for the roadway. Re-purposing the bridge was also less expensive than demolition. A bill, introduced by Arizona Senator Ernest McFarland on November 30, 1944 and subsequently passed by Congress authorizing the railroad to convey ownership of the bridge to the states of California and Arizona and was signed into law by President Roosevelt on January 6, 1945. Joint ownership by the states of the bridge was accepted on August 24, 1945, in the office of Arizona Governor Sidney Osborn. The railway also donated several miles of right of way leading to the bridge. The ties were removed and replaced with a concrete road deck, at an estimated cost of $60,000 (equivalent to $826,432 in 2024). California allocated $130,000 (equivalent to $1.79 million in 2024) for the project, including approach work. The bridge provided a vehicular river crossing without the weight limit that was imposed at the Old Trails Bridge.

The Red Rock Bridge re-opened for auto traffic on May 21, 1947, now carrying US 66. The Old Trails Bridge was subsequently sold to private ownership, becoming the property of Pacific Gas and Electric, which retrofitted the bridge to carry a natural gas pipeline across the Colorado River. The Red Rock functioned as a highway bridge for almost twenty years, until Interstate 40 was built with a new four-lane steel bridge. The old bridge was abandoned in 1966 and stood unused until it was demolished in 1976. The only remnants are concrete pilings on either side of the river where the bridge once stood, where Old Trails Bridge remains standing, still a vital part of an operational gas pipeline.
