= California State Route 40 =

Two highways in the U.S. state of California have been signed as Route 40:

- Interstate 40 in California, part of the Interstate Highway System but simply referred to as "Route 40" in state law
- U.S. Route 40 in California (1928-1964)
