= Interstate 40 in California =

Interstate highway in California

Interstate 40
- Needles Freeway
- I-40 highlighted in red

Route information
- Maintained by Caltrans
- Length: 154.64 mi (248.87 km)
- Existed: 1964–present
- NHS: Entire route

Major junctions
- West end: I-15 in Barstow
- US 95 in Needles
- East end: I-40 at the Arizona state line near Topock, AZ

Location
- Country: United States
- State: California
- Counties: San Bernardino

Highway system
- Interstate Highway System; Main; Auxiliary; Suffixed; Business; Future; State highways in California; Interstate; US; State; Scenic; History; Pre‑1964; Unconstructed; Deleted; Freeways
← SR 39	→ SR 41

Interstate 40 (I-40) is a major east–west Interstate Highway in the United States, stretching from Barstow, California, to Wilmington, North Carolina. The segment of I-40 in California is sometimes called the Needles Freeway. It passes through the eastern fringe of the Inland Empire metropolitan area, going east from its western terminus at I-15 in Barstow across the Mojave Desert in San Bernardino County past the Clipper Mountains to Needles, before it crosses over the Colorado River into Arizona east of Needles. All 155 miles (249 km) of I-40 in California are in San Bernardino County.

== Route description ==
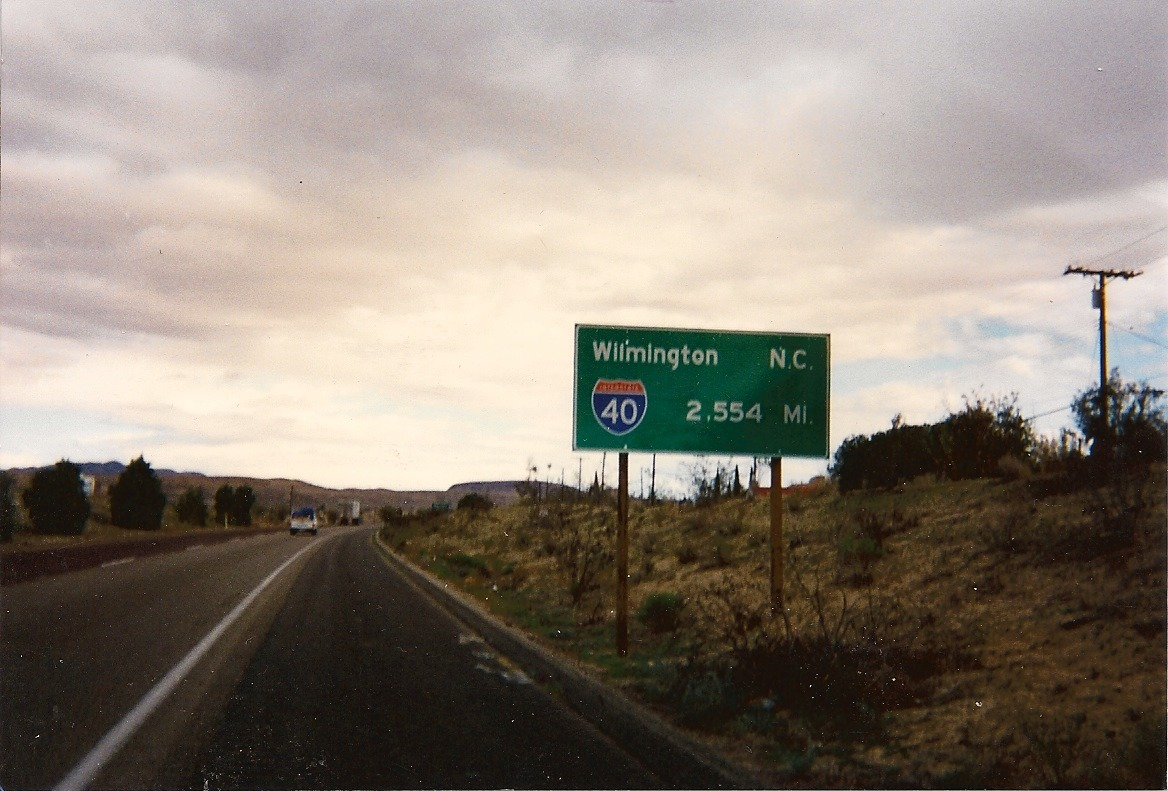
A 1997 photo of the mileage sign at the start of I-40 in Barstow, showing the distance to the freeway's eastern terminus in Wilmington, North Carolina. This sign had been stolen several times.

The entirety of Interstate 40 in California is defined in section 340 of the California Streets and Highways Code as Route 40, and that the highway is from "Route 15 at Barstow to the Arizona state line near Topock, Arizona via Needles." This corresponds with the Federal Highway Administration (FHWA)'s route logs of I-40.

I-40 goes through the Mojave Desert on the entirety of its run through California. The highway starts its eastward journey at a junction with I-15 in Barstow. The freeway passes through Marine Corps Logistics Base Barstow before leaving the city limits. I-40 provides access to the town of Daggett but passes south of the town. After passing south of the Barstow-Daggett Airport, I-40 goes through Newberry Springs and Ludlow before traveling along the south end of Mojave National Preserve. Several miles east of the preserve, I-40 intersects U.S. Route 95 (US 95), and the two highways run concurrently into the city of Needles. In Needles, US 95 continues south while I-40 continues east through Mojave National Preserve and across the Colorado River into Arizona. The maximum speed limit for the entire California segment of I-40 is 70 mph (110 km/h).

I-40 is part of the California Freeway and Expressway System and is part of the National Highway System, a network of highways that are considered essential to the country's economy, defense, and mobility by the Federal Highway Administration. I-40 is eligible for the State Scenic Highway System, but it is not officially designated as a scenic highway by the California Department of Transportation. I-40 from I-15 to the Arizona state line is known as the Needles Freeway, as named by Senate Concurrent Resolution 1 in 1968.

== History ==
In 1957, the California Department of Highways proposed that the route be numbered as I-30 because of the already existing US 40 in the state. However, this was rejected, and, eventually, US 40 was decommissioned in favor of I-80.

Today, the Needles Freeway replaced the former US 66 across the Mojave Desert. As a result, a number of communities along the former route, like Amboy, have become ghost-towns.

In the early 1960s, Project Carryall, a component of Project Plowshare, would have detonated 22 nuclear explosions to excavate a massive roadcut through the Bristol Mountains to accommodate a better alignment of I-40 and a new rail line. This proposal was abandoned by the California State Department of Highways in 1968. The section between Ludlow and Needles was constructed using conventional explosives and excavation and designed with culverts for migrating Bighorn sheep and water tanks. It opened to traffic on April 13, 1973.

A sign at that start of I-40 in Barstow showing the distance to Wilmington, North Carolina, had been stolen multiple times.

== Exit list ==
The entire route is in San Bernardino County.

Location	mi	km	Exit	Destinations	Notes
Barstow	0.00	0.00		I-15 south to SR 58 west – San Bernardino	Western terminus; access to I-15 north via exit 1; I-15 north exit 184A
Barstow	0.79	1.27	1	Montara Road to CR 66	Eastbound signage
Barstow	0.79	1.27	1	East Main Street / I-15 BL / Historic US 66 (CR 66) to I-15 north – Las Vegas	Westbound signage; west end of CR 66 overlap; former US 66
Barstow	2.35	3.78	2	Marine Corps Logistics Base (East Main Street)	
Barstow	4.71	7.58	5	Nebo Street (CR 66 east)	East end of CR 66 overlap; eastbound exit and westbound entrance
Daggett	7.18	11.56	7	A Street – Daggett	
	12.19	19.62	12	Airport Road – Barstow-Daggett Airport	
Newberry Springs	18.45	29.69	18	Newberry Springs (CR 66)	Former US 66
	23.33	37.55	23	Fort Cady Road – Newberry Springs	
	28.50	45.87	Desert Oasis Rest Area		
	32.50	52.30	33	Hector Road	
Ludlow	49.98	80.44	50	Ludlow (CR 66)	Former US 66
	78.17	125.80	78	Kelbaker Road	
	99.73	160.50	100	Essex Road – Essex	Serves Providence Mountains State Recreation Area, Mojave National Preserve
	106.94	172.10	John Wilkie Rest Area – Fenner		
Fenner	107.17	172.47	107	Goffs Road (CR 66) – Essex	Former US 66
	115.19	185.38	115	Mountain Springs Road	former US 66 west
	119.97	193.07	120	Water Road	
	132.73	213.61	133	US 95 north – Searchlight, Las Vegas	West end of US 95 overlap; former US 66 west
Needles	139.11	223.88	139	River Road Cutoff	Eastbound exit and westbound entrance; former US 66 east
Needles	141.01	226.93	141	W. Broadway (I-40 BL east) / River Road (Historic US 66)	Former US 66
Needles	142.37	229.12	142	J Street – Downtown Needles	
Needles	143.76	231.36	144	US 95 south / Historic US 66 (E. Broadway / I-40 BL west) – Blythe	East end of US 95 overlap; former US 66
	148.19	238.49	148	Five Mile Road	Former US 66
	149.10	239.95	Agricultural Inspection Station (westbound)		
	153.31	246.73	153	Park Moabi Road	
Colorado River	154.64	248.87	California–Arizona line		
Colorado River	154.64	248.87		I-40 east – Kingman	Continuation into Arizona
1.000 mi = 1.609 km; 1.000 km = 0.621 mi: Concurrency terminus; Incomplete access

== Related routes ==
California does not have any auxiliary Interstate Highways associated with I-40.

One business loop of I-40 exists in the state, running through Needles. It is also designated as Historic Route 66 since it follows the former routing of US 66.

== See also ==
Interstate 40
Previous state: Terminus	California	Next state: Arizona
