= California State Route 62 =

Highway in California

State Route 62
- SR 62 highlighted in red

Route information
- Maintained by Caltrans
- Length: 151.438 mi (243.716 km)
- Tourist routes: Twentynine Palms Highway between I-10 and the Riverside–San Bernardino county line.

Major junctions
- West end: I-10 near Palm Springs
- SR 247 in Yucca Valley; SR 177 near Rice; US 95 near Vidal
- East end: SR 95 Truck at Arizona state line in Parker, AZ

Location
- Country: United States
- State: California
- Counties: Riverside, San Bernardino

Highway system
- State highways in California; Interstate; US; State; Scenic; History; Pre‑1964; Unconstructed; Deleted; Freeways
← SR 61	→ SR 63

State Route 62 (SR 62) is a state highway in the U.S. state of California that cuts across the Little San Bernardino Mountains in Riverside and San Bernardino counties. Its western terminus is at Interstate 10 in unincorporated Riverside County outside the borders of Whitewater and Palm Springs. Its eastern terminus is at the Arizona state line just east of Parker, Arizona. The highway passes through the city of Twentynine Palms and along the northern boundary of the Joshua Tree National Park.

== Route description ==
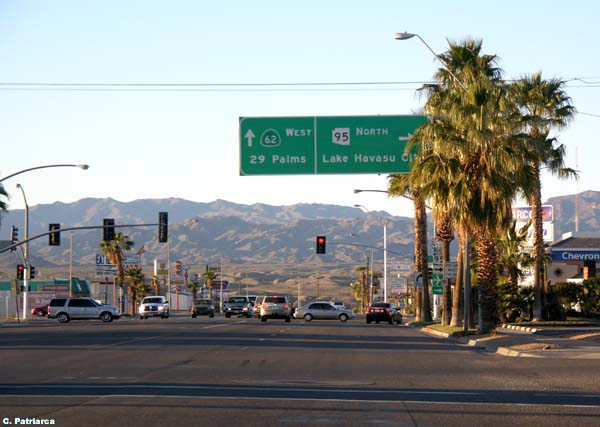
Signage at the eastern terminus in Parker, Arizona

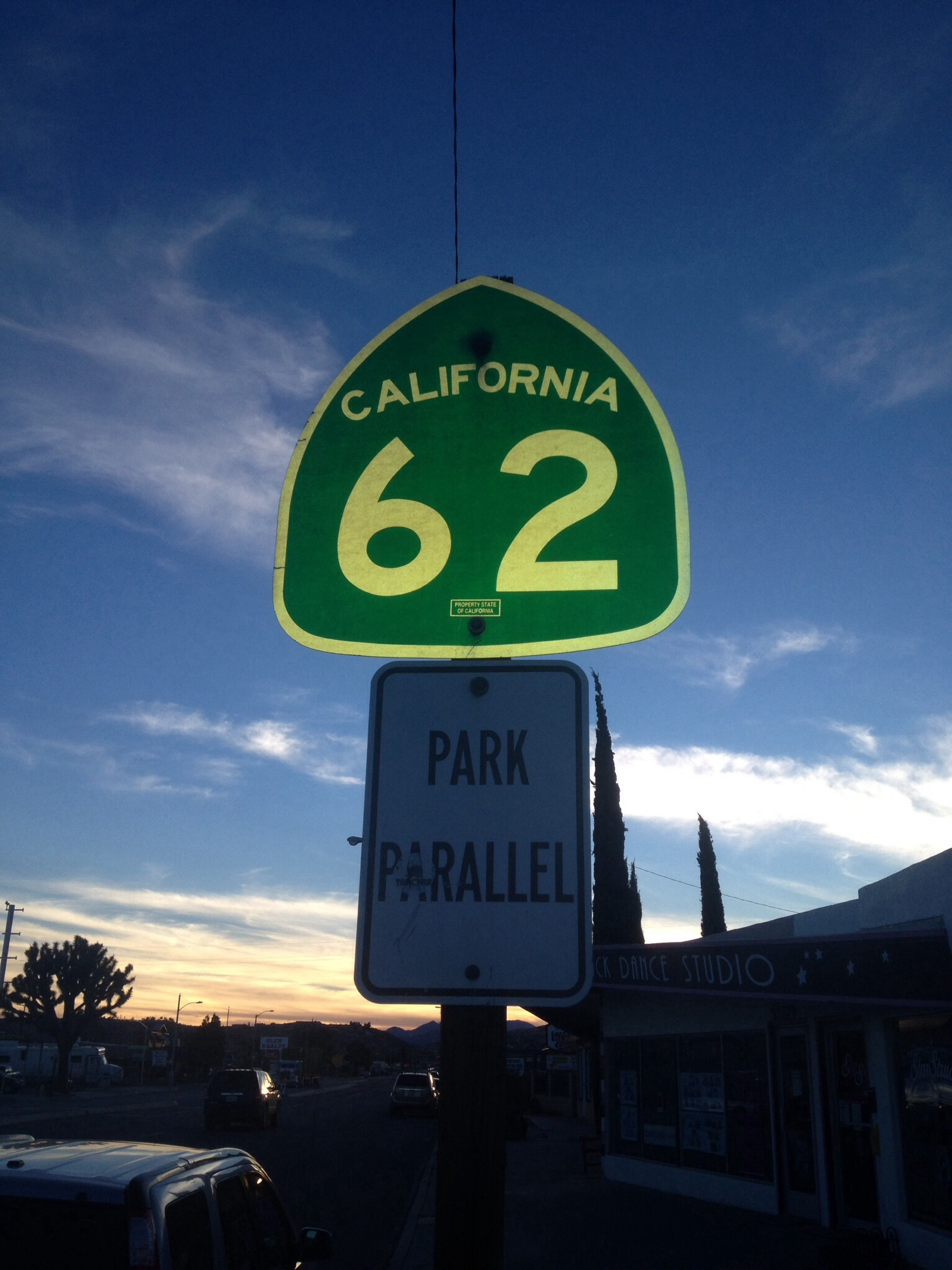
California Route 62 Marker

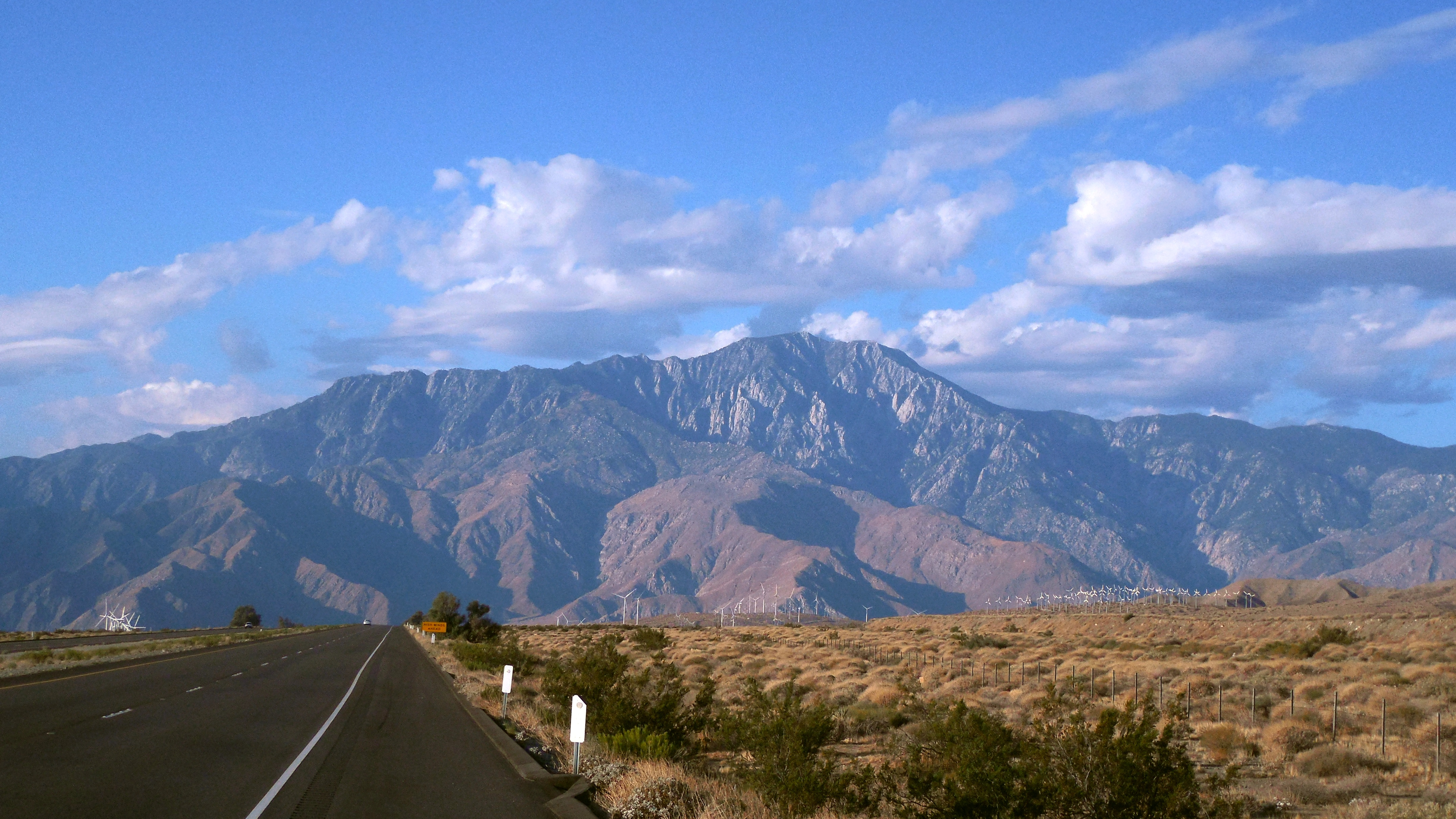
Southerly view of the San Jacinto Mountains, near the western terminus near Whitewater, California

Route 62 is defined in section 362 of the California Streets and Highways Code, and that the highway is "from Route 10 near Whitewater to the Arizona state line near Earp via Morongo Valley, the vicinity of Yucca Valley, Twentynine Palms, Rice, and Vidal Junction."

SR 62 cuts across the Little San Bernardino Mountains along southern San Bernardino County. It begins at a freeway-to-freeway interchange with Interstate 10 at the eastern end of the San Gorgonio Pass northwest of Palm Springs in Riverside County. It heads due north until its intersection with SR 247 in Yucca Valley, and then it heads east through the unincorporated community of Joshua Tree and the city of Twentynine Palms. In 1970, Route 62 ended at the eastern city limit of Twentynine Palms, but it was later extended along the northern boundary of the Joshua Tree National Park to meet Arizona State Route 95 in Parker, Arizona. East of Twentynine Palms, there is a sign warning drivers that there are no services for 100 miles (160 km) until reaching Vidal Junction where SR 62 meets US 95. This is one of the most desolate stretches of highway in California, and consequently, the most heavily traveled portion is between I-10 and Twentynine Palms. Travelers between the eastern Coachella Valley and the river utilize that more desolate stretch as the fastest route to the resorts of the Colorado River, accessing it via California State Route 177 in Desert Center.

In 2014, the Palm Springs Desert Sun newspaper reported that a dozen marines from the Marine Corps Air Ground Combat Center Twentynine Palms have been killed in accidents on Highway 62 since 2007 (out of a total of 33 vehicle-related deaths among personnel at the base); the paper attributed the problem in part to the base's unusually remote location, leaving personnel few options for entertainment.

SR 62 is part of the California Freeway and Expressway System, and west of the military base is part of the National Highway System, a network of highways that are considered essential to the country's economy, defense, and mobility by the Federal Highway Administration. SR 62 is eligible for the State Scenic Highway System, and is recognized by Caltrans as a scenic highway for 9 miles (14 km) from its western terminus at I-10 to the Riverside–San Bernardino county line, meaning that it is a substantial section of highway passing through a "memorable landscape" with no "visual intrusions", where the potential designation has gained popular favor with the community. SR 62 is designated as a Blue Star Memorial Highway from Interstate 10 to Adobe Road in Twentynine Palms. SR 62 is known as the Twentynine Palms Highway from I-10 to SR 177.

== History ==
The routing west of Twentynine Palms was added to the state highway system in phases, with the part from White Water to Morongo Valley added in 1935, and from Morongo Valley to Yucca Valley in 1959; both were designated as Route 187. From Yucca Valley to Twentynine Palms, Route 218 was added in 1961. In the 1964 state highway renumbering, SR 62 was designated from I-10 into the town of Twentynine Palms. The portion from Twentynine Palms to Arizona was added to SR 62 in 1970.

== Major intersections ==
Except where prefixed with a letter, postmiles were measured on the road as it was in 1964, based on the alignment that existed at the time, and do not necessarily reflect current mileage. Postmile prefixes include: R reflecting a realignment in the route since then, M indicating a second realignment, L referring to an overlap due to a correction or change, and T indicating postmiles classified as temporary. Segments that remain unconstructed or have been relinquished to local control may be omitted. The numbers reset at county lines; the start and end postmiles in each county are given in the county column.

County	Location	Postmile	Destinations	Notes
Riverside; RIV 0.00-9.24		0.00	I-10 – Los Angeles, Indio	Interchange; westbound exit and eastbound entrance; west end of SR 62; former US 99; I-10 exit 117
Riverside; RIV 0.00-9.24		R6.45	North Indian Canyon Drive	Base of the Morongo Grade, a gentle, mountainous stretch of highway leading to the Morongo Basin
San Bernardino; SBD 0.00-79.48	Yucca Valley	12.40	SR 247 north (Old Woman Springs Road) / Joshua Lane – Landers, Lucerne Valley, Victorville	
San Bernardino; SBD 0.00-79.48	Joshua Tree	18.26	Park Boulevard	Serves Joshua Tree National Park
San Bernardino; SBD 0.00-79.48	Twentynine Palms	34.22	Utah Trail – Amboy	Serves Joshua Tree National Park
Riverside; RIV 79.48-90.20		84.97	SR 177 south (Rice Road) – Desert Center	
San Bernardino; SBD 90.20-142.66	Vidal Junction	125.76	US 95 – Needles, Blythe	
San Bernardino; SBD 90.20-142.66	Vidal Junction	125.76	Agricultural Inspection Station (westbound only)	
Colorado River		142.66	California–Arizona state line	
Colorado River		142.66	SR 95 Truck (California Avenue) to SR 95 – Parker, Phoenix	East end of SR 62; continuation into Arizona
1.000 mi = 1.609 km; 1.000 km = 0.621 mi
