= County Route 66 (San Bernardino County, California) =

County road in San Bernardino County, California, United States

County Road 66
- National Trails Highway
- CR 66 highlighted in red

Route information
- Length: 175.7 mi (282.8 km)
- Existed: 2011–present
- Tourist routes: Historic Route 66 National Scenic Byway (Barstow to near Needles)

Major junctions
- West end: 1st Street in Oro Grande
- SR 58 in Barstow; I-15 BL in Barstow; I-15 in Barstow; I-40 in Barstow; I-40 in Newberry Springs; I-40 in Ludlow; I-40 in Fenner
- East end: US 95 near Needles

Location
- Country: United States
- State: California
- County: San Bernardino

Highway system
- County routes in California
← CR S80	→ CR A1

County Route 66 (CR 66) is a 175.7-mile (282.8 km) east–west county highway in San Bernardino County, California, United States that runs along a section of former U.S. Route 66 (US 66). It goes from Oro Grande (north of downtown Victorville) to U.S. Route 95 (US 95) northwest of Needles. CR 66 connects communities that were bypassed by Interstate 40 (I-40) such as Oro Grande and Amboy. It is the only numbered county route in San Bernardino County.

== Route description ==
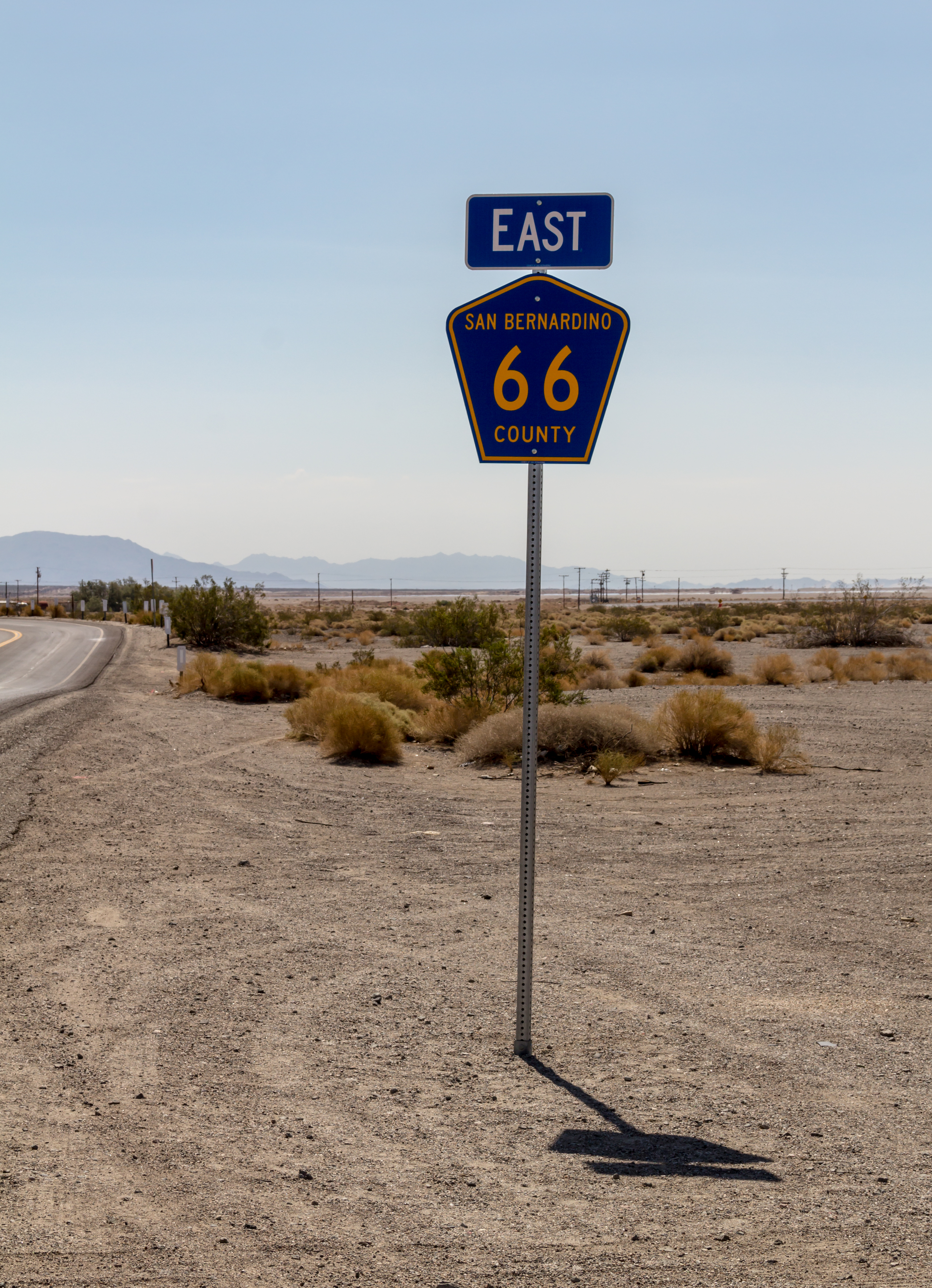
CR 66 sign near Amboy

The route is part of the California Route Marker Program. CR 66 begins at its western terminus, on the National Trails Highway at the intersection of 1st Street in unincorporated Oro Grande, near the Victorville city limits. From there, it heads north towards Barstow where it becomes Main Street headed eastbound. After an overlap with Interstate 15 Business (I-15 BL), it continues south to the I-40 interchange, where it runs concurrently with I-40 east for four miles (6.4 km) before splitting from the freeway at the Nebo Street exit. At that junction, CR 66 runs parallel to I-40 all the way to Ludlow, but then turns southeast towards Amboy Crater National Natural Landmark and the town of Amboy. It then heads back towards I-40, crossing paths with the freeway again at Fenner, before heading east on Goffs Road to the junction with US 95, where it terminates.

At 175.7 miles (282.8 km) in length, CR 66 is the longest county route in California, and it is even longer than some Interstate highways.

The CR 66 sign program began in San Bernardino County in June 2011, defining the route from just north of I-15 in Victorville to US 95 northwest of Needles. Although the route officially stops short of the Victorville city limits, there has been signage for the route within that city.

In 2012, the county announced an extension to the sign program which would sign the route through Needles.

== History ==

CR 66 originally was part of the historic US 66, established in 1926. California decommissioned this highway in 1979, and in 1985, it was decommissioned nationally. In 2011, San Bernardino County Supervisor Brad Mitzlefelt proposed Resolution 63, which would establish a county route with the number 66, as a tribute to the original "Mother Road". Route markers were first installed in September 2011, upon passage of the resolution, which also allowed the possibility of the route being extended in the future along other parts of old US 66 in San Bernardino County. In May 2012, the County Board of Supervisors designated CR 66 a County Scenic Highway.

Since flash flooding in 2014, CR 66 has been closed between Chambless and Essex due to multiple bridge failures.

San Bernardino County Public Works is in the process of replacing 128 timber bridges in excess of 80 years of age. No known date of reopening is known as of 2023.

As of 2024, Public Works has only repaired 12 bridges.

In February 2024, Public works started the environmental review to replace another 33 bridges along the route.

== Major junctions ==
Location	mi	km	Destinations	Notes
Oro Grande	0.00	0.00	1st Street	Western terminus; road continues south as National Trails Highway; former US 66 west
Barstow	27.7	44.6	SR 58 – San Bernardino, Las Vegas, Bakersfield	Interchange; SR 58 exit 233
Barstow	29.6	47.6	L Street (I-15 BL west) to I-15	Western end of I-15 BL overlap
Barstow	33.1	53.3	I-15 – San Bernardino, Las Vegas	Interchange; I-15 exit 184
Barstow	33.6	54.1	I-40 west / I-15 BL ends	Eastern end of I-15 BL overlap; western end of I-40 overlap; I-40 exit 1; eastern terminus of I-15 BL
Barstow	33.6	54.1	West end of freeway on I-40	
Barstow	35.4	57.0	Marine Corps Logistics Base	Exit number follows I-40; I-40 exit 2
	37.8	60.8	East end of freeway on I-40	
	37.8	60.8	I-40 east	Eastern end of I-40 overlap; no access to I-40 east from CR 66 westbound; I-40 exit 5
Newberry Springs	51.8	83.4	I-40 – Needles	Interchange; I-40 exit 18
Ludlow	83.7	134.7	I-40 – Barstow, Needles	Interchange; I-40 exit 50
	115.1	185.2	Kelbaker Road – Kelso	
Fenner	151.1	243.2	I-40 – Barstow, Needles	Interchange; I-40 exit 107
	175.7	282.8	US 95 – Searchlight, Las Vegas, Needles	Eastern terminus; US 95 south is former US 66 east
1.000 mi = 1.609 km; 1.000 km = 0.621 mi: Concurrency terminus
