= California State Route 247 =

Highway in California

State Route 247
- SR 247 highlighted in red

Route information
- Maintained by Caltrans
- Length: 78.084 mi (125.664 km)
- Existed: 1964–present

Major junctions
- South end: SR 62 in Yucca Valley
- Old Woman Springs Road to SR 18 near Lucerne Valley
- North end: I-15 in Barstow

Location
- Country: United States
- State: California
- Counties: San Bernardino

Highway system
- State highways in California; Interstate; US; State; Scenic; History; Pre‑1964; Unconstructed; Deleted; Freeways
← SR 246	→ SR 253

State Route 247 (SR 247) is a state highway in the U.S. state of California. The road passes through the Mojave Desert in San Bernardino County, connecting SR 62 in Yucca Valley to Interstate 15 (I-15) in Barstow. SR 247 runs along Old Woman Springs Road between Yucca Valley to Lucerne Valley, and Barstow Road between Lucerne Valley and Barstow. SR 247 was designated by the California State Legislature in 1969; the county roads along that route were given to the state in 1972.

== Route description ==
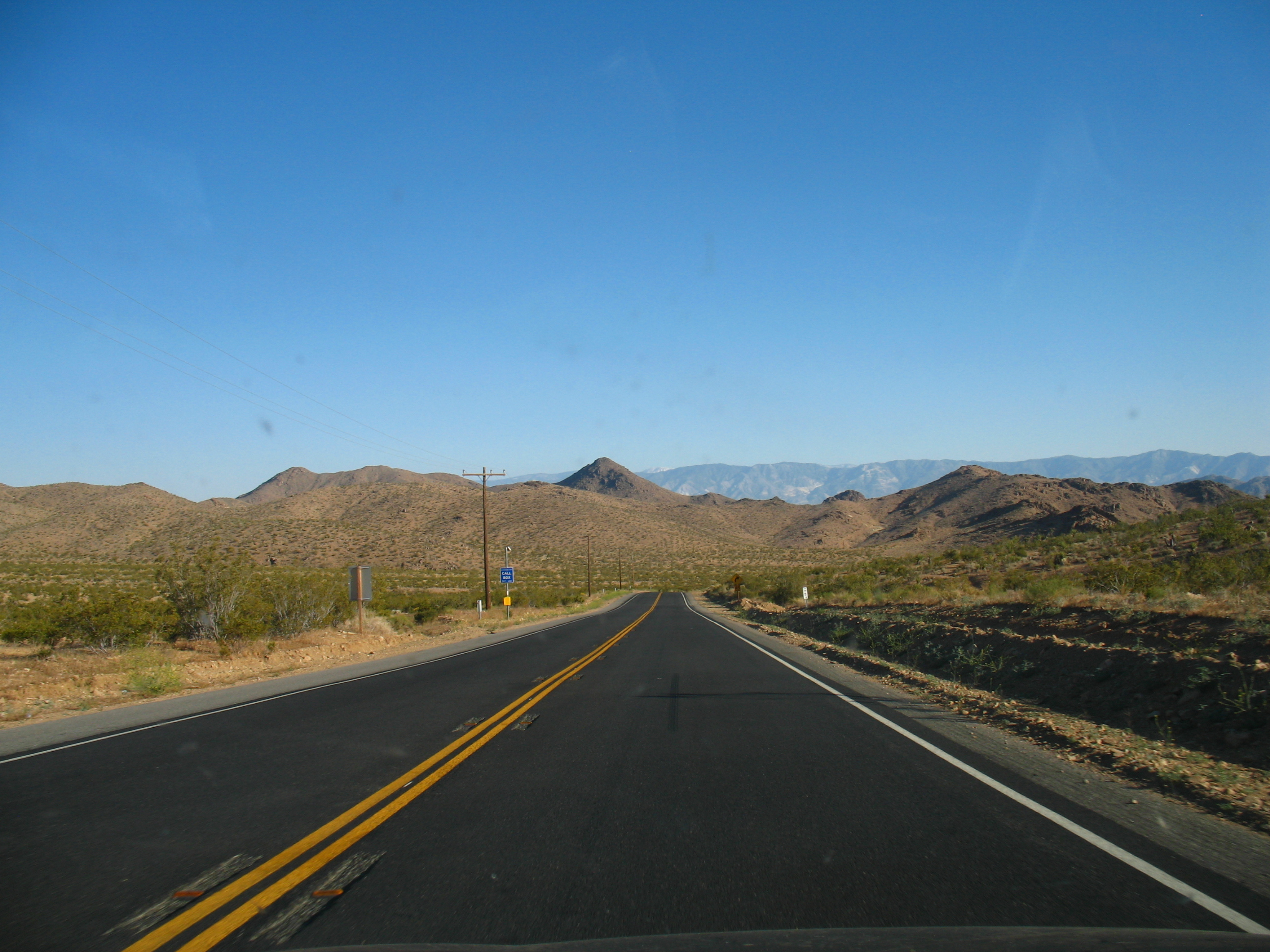
SR 247 between Lucerne Valley and Barstow

Route 247 is defined in section 547 of the California Streets and Highways Code:

Route 247 is from:
(a) Route 62 near Yucca Valley to Route 18 near Lucerne Valley.
(b) Route 18 near Lucerne Valley to Route 15 in Barstow.

SR 247 begins at a junction with SR 62 in the town of Yucca Valley, where it is signed as Old Woman Springs Road. From Yucca Valley, the two-lane highway heads northwestward through desert and parallels the north side of the San Bernardino Mountains, much of it through Johnson Valley, briefly passing through Flamingo Heights and the western tip of Landers.

In the town of Lucerne Valley, SR 18 and SR 247 do not actually intersect, but the highways are less than 0.125 miles (0.201 km) apart, connected by the continuation of Old Woman Springs Road to extend SR 18 to SR 247. A right turn at this intersection instead changes SR 247's path due north as Barstow Road towards Barstow and its northern terminus at I-15, passing by Barstow Community College. However, continuing straight on Old Woman Springs Road, instead of turning right at this intersection, leads to SR 18, heading west by northwest to Apple Valley and Victorville.

SR 247 is part of the California Freeway and Expressway System, but is not part of the National Highway System. The route is eligible for the State Scenic Highway System, but it is not officially designated as a scenic highway by the California Department of Transportation. In 2013, SR 247 had an annual average daily traffic (AADT) of 1,700 between Stoddard Wells Road and the Barstow city limits, and 18,000 at the northern terminus with I-15, the latter of which was the highest AADT for the highway.

== History ==
The name "Old Woman Springs" dates back to 1856 when a government survey party discovered elderly native American women camping near what is now called Cottonwood Springs in present-day Lucerne Valley. They would remain in camp, while the young went into the mountains to collect pinion nuts, which are similar to pine nuts. Cattleman Albert Swarthout then established what he called "Old Woman Springs Ranch" in 1907, which still remains on private property (this is commemorated by historical marker along SR 247, placed by the Morongo Basin Historical Society in 2004).

The California State Legislature defined Route 26 as a route from Lucerne Valley to Morongo Valley in 1959. SR 247 was designated in the 1964 state highway renumbering as a route from SR 62 in Yucca Valley to SR 18 near Lucerne Valley, and then from there to I-15 in Barstow. That year, the Lucerne Valley Chamber of Commerce began an effort to have a state highway designated from Lucerne Valley to Yucca Valley along Old Woman Springs Road. By 1969, county roads had been constructed from Barstow to Lucerne Valley, and from there to Yucca Valley. Barstow Road and Old Woman Springs Road were given to the state by San Bernardino County in 1972, although the county had agreed to perform some improvements on the two roads after the state began to maintain them.

Parts of the SR 247 roadway buckled in the Landers earthquake of 1992, and 10 miles (16 km) of the highway was closed while repairs took place. In 2001, Caltrans indicated that most of the highway was considered "maintain only" until 2020, except for the portions in Yucca Valley and Barstow, which were to be widened to six lanes.

== Major intersections ==
Except where prefixed with a letter, postmiles were measured on the road as it was in 1964, based on the alignment that existed at the time, and do not necessarily reflect current mileage. Postmile prefixes include: R reflecting a realignment in the route since then, M indicating a second realignment, L referring to an overlap due to a correction or change, and T indicating postmiles classified as temporary. Segments that remain unconstructed or have been relinquished to local control may be omitted. The entire route is in San Bernardino County.

Location	Postmile	Destinations	Notes
Yucca Valley	0.00	Joshua Lane	Continuation beyond SR 62
Yucca Valley	0.00	SR 62 (Twentynine Palms Highway) to I-10 – Twentynine Palms, Morongo Valley	South end of SR 247
Lucerne Valley	44.86	Old Woman Springs Road, Barstow Road to SR 18 – Big Bear Lake, Victorville	
	73.18	Stoddard Wells Road	
Barstow	78.10	I-15 (Mojave Freeway) – San Bernardino, Las Vegas, Needles	Interchange; north end of SR 247; I-15 exit 183
Barstow	78.10	Barstow Road	Continuation beyond I-15; serves Barstow Community Hospital
1.000 mi = 1.609 km; 1.000 km = 0.621 mi
