= California State Route 95 =

Two highways, none of which were designated as only a state route, in the U.S. state of California have been signed as Route 95:

- U.S. Route 95 in California
- California State Route 95 (1934), now part of US 395

== See also ==
- Arizona State Route 95
