= Vidal Junction, California =

Unincorporated community in California, United States

- Unincorporated community
- Location in California Vidal Junction, California (the United States)
- Coordinates: 34°11′20″N 114°34′26″W
- Country: United States
- State: California
- County: San Bernardino
- Time zone: UTC-8 (Pacific (PST))
  - Summer (DST): UTC-7 (PDT)
- ZIP codes: 92280
- Area code: 760

Vidal Junction is an unincorporated community in the Sonoran Desert in San Bernardino County, California, United States.

It is near the California/Arizona state line immediately west of Parker at the intersection of U.S. Route 95 and State Route 62 a short distance north of Vidal.

Vidal Junction serves as a roadside stop for travelers using U.S. Route 95 and State Route 62. The community is also the site of the California Department of Food and Agriculture's Vidal Border Protection Station.

== Geography ==
Vidal Junction is located in the eastern Mojave Desert region of San Bernardino County near the Arizona state line. The community lies north of Vidal and west of Parker, Arizona, at the junction of U.S. Route 95 and California State Route 62.

The surrounding area is characterized by arid desert terrain and is included within the Vidal Junction quadrangle mapped by the United States Geological Survey.

== Transportation ==
Vidal Junction takes its name from its location at the intersection of U.S. Route 95 and California State Route 62. The junction serves as a transportation crossroads connecting southeastern California with Parker, Arizona, the lower Colorado River region, and communities farther north along U.S. Route 95.
