= U.S. Route 95 in California =

Highway in California

U.S. Route 95
- US 95 highlighted in red

Route information
- Maintained by Caltrans
- Length: 116.721 mi (187.844 km) Length does not reflect the distance along I-10 and I-40 overlaps.
- Existed: 1930s–present

Major junctions
- South end: I-10 / US 95 at the Arizona state line in Ehrenberg, AZ
- I-10 in Blythe; SR 62 in Vidal Junction; I-40 in Needles
- North end: US 95 at the Nevada state line south of Cal-Nev-Ari, NV

Location
- Country: United States
- State: California
- Counties: Riverside, San Bernardino

Highway system
- United States Numbered Highway System; List; Special; Divided; State highways in California; Interstate; US; State; Scenic; History; Pre‑1964; Unconstructed; Deleted; Freeways
← SR 94	→ SR 96

U.S. Route 95 (US 95) is a United States Numbered Highway, stretching from the Mexican border in San Luis, Arizona to the Canadian border near Eastport, Idaho. The California portion of US 95 traverses through the far eastern edges of both Riverside and San Bernardino counties. US 95 serves Blythe and Needles and junctions with SR 62 at Vidal Junction.

The route overlaps with two Interstate highways, specifically I-10 near Blythe and I-40 near Needles.

== Route description ==
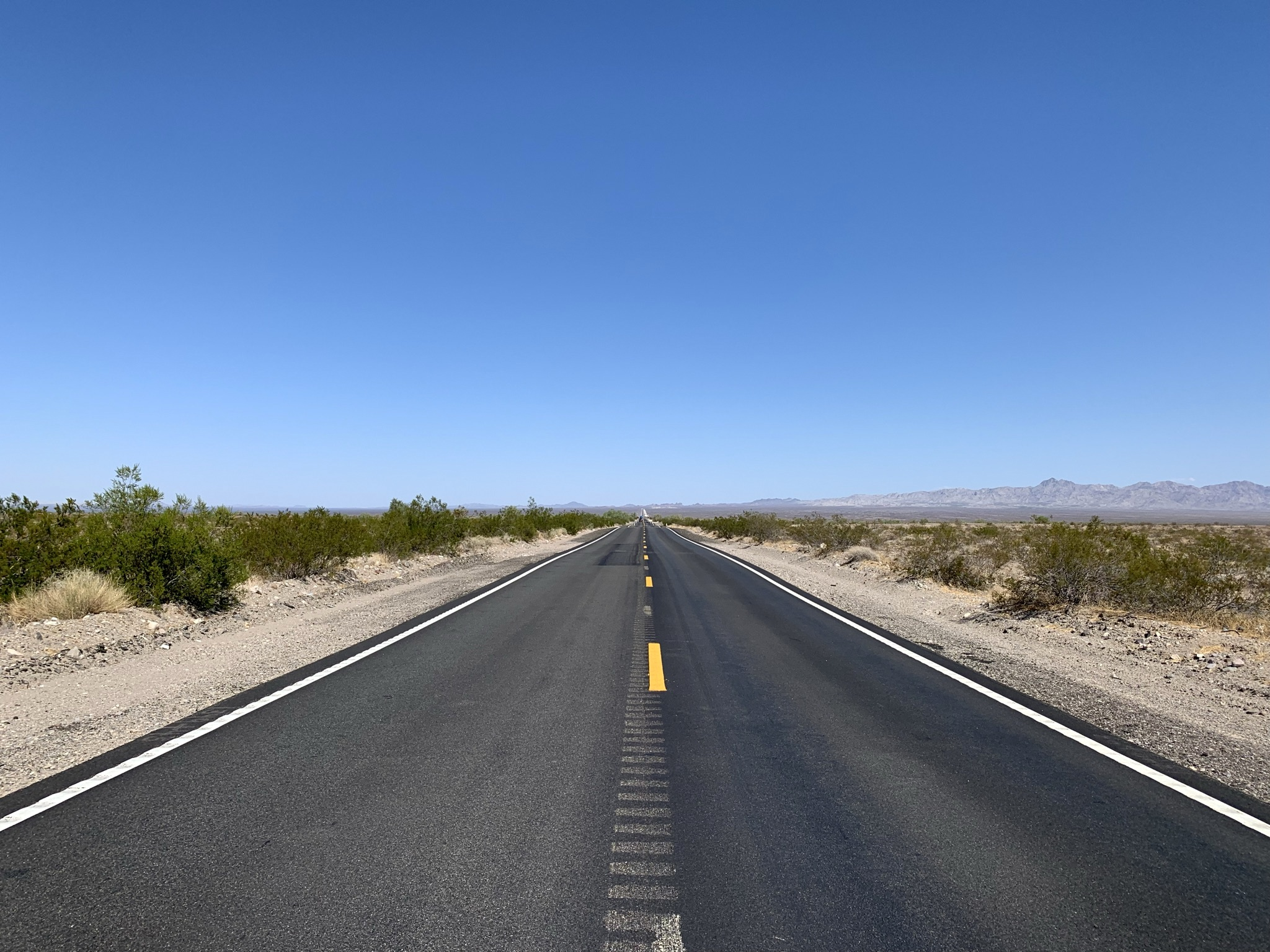
Driving north on Route 95 between Vidal Junction and Needles

The entire length of US 95 in California is defined in section 395 of the California Streets and Highways Code as simply Route 95:

Route 95 is from:
(a) Route 10 near Blythe to Route 40 near Needles.
(b) Route 40 west of Needles northerly to the Nevada state line.

The definition omits Route 95's concurrencies with Routes 10 and 40 instead of duplicating those segments in the other routes' definitions in the code. These concurrencies are included in the American Association of State Highway and Transportation Officials (AASHTO)'s U.S. Route logs of US 95.

US 95, running concurrently with I-10, crosses the Colorado River from the state of Arizona and enters the city of Blythe. The highway exits I-10 at Intake Boulevard and turns due north, leaving the city limits. A few miles north, US 95 turns northeast to parallel the Colorado River. The route passes through the Big Maria Mountains and the Riverside Mountains before entering San Bernardino County.

Upon entering San Bernardino County, US 95 turns away from the Colorado River, heading northwest towards Vidal Junction, the junction with SR 62 in the Vidal Valley. The highway continues north through the Chemehuevi Valley and the Chemehuevi Mountains before entering the city of Needles after several miles. After passing the Needles Municipal Airport, US 95 merges onto I-40 westbound and continues through Needles on the freeway. US 95 exits from I-40 west of Needles and continues northwest to Searchlight Junction, where US 95 continues north at the junction with the old routing of US 66. The highway continues north, east of Homer Mountain, to the Nevada state line.

US 95 is part of the California Freeway and Expressway System, and a small portion near I-10 and the portion north of I-40 are part of the National Highway System, a network of highways that are considered essential to the country's economy, defense, and mobility by the Federal Highway Administration. US 95 is eligible for the State Scenic Highway System, but it is not officially designated as a scenic highway by the California Department of Transportation.

== History ==
Route 146 was designated by the California State Legislature in 1933 and contained the portion from Blythe to the Nevada state line. US 95 was extended south from its routing in Idaho by AASHO through Searchlight and Needles to Blythe on June 28, 1939; the routing became effective at the start of 1940. In the 1964 state highway renumbering, the law was changed to reflect the designation as US 95.

== Major intersections ==
Except where prefixed with a letter, postmiles were measured on the road as it was in 1964, based on the alignment that existed at the time, and do not necessarily reflect current mileage. Postmile prefixes include: R reflecting a realignment in the route since then, M indicating a second realignment, L referring to an overlap due to a correction or change, and T indicating postmiles classified as temporary. Segments that remain unconstructed or have been relinquished to local control may be omitted. The numbers reset at county lines; the start and end postmiles in each county are given in the county column.

County	Location	Postmile	Exit	Destinations	Notes
Colorado River		R156.49 (Note: Indicates that the postmile represents the distance along I-10 rather than US 95.)		I-10 east / US 95 south – Phoenix, Yuma	Continuation into Ehrenberg, Arizona
Colorado River		R156.49	California–Arizona line		
Riverside; RIV R156.49-36.20	Blythe	R156.10	Agricultural Inspection Station (northbound only)		
Riverside; RIV R156.49-36.20	Blythe	R156.10	243 (Note: Exit numbers follow I-10 rather than US 95.)	Riviera Drive / I-10 BL west	Southbound exit and entrance only; northbound exit and entrance replaced by exit 242; I-10 BL is former US 60 west
Riverside; RIV R156.49-36.20	Blythe		242	E. Hobson Way (I-10 BL)	Northbound exit and entrance only
Riverside; RIV R156.49-36.20	Blythe	R154.16 L0.16	North end of freeway on I-10		
Riverside; RIV R156.49-36.20	Blythe	R154.16 L0.16		I-10 west – Indio	North end of I-10 overlap; I-10 exit 241
Riverside; RIV R156.49-36.20	Blythe	L0.39 0.00		Hobsonway (I-10 BL) – Blythe	Former US 60
San Bernardino; SBD 0.00-80.45	Vidal Junction	9.68		SR 62 – Twentynine Palms, Parker, Lake Havasu City, London Bridge	
San Bernardino; SBD 0.00-80.45	Needles			Five Mile Road (Historic US 66 east) to I-40 – Topock, Kingman	South end of Historic US 66 overlap
San Bernardino; SBD 0.00-80.45	Needles	57.28 R143.76 (Note: Indicates that the postmile represents the distance along I-40 rather than US 95.)		Historic US 66 west (E. Broadway / I-40 BL west)	North end of Historic US 66 overlap; south end of I-40 overlap; I-40 exit 144
San Bernardino; SBD 0.00-80.45	Needles	57.28 R143.76		I-40 east – Kingman, Lake Havasu City	North end of Historic US 66 overlap; south end of I-40 overlap; I-40 exit 144
San Bernardino; SBD 0.00-80.45	Needles	57.28 R143.76	South end of freeway on I-40		
San Bernardino; SBD 0.00-80.45	Needles	R142.37	142 (Note: Exit numbers follow I-40 rather than US 95.)	J Street – Downtown	
San Bernardino; SBD 0.00-80.45	Needles	R141.01	141	W. Broadway (I-40 BL east) / River Road (Historic US 66)	Former US 66
San Bernardino; SBD 0.00-80.45	Needles	R139.11	139	River Road Cutoff	Southbound exit and northbound entrance; former US 66 east
San Bernardino; SBD 0.00-80.45		R132.73 R57.21	North end of freeway on I-40		
San Bernardino; SBD 0.00-80.45		R132.73 R57.21		I-40 west – Barstow	Interchange; north end of I-40 overlap; I-40 exit 133
San Bernardino; SBD 0.00-80.45		63.94		Goffs Road (CR 66 west) – Goffs	Eastern terminus of CR 66; former US 66 west
San Bernardino; SBD 0.00-80.45		80.45		US 95 north – Searchlight, Las Vegas	Continuation into Nevada
1.000 mi = 1.609 km; 1.000 km = 0.621 mi: Concurrency terminus; Incomplete access

== See also ==
- California State Route 95

U.S. Route 95
Previous state: Arizona	California	Next state: Nevada
