= List of Interstate Highways in California =

Interstate Highways in California
- Highway shields for I-5, I-580, and I-80 Bus. Loop
- Interstate Highways highlighted in red; related state routes in purple

System information
- Maintained by Caltrans
- Length: 2,466.744 mi (3,969.840 km)

Highway names
- Interstates: Interstate XX (I-XX)
- Business Loop: Interstate XX Business Loop (I-XX Bus.)

System links
- State highways in California; Interstate; US; State; Scenic; History; Pre‑1964; Unconstructed; Deleted; Freeways

This is a list of Interstate Highways in the U.S. state of California that have existed since the 1964 renumbering. It includes routes defined by the California State Legislature but never built, as well as routes entirely relinquished to local governments.

Each state highway in California is maintained by the California Department of Transportation (Caltrans) and is assigned a Route (officially State Highway Route) number in the Streets and Highways Code (Sections 300-635). Under the code, the state assigns a unique Route X to each highway and does not differentiate between state, US, or Interstate highways.

== Overview ==
- U.S. Routes and state highways that traverse California are also defined in the California Streets and Highways code as state routes. This list does not include these state routes as they are listed separately.
- A few cases exist, such as I-110, where a defined California State Route partially overlaps with a federally defined Interstate Highway, while the remaining portion is signed as a state highway. This table only addresses the portion signed as an Interstate in these cases.
- One Interstate Highway—I-305—is defined only federally; the state calls it part of US 50. It was signed as part of Business Interstate 80, the only state-maintained Interstate business route in California.
- Conversely, a few segments exist that are not part of a federally defined Interstate Highway but are still signed as such by Caltrans. Examples include I-80's westernmost segment between US 101 and the Bay Bridge.
- Lengths for each state route were initially measured as they existed during the 1964 state highway renumbering (or during the year the route was established, if after 1964), and do not necessarily reflect the current mileage.
- The years listed reflect when the route was affected by legislative action, this is not necessarily the same year as the actual construction or signing changes to the route.
- Concurrencies are not explicitly codified in the Streets and Highways Code; such highway segments are listed on only one of the corresponding legislative route numbers. For example, the I-80/I-580 concurrency, known as the Eastshore Freeway, is only listed under Route 80 in the highway code while the definition of Route 580 is broken into non-contiguous segments. When a highway is broken into such segments, the total length recorded by Caltrans only reflects those non-contiguous segments and does not include those overlaps that would be required to make the route continuous. Furthermore, Caltrans may not sign all concurrencies, and instead may only post the highway shields for the route with the contiguous segment in the code.
- Some highways are not contiguous as the state has relinquished control of small sections to local governments. The stated length of the highway may or may not reflect the portions under local control.

== Primary Interstates ==
Number	Length (mi) (Note: Lengths rounded to the nearest mile or one-mile are estimated from various sources including Google Maps.)	Length (km)	Southern or western terminus	Northern or eastern terminus	Formed	Removed	Notes
I-5	796.432	1,281.733	Mexican border in San Ysidro, San Diego	I-5 at the Oregon state line	1947	current	
I-5E	—	—	I-5 near Tracy	I-5 near Dunnigan	1957	1970	Former designation of I-5 when I-5W existed
I-5W	—	—	I-5 near Tracy	I-5 near Dunnigan	1957	1970	Former designation of I-580 and I-505
I-7	302	486	I-5 at Wheeler Ridge	I-5 in Stockton	proposed	—	Caltrans has proposed I-7 or I-9 for SR 99 in central California
I-8	171.98	276.77	Nimitz Boulevard, Sunset Cliffs Boulevard in San Diego	I-8 at the Arizona state line	1964	current	Westernmost segment between Nimitz Boulevard/Sunset Cliffs Boulevard and I-5 is not officially recognized as an Interstate by the FHWA
I-9	302	486	I-5 at Wheeler Ridge	I-5 in Stockton	proposed	—	Caltrans has proposed I-7 or I-9 for SR 99 in central California
I-10	243.31 (Note: This route is broken into pieces, and the length does not reflect the overlaps that would be required to make the route continuous.)	391.57	SR 1 in Santa Monica	I-10 at the Arizona state line	1947	current	Route 10, as defined by the state, is broken into two segments at the East Los Angeles Interchange; traffic is directed via I-5 to connect the two; the portion between I-5 and US 101 not signed
I-15	287.26 (Note: Part of one of the contiguous routes that is partially signed as an Interstate Highway, while the remaining segment is signed as a state highway.)	462.30	I-8 in San Diego	I-15 at the Nevada state line	1957	current	
I-15E	—	—	I-15 in Temecula	I-15 in Devore, California	1973	1982	Renumbered from I-215 in 1973 and back to I-215 in 1982
I-15W	—	—	I-15 in Murrieta	I-15 in Devore, California	1972	1974	Temporary Signage along current I-15
I-40	154.623	248.842	I-15 in Barstow	I-40 at the Arizona state line	1947	current	
I-80	205.07	330.03	US 101 in San Francisco	I-80 at the Nevada state line	1947	current	Westernmost segment between US 101 and the Bay Bridge is not officially recognized as an Interstate by the FHWA
Former; Proposed and unbuilt

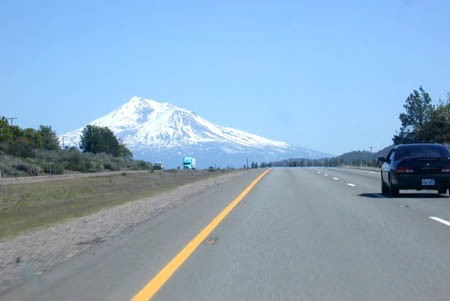
I-5 southbound approaching Mount Shasta

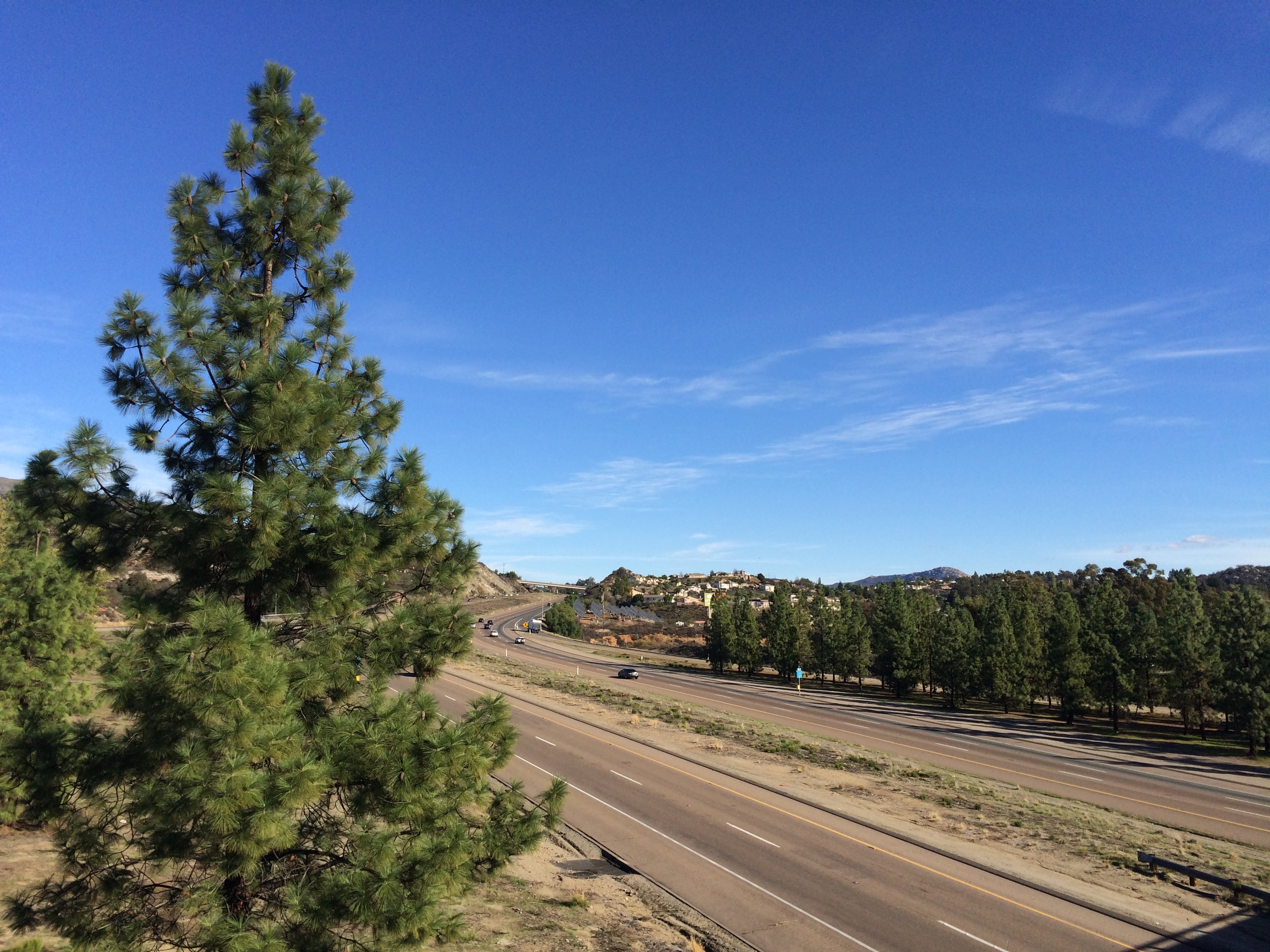
I-8 in Alpine

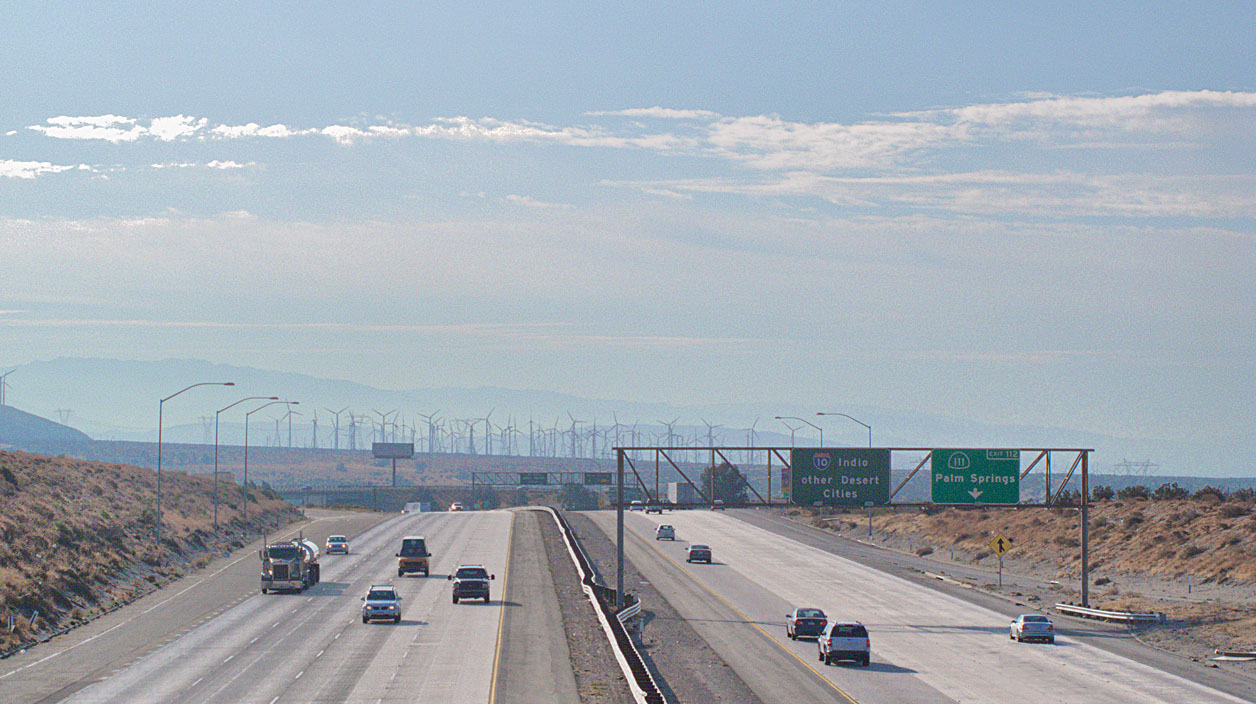
I-10 eastbound with the San Gorgonio Pass wind farm in the background

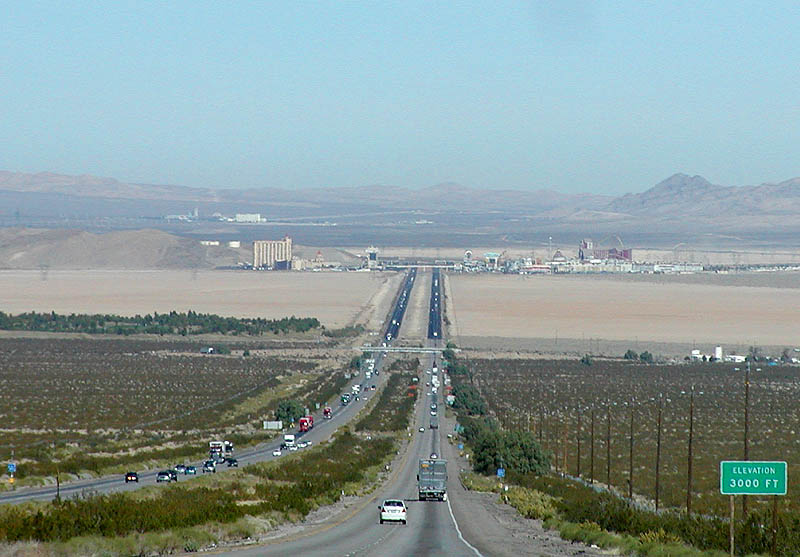
I-15 northbound descending into the Ivanpah Valley towards Primm, Nevada at the California-Nevada state line

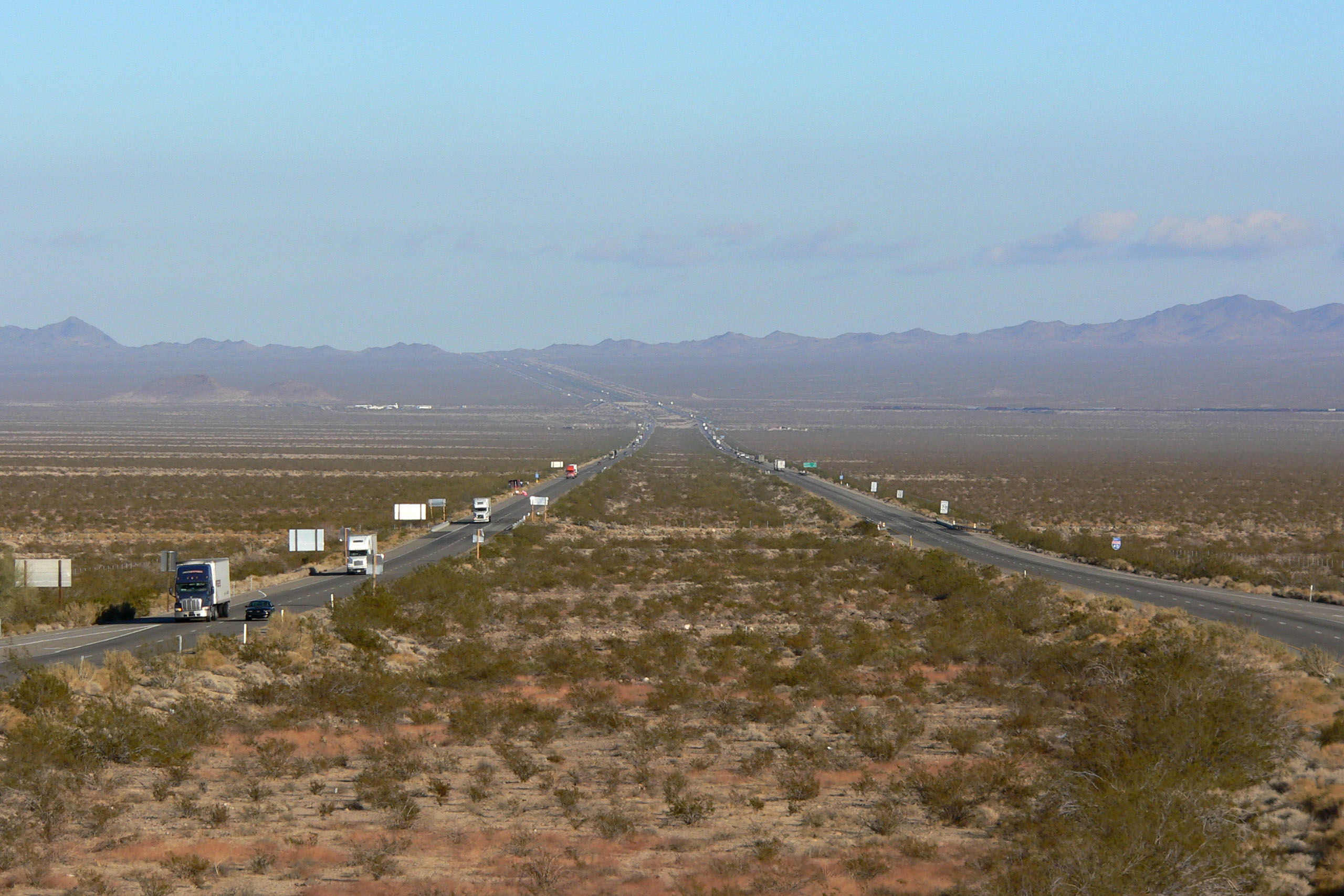
I-40 eastbound near Fenner

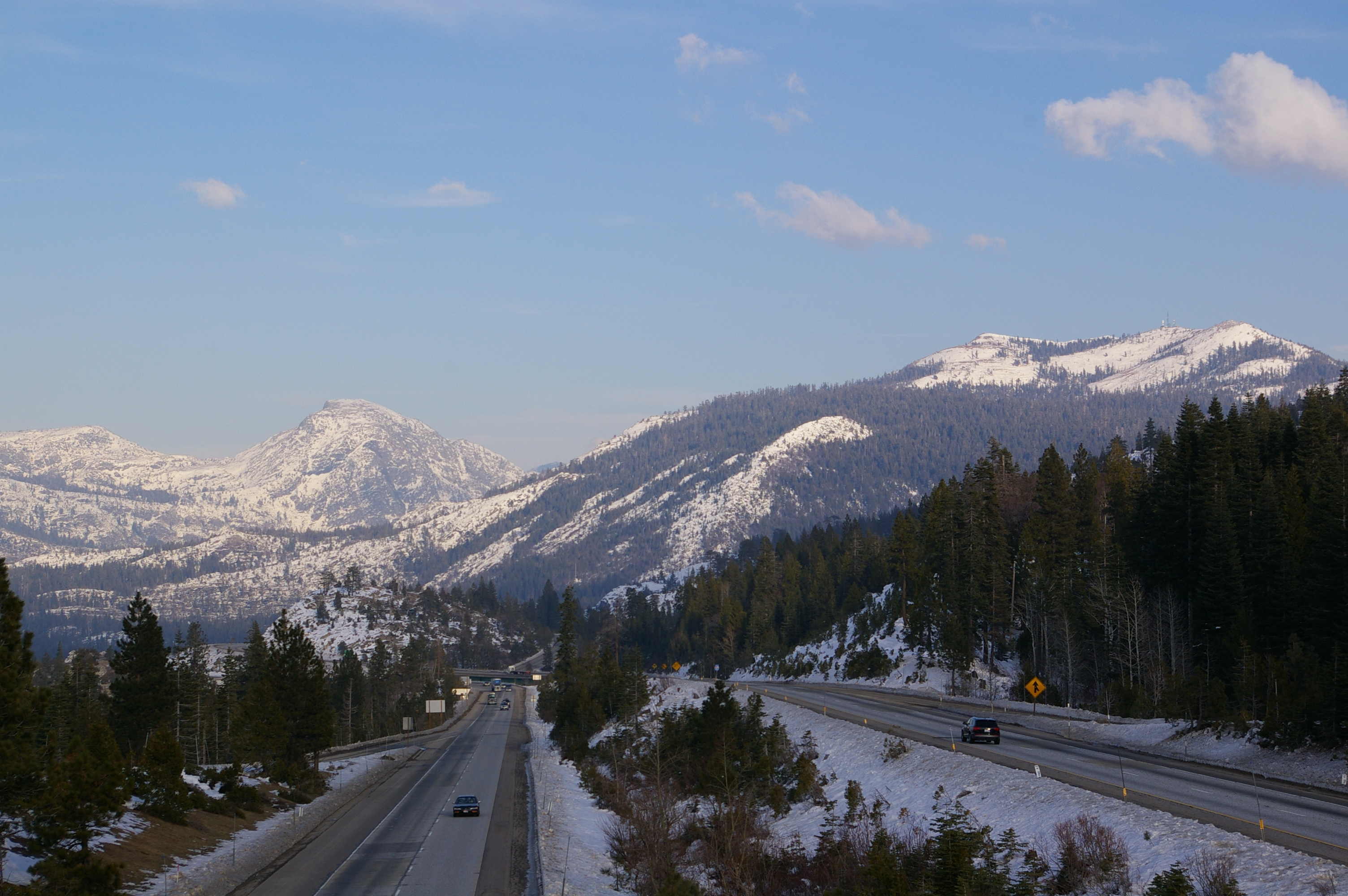
I-80 eastbound in the Sierra Nevada from the Yuba Gap overpass towards the western approach to Donner Summit

== Auxiliary Interstates ==
Number	Length (mi)	Length (km)	Southern or western terminus	Northern or eastern terminus	Formed	Removed	Notes
I-105	18.82	30.29	SR 1 in El Segundo	I-605 in Norwalk	1982	current	Right-of-way formerly planned as part of SR 42
I-105	—	—	I-5 in East Los Angeles	US 101 in Los Angeles	1964	1968	Renumbered as US 101; part of East Los Angeles Interchange
I-110	23.73	38.19	SR 47 in San Pedro	I-10 in Los Angeles	1978	current	Former routing of US 6/SR 11
I-110	—	—	I-10/I-5 in East Los Angeles	US 101 in Los Angeles	1964	1968	Deleted from highway system; part of East Los Angeles Interchange
I-180	—	—	US 101 in San Rafael	I-80 in Berkeley	1981	1991	Former designation of I-580
I-205	12.973	20.878	I-580 near Tracy	I-5 near Manteca	1970	current	Formerly part of US 50
I-210	44.90	72.26	I-5 in Los Angeles	SR 57 in Glendora	1964	current	Entire length of SR 210 to be renumbered to I-210. SR 57 from I-10 to I-210/SR 210 is an unsigned designation of I-210 used by the FHWA and AASHTO
I-215	55.060	88.610	I-15 in Murrieta	I-15 in San Bernardino	1982	current	Formerly I-15E and SR 215
I-238	2.126	3.421	I-580 in Castro Valley	I-880 in San Leandro	1983	current	Technically a spur of I-80; only violation in the Interstate system
I-280	57.510	92.553	US 101/I-680 in San Jose	King and 5th Streets in San Francisco	1955	current	
I-305	5.64	9.08	I-80 in West Sacramento	SR 99 in Sacramento	1981	current	Unsigned designation used by the FHWA and the AASHTO; signed as part of US 50
I-380	1.67	2.69	I-280 in San Bruno	US 101 in South San Francisco	1964	current	Formerly proposed to be extended west to SR 1 and east along the Southern Crossing to I-880
I-405	72.415	116.541	I-5 in Irvine	I-5 near San Fernando	1964	current	
I-480	—	—	US 101 in San Francisco	I-80 in San Francisco	1957	1968	Demoted to state highway in 1968
I-505	32.99	53.09	I-80 in Vacaville	I-5 near Dunnigan	1977	current	Formerly part of I-5W
I-580	75.550	121.586	US 101 in San Rafael	I-5 near Tracy	1947	current	Various segments formerly part of US 50, I-5W or SR 17
I-605	27.40	44.10	I-405/SR 22 in Seal Beach	I-210 in Irwindale	1964	current	
I-680	70.536	113.517	US 101/I-280 in San Jose	I-80 in Fairfield	1976	current	Formerly part of SR 21
I-710	24.249 (Note: This route is broken into pieces due to a gap in the description, unfilled by any route.)	39.025	SR 47 in Long Beach	Valley Boulevard in Alhambra	1984	current	Formerly part of SR 7. The portions north of I-10 and south of SR 1 are not officially recognized as Interstates by the FHWA
I-780	6.759	10.878	I-80 in Vallejo	I-680 in Benicia	1976	current	Formerly part of I-680
I-805	28.016	45.087	I-5 in San Ysidro, San Diego	I-5 in Sorrento Valley, San Diego	1959	current	
I-880	45.698	73.544	I-280/SR 17 in San Jose	I-80/I-580 in Oakland	1984	current	Formerly part of SR 17
I-880	21.2	34.1	US 50 in West Sacramento	I-80 in Sacramento	1971	1983	Now part of I-80
I-905	8.964	14.426	I-5 in San Diego	Mexican border near Otay Mesa	proposed	—	Currently SR 905
I-980	2.027	3.262	I-880 in Oakland	I-580/SR 24 in Oakland	1981	current	Right-of-way formerly part of SR 24
Former; Proposed and unbuilt

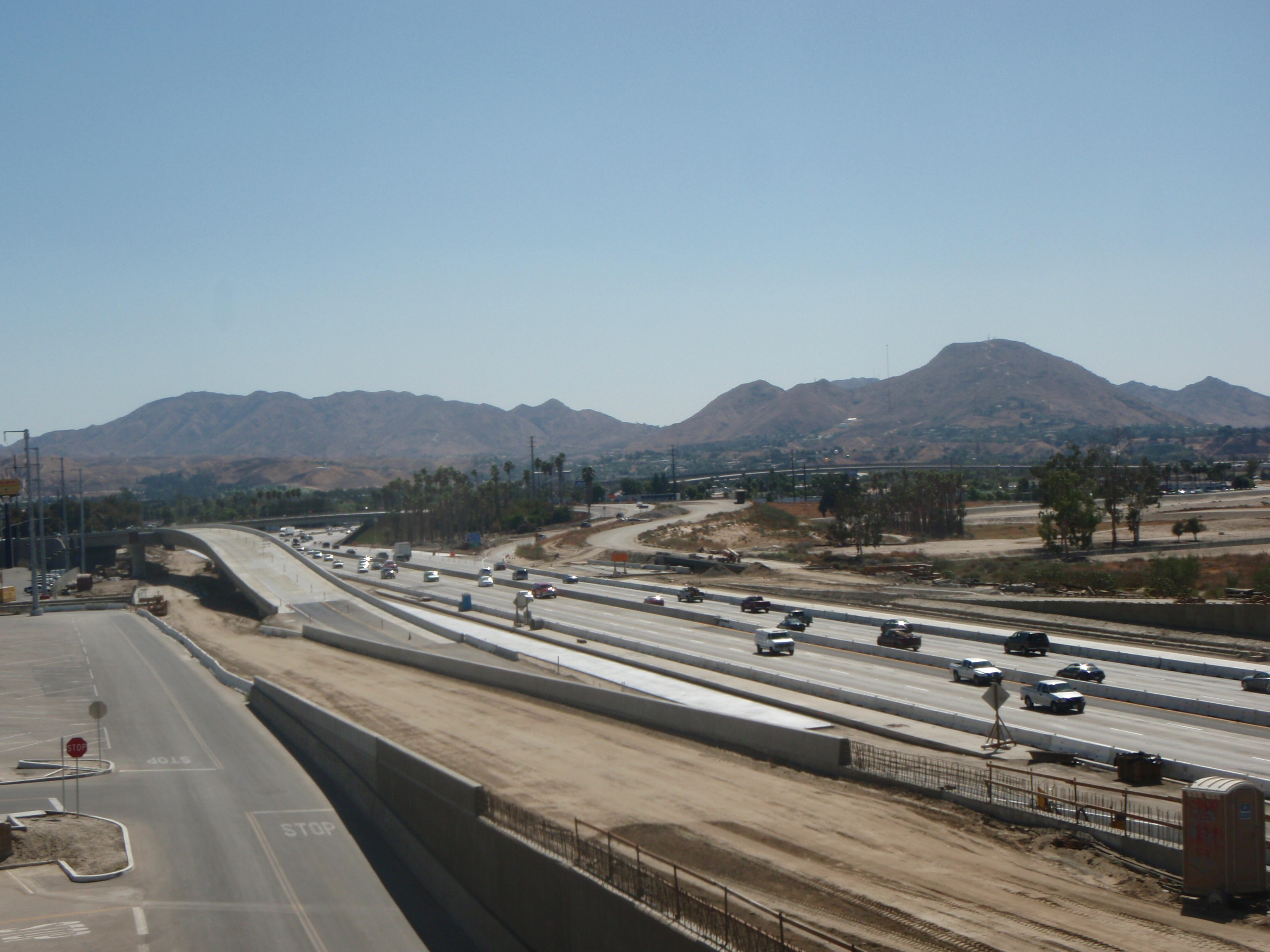
Construction on I-215 between Inland Center Drive and Orange Show Road in San Bernardino

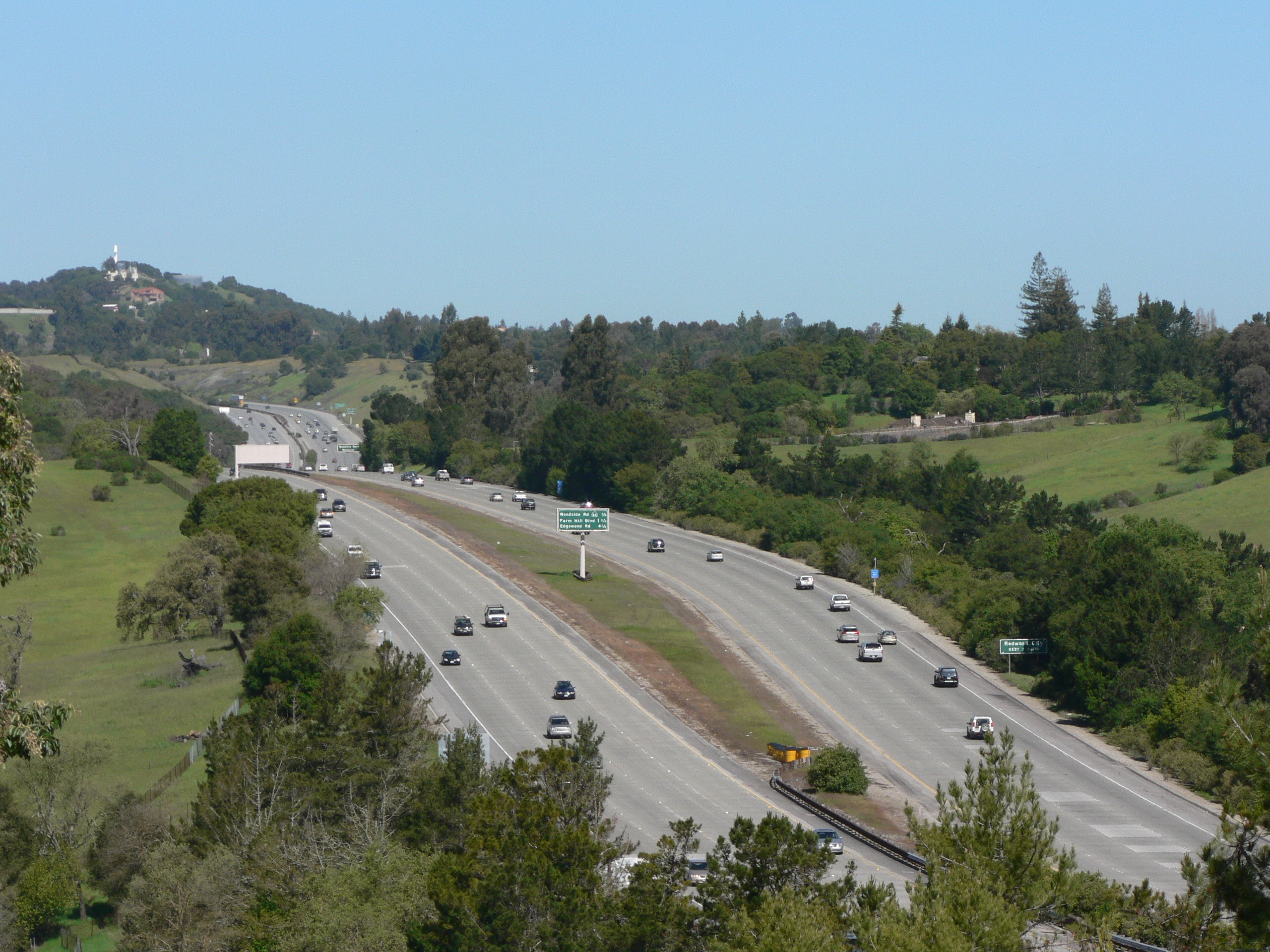
I-280 running along near Stanford University

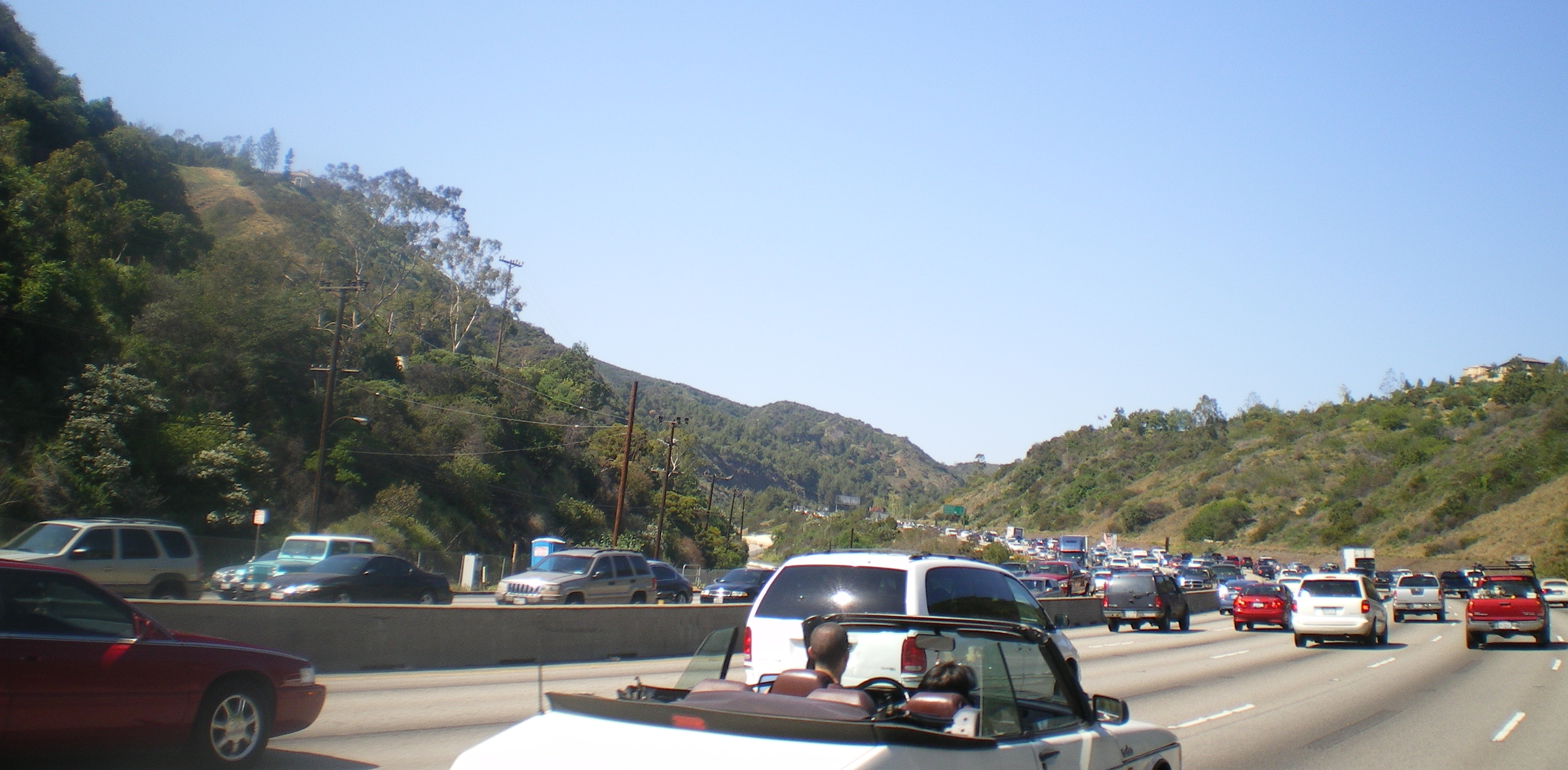
Cars driving on I-405 through the Sepulveda Pass

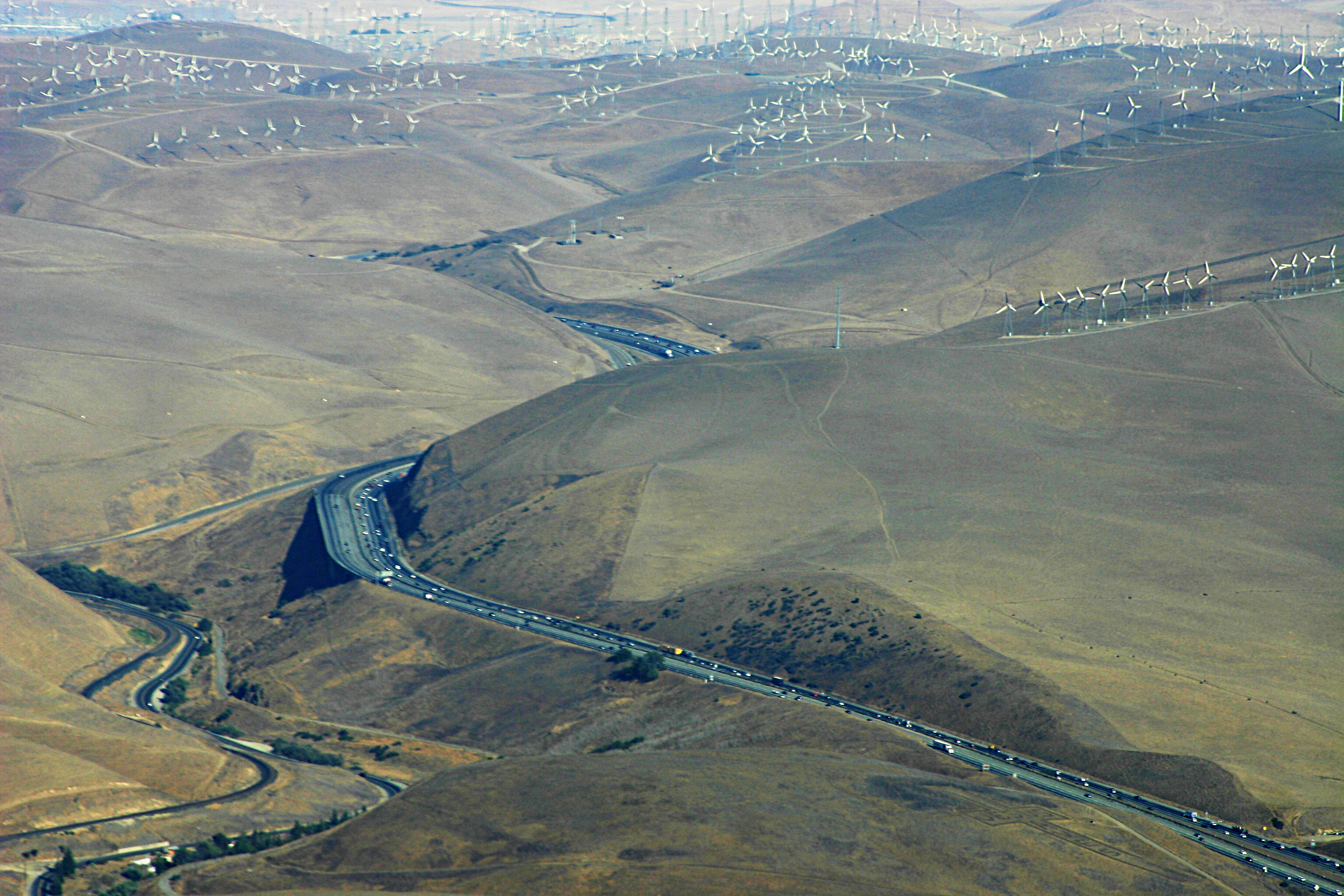
I-580 winding through the Altamont Pass wind farm

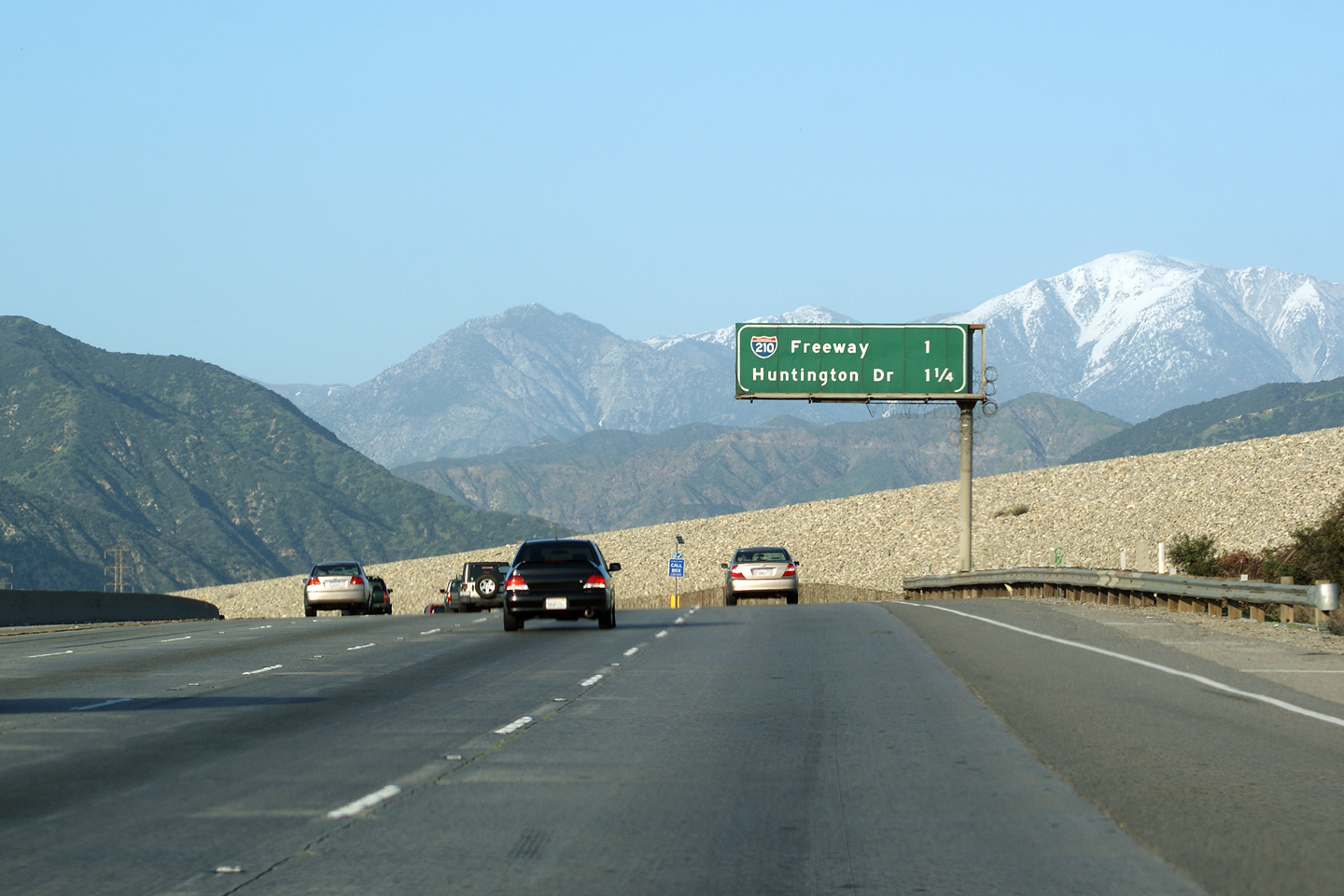
I-605 northbound approaching its northern terminus with I-210

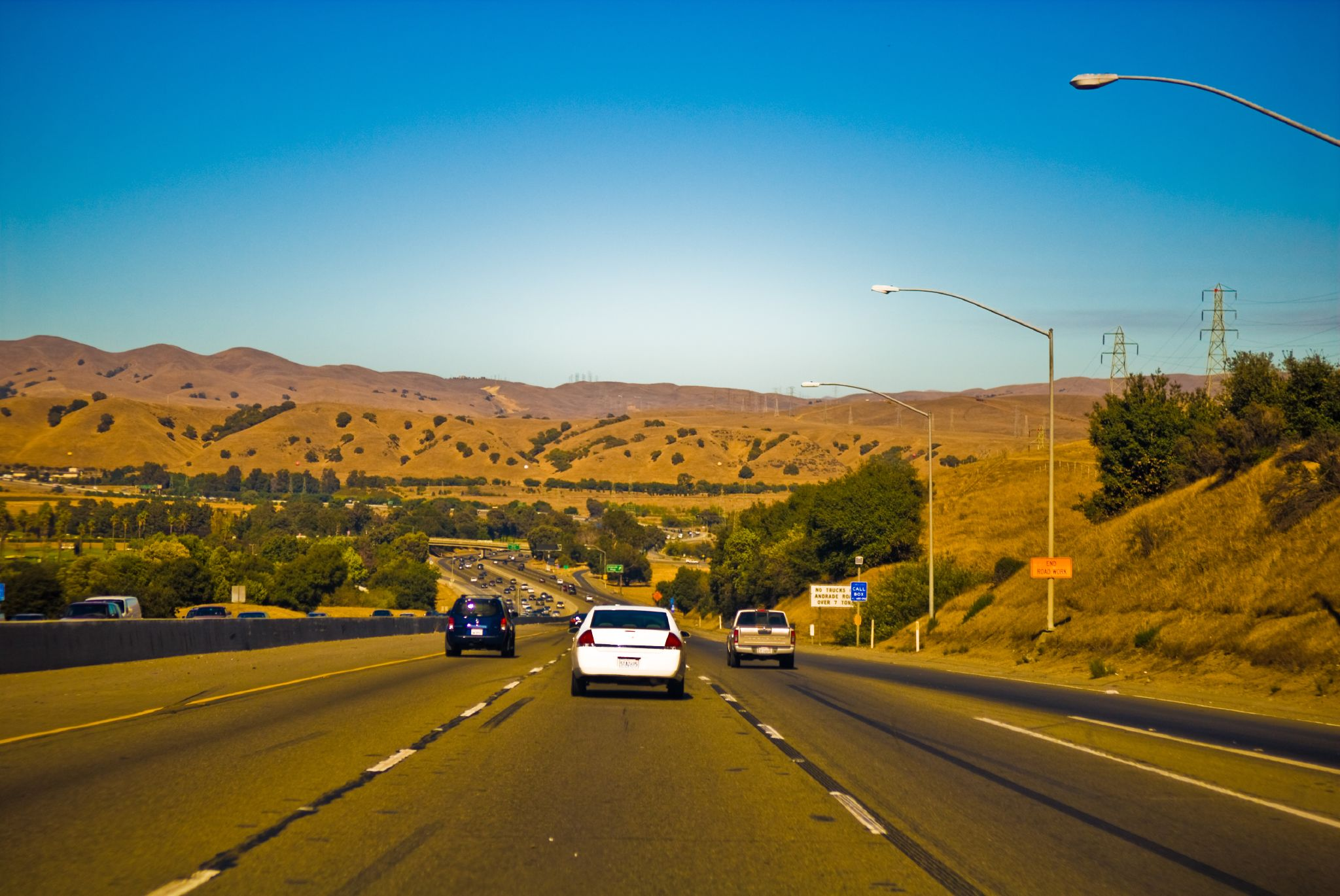
I-680 northbound descending from Mission Pass

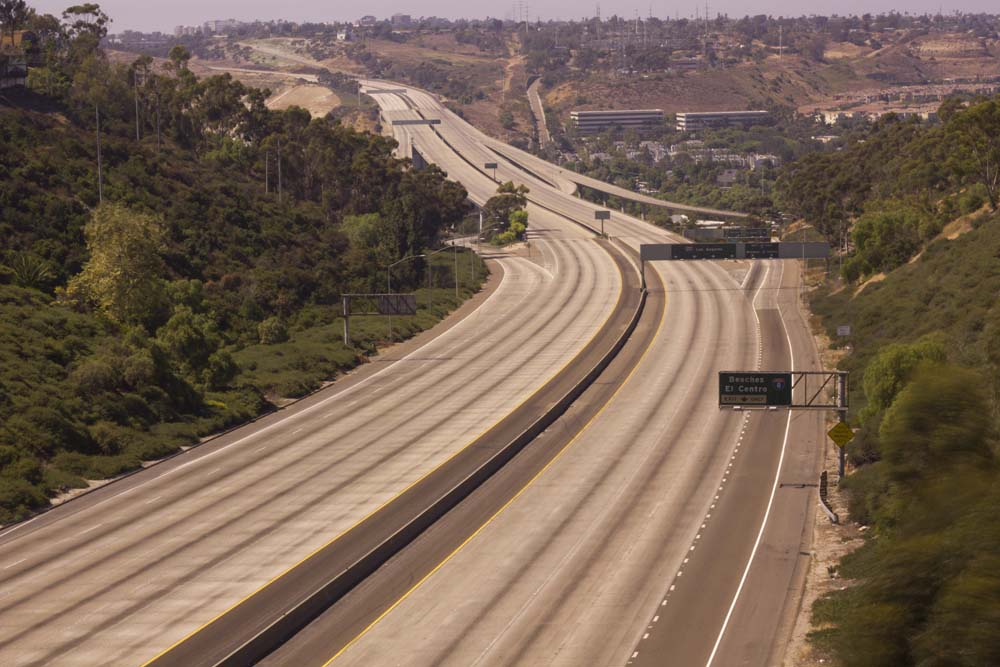
An empty I-805 at its interchange with I-8 in San Diego's Mission Valley

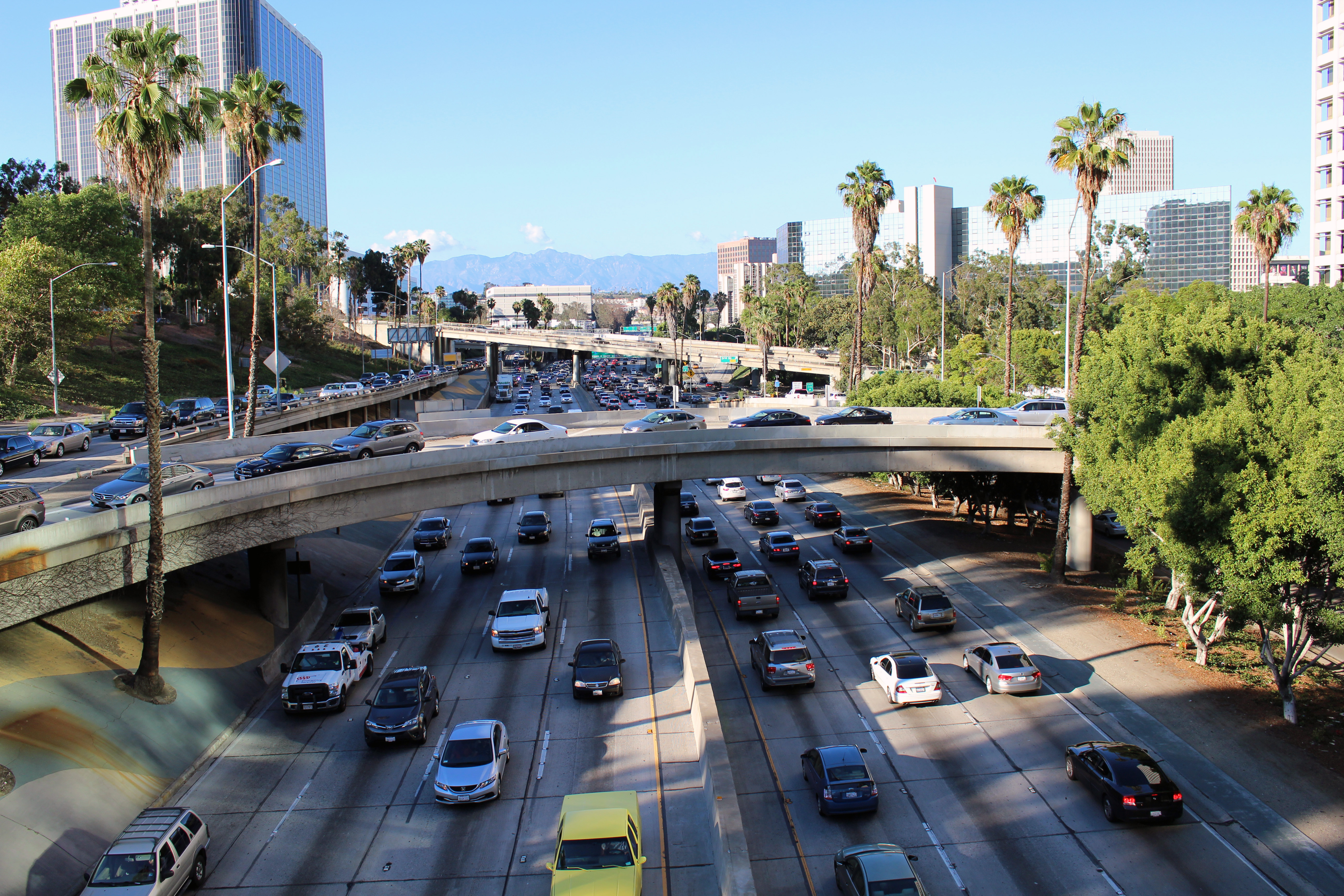
Rush hour on I-110 in Los Angeles

== Business Routes ==
Interstate business routes in California are assigned by the California Department of Transportation (Caltrans), but are not maintained by Caltrans unless they overlay other routes of the state highway system. Local authorities may request route assignment from the Caltrans Transportation System Information Program, and all requests require approval of the executive committee of the American Association of State Highway and Transportation Officials (AASHTO).

Number	Length (mi)	Length (km)	Southern or western terminus	Northern or eastern terminus	Formed	Removed	Notes
I-5 BL	—	—	I-5 in San Ysidro	I-5 in Chula Vista	c. 1960	1990	old US 101 along Beyer Boulevard, Broadway, Harbor Drive, and Pacific Highway.
I-5 BL	—	—	I-5 in San Diego	I-5 in San Diego	—	2005	old US 101 along Mission Bay Drive.
I-5 BL	—	—	I-5 in San Diego	I-5 in Oceanside	c. 1960	current	old US 101 along Coast Highway (CR S-21).
I-5 BL	—	—	I-5 in Glendale	I-5 in Granada Hills	c. 1970	1980	travels along San Fernando Road (old US 99 and US 6).
I-5 BL	—	—	I-5 in Woodland	I-5 in Woodland	c. 1970	1980	Between I-5 Exits 537 and 540.
I-5 BL	1.1	1.8	I-5 in Arbuckle	I-5 in Arbuckle	—	—	Between I-5 Exits 566 and 567.
I-5 BL	—	—	I-5 in Williams	I-5 in Maxwell	—	—	Between I-5 Exits 575 and 588.
I-5 BL	—	—	I-5 in Willows	I-5 in Orland	—	—	Between I-5 Exits 601 and 621.
I-5 BL	4.2	6.8	I-5 in Red Bluff	I-5 in Red Bluff	—	—	Between I-5 Exits 647 and 651.
I-5 BL	—	—	I-5 in Cottonwood	I-5 in Cottonwood	—	—	old US 99 between I-5 Exits 662 and 665.
I-5 BL	3.7	6.0	I-5 in Dunsmuir	I-5 in Dunsmuir	—	—	old US 99 along Dunsmuir Avenue between I-5 Exits 729 and 732.
I-5 BL	3.8	6.1	I-5 in Mount Shasta	I-5 in Mount Shasta	—	—	Between I-5 Exits 647 and 651.
I-5 BL	—	—	I-5 in Weed	I-5 in Weed	—	—	old US 99 between I-5 Exits 747 and 748.
I-5 BL	—	—	I-5 in Yreka	I-5 in Yreka	—	—	Between I-5 Exits 773 and 776.
I-8 BL	—	—	I-8 in San Diego	I-8 in La Mesa	c. 1970	1995	Between I-8 Exits 4B-C and 13A (Washington Street, Normal Street, El Cajon Boulevard)
I-8 BL	8.15	13.12	I-8 in El Cajon	I-8 in Lakeside	—	—	Between I-8 Exits 15 and 23
I-8 BL	4.25	6.84	I-8 in Alpine	I-8 in Alpine	—	—	former US 80 along Alpine Drive between I-8 Exits 30 and 33
I-8 BL	4.25	6.84	I-8 in El Centro	I-8 in El Centro	—	—	Between I-8 Exits 114 and 115
I-8 BL	2.18	3.51	I-8 in Alpine	Bus.I-8 in Yuma, AZ	—	—	Historic US 80 between I-8 Exit 170 and AZ line
I-10 BL	7.9	12.7	I-10 in Pomona	I-10 in Ontario	—	—	former US 70/US 99 between I-10 Exits 42B and 55A
I-10 BL	—	—	I-10 in Fontana	I-10 in Colton	—	—	former US 70/US 99 between I-10 Exits 59 and 71
I-10 BL	—	—	I-10 in Colton	I-10 in Coachella	—	—	former US 60/US 70/US 99 between I-10 Exits 139 and 146
I-10 BL	7.9	12.7	I-10 in Blythe	I-10 in Blythe	—	—	former US 60/US 70 between I-10 Exits 236 and 243
I-15 BL	—	—	I-15 in Escondido	I-15 in Escondido	—	—	former US 395 between I-15 Exits 28 and 34
I-15 BL	—	—	I-15 in Lake Elsinore	I-15 in Lake Elsinore	—	—	Between I-15 Exits 73 and 75
I-15 BL	—	—	I-15 in Norco	I-15 in Norco	—	—	Between I-15 Exits 98 and 100
I-15 BL	—	—	I-15 in Victorville	I-15 in Victorville	—	—	Historic US 66/US 91 between I-15 Exits 150 and 153A
I-15 BL	—	—	I-15 in Barstow	I-15 in Barstow	—	—	Historic US 66/US 91 between I-15 Exits 181 and 184B
I-15 BL	3.6	5.8	I-15 in Baker	I-15 in Baker	—	—	Old US 91/US 466 between I-15 Exits 245 and 248
I-40 BL	3.4	5.5	I-40 in Needles	I-40 in Needles	—	—	Old US 66/US 95 between I-40 Exits 141 and 145
I-80 BL	13.82	22.24	I-80 in West Sacramento	I-80 in Sacramento	c. 1980	current	Between I-80 Exits 82 and 95
I-205 BL	—	—	I-205 in Tracy	I-5 in Lathrop	—	—	Old US 50 between I-205 Exit 4 and I-5 Exit 458B
Former; Proposed and unbuilt
