= Barstow-Daggett Airport =

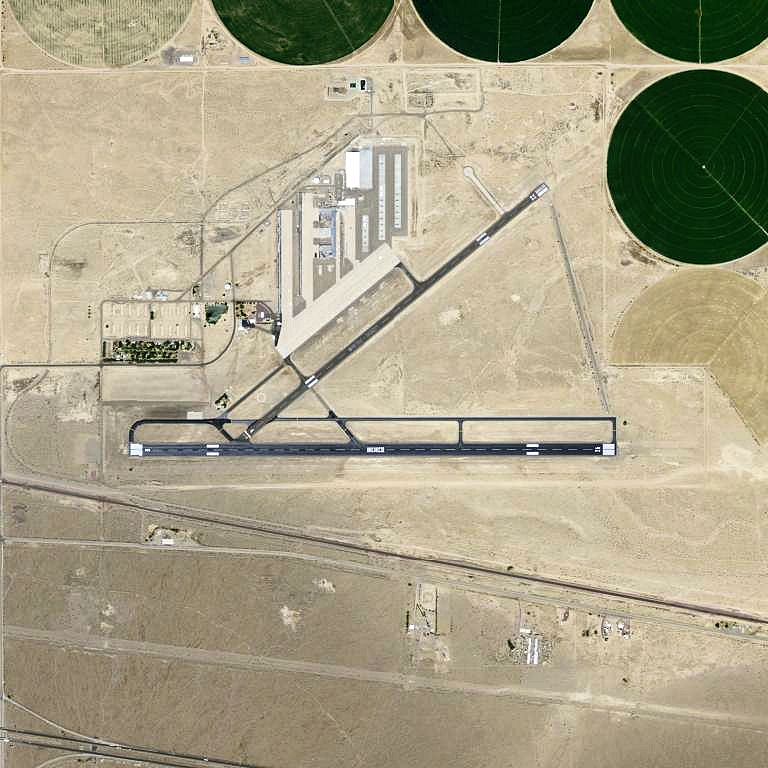
- USGS aerial image, 2006
- IATA: DAG; ICAO: KDAG; FAA LID: DAG

Summary
- Airport type: Public
- Owner: County of San Bernardino
- Serves: Barstow & Daggett, California
- Elevation AMSL: 1,930 ft (590 m)
- Coordinates: 34°51′13″N 116°47′12″W
- Website: cms.sbcounty.gov/airports/Airports/BarstowDaggett.aspx

Map
- Location of Barstow-Daggett Airport

Runways
Direction	Length		Surface
Direction	ft	m	Surface
8/26	6,402	1,951	Asphalt
4/22	5,123	1,561	Asphalt

Statistics (2006)
- Aircraft operations: 36,500
- Based aircraft: 59
- Source: Federal Aviation Administration

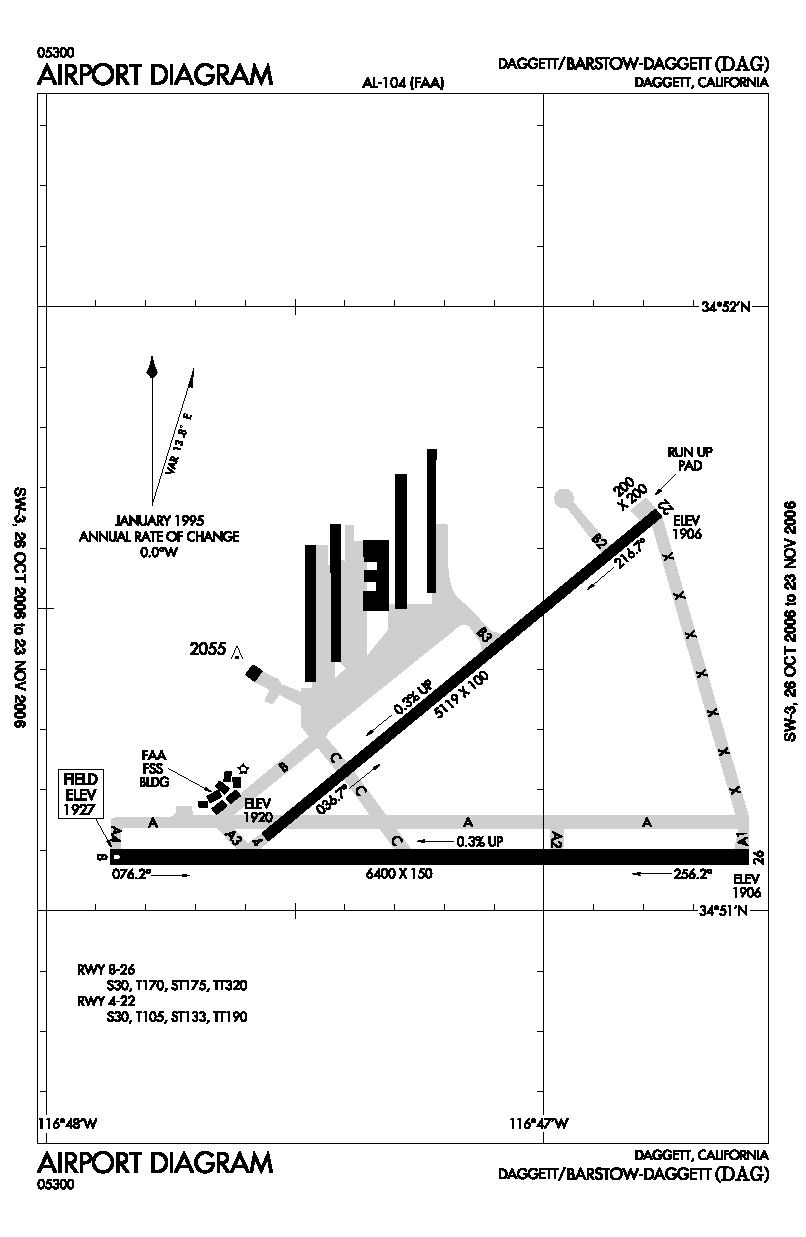

Barstow-Daggett Airport (IATA: DAG, ICAO: KDAG, FAA LID: DAG) is a county-owned public airport in San Bernardino County, California, United States. It is five miles (8 km) east of Daggett and 14 miles (23 km) east of Barstow. Built in 1933, it is the oldest of the six airports operated by San Bernardino County.

== Facilities and aircraft ==
Barstow-Daggett Airport covers 1,087 acres (440 ha) at an elevation of 1,930 feet (588 m) above mean sea level. It has two asphalt runways: 8/26 is 6,402 by 150 feet (1,951 x 46 m) and 4/22 is 5,123 by 100 feet (1,561 x 30 m).

In the year ending February 16, 2006, the airport had 36,500 aircraft operations, an average of 100 per day: 51% general aviation and 49% military. 59 aircraft were then based at this airport: 32% single-engine, 3% multi-engine, 1.7% jet, 2% helicopter, 2% ultralight and 59% military.

== History ==
Just prior to World War II, the Civil Aeronautics Administration (CAA) selected the site as an important civil air field and negotiated a standard agreement (AP 4) with the county of San Bernardino to maintain the air field. Shortly thereafter, the site was chosen by the War Department as a Modification Center. As a result, the county acquired fee interest to the additional land necessary for War Department use. On May 4, 1942, the government entered into an agreement with the county to lease the 1,099-acre (445 ha) site (renewable annually but not beyond June 30, 1967).

About May 29, 1942 the government and Douglas Aircraft Company, Inc., entered into a cost plus fixed fee ($1.00) contract (No. W-509-ENG-2557), whereby Douglas agreed to do all things necessary and incident to the procurement, furnishing, delivery and installation of equipment, machinery, machine tools, materials, supplies and facilities for proper operation of a Modification Center. Douglas established the Modification Center and operated it until the middle of 1944, when Army Air Forces deactivated the project. According to a narrative report contained in project files, there was no evidence of the lease ever having been executed, so it was believed that Douglas occupied and used the premises without any written agreement.

On November 12, 1942, the Secretary of War and Standard Oil Co. (San Francisco) entered into an agreement (unnumbered lease to run with lease W-868-ENG-4504), whereby Standard Oil agreed to install, operate, and maintain lubricating oil storage and distribution facilities at the site. In addition, on December 20, 1943, the CAA was granted a permit (to run with Lease No. W-868-ENG-4505) to use and occupy two parcels of land totaling 11.2 acres at the Modification Center for a radio range and communication building site, together with a right of way between the two parcels for establishing and maintaining subsurface cable lines. The original permit period ended June 30, 1944; however, the lease contained a provision for annual renewal, at the option of the government, through June 30, 1967. Upon the expiration of the permit, all CAA property was to have been removed to a condition satisfactory to the Commanding Office or other competent military authority.

About 65 buildings and 20 other structures were built at the facility (headquarters and flight operations buildings, hangars, barracks, sewage treatment plants, warehouses, water wells, water and fuel storage tanks, gasoline station, etc.). The total cost of government improvements was $3,924,273, with the CAA expending an additional $107,235 for various improvements. Douglas built a swimming pool, paint and dope storage shed, and an air hose station for which reimbursement was not made. According to airport personnel, improvements constructed by the county (non-DOD) consisted of one building, and the addition of a small surface water pond in the vicinity.

On September 25, 1945, Major General Willis H. Hale, Fourth Air Force, notified Daggett Army Air Field that it was temporarily inactivated.

The site (all 1,099 acres) was classified as surplus on November 15, 1945. According to the completed Declaration of Surplus Real Property Form (SPB 5, dated March 28, 1946), the improvements at the site were in good condition. Custody and accountability for the site was assumed by the War Assets Administration on June 27, 1946, with the installation immediately transferred to the Navy Department.

The San Bernardino Daily Sun reported on August 21, 1951, that the lease between the county and the Marine Corps on the Daggett Airport had been renewed by the board of supervisors on August 20.

According to airport personnel interviewed during the site visit, the county obtained control of facility from the military in 1958. However, a fire during the 1960s destroyed County records of the transaction. During 1946 through 1958 it is not clear which agency and jurisdiction over the facility. From 1958 through the present, the airport was controlled by the current owner, the county. According to Exhibit A of the original 1942 lease with the county, the government, at its option, may leave in place the alterations and improvements made to the landing areas in lieu of restoration.

Today the US Army has based several UH-60 Black Hawk helicopters and LUH-72 Lakota helicopters operating out of the airport under the Fort Irwin National Training Center aviation company which is based on Fort Irwin.

== See also ==
- California World War II Army Airfields
- Victorville Army Airfield auxiliary fields
