= Fenner, California =

Unincorporated community in California, United States

- Unincorporated community
- Location within California Location within the United States
- Coordinates: 34°48′57″N 115°10′45″W
- Country: United States
- State: California
- County: San Bernardino
- Elevation: 2,100 ft (640 m)
- Time zone: UTC-8 (Pacific (PST))
  - Summer (DST): UTC-7 (PDT)
- Area codes: 442/760
- GNIS feature ID: 1656514

Fenner is an unincorporated community in San Bernardino County, California, United States. Fenner is located along Interstate 40 32 miles (51 km) west of Needles.

Fenner was named for either Arthur Fenner or his son James, both governors of Rhode Island.

From 1942 to 1944 it was the site of a US Army training facility, Camp Clipper.
