= Transportation in Greater Los Angeles =

Transport infrstructure in the US city

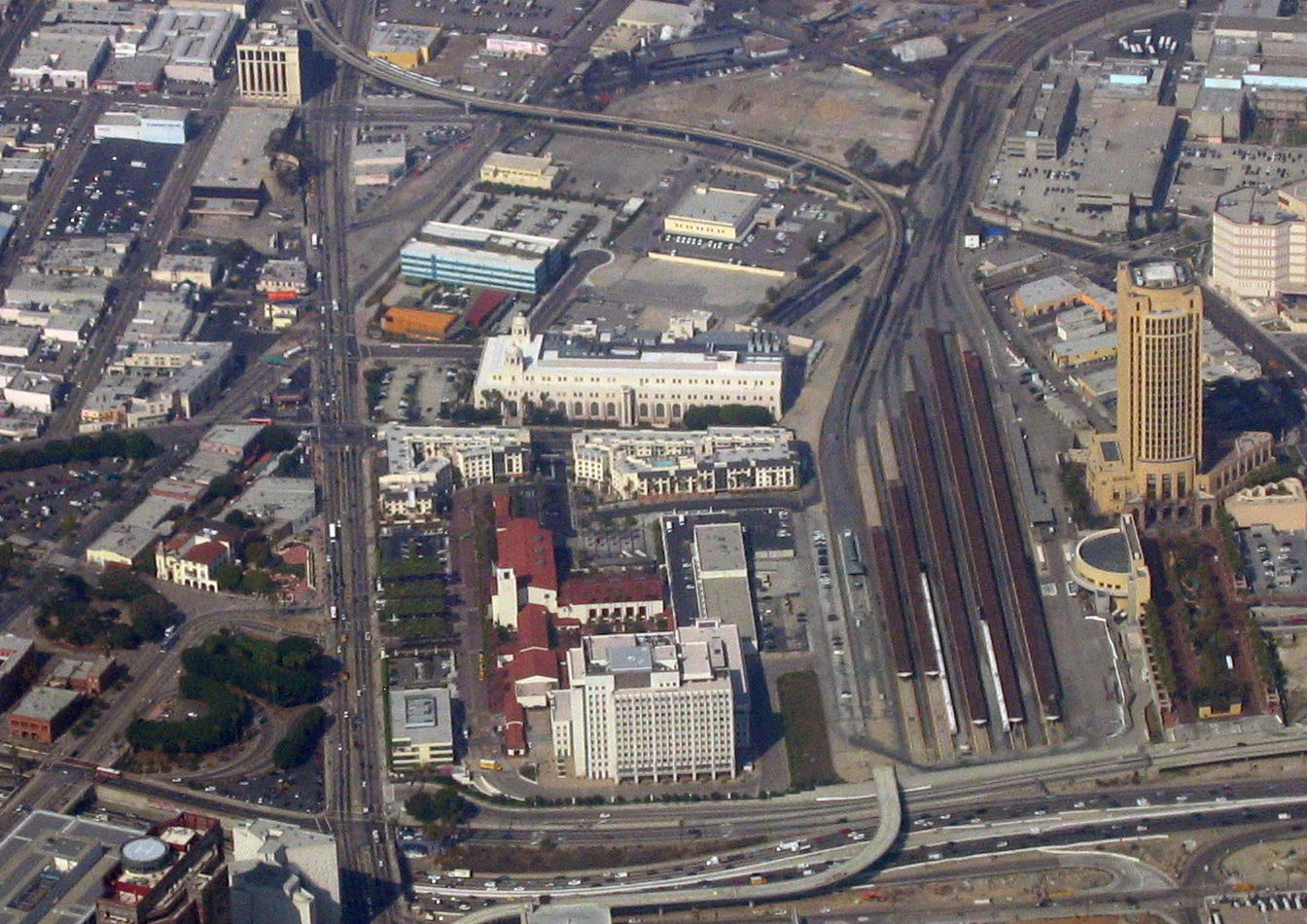
Los Angeles Union Station, hub for Los Angeles Metro rail lines and buses, Metrolink and Amtrak trains, and the Hollywood Freeway, one of Los Angeles' major thoroughfares

Greater Los Angeles has a complex multimodal transportation infrastructure, which serves as a regional, national and international hub for passenger and freight traffic. The transportation system of Greater Los Angeles includes the United States' largest port complex, seven commuter rail lines, Amtrak service, a subway system within the city of Los Angeles, and numerous highways. Los Angeles is integrated into the Interstate Highway System by Interstate 5, Interstate 10, and Interstate 15, along with numerous auxiliary highways and state routes. Bus service is also included locally within the area by numerous local government agencies. Subways and light commuter rail lines are present within Los Angeles proper, allowing mass transportation within the city. Commuter railroads are run by Metrolink. Amtrak has numerous railroad lines that connect Los Angeles to the rest of the country.

People in Los Angeles rely on cars as the dominant mode of transportation, but starting in 1990 Los Angeles Metro Rail has built over one hundred miles (160 km) of light and heavy rail serving more and more parts of Los Angeles.

== Airports ==
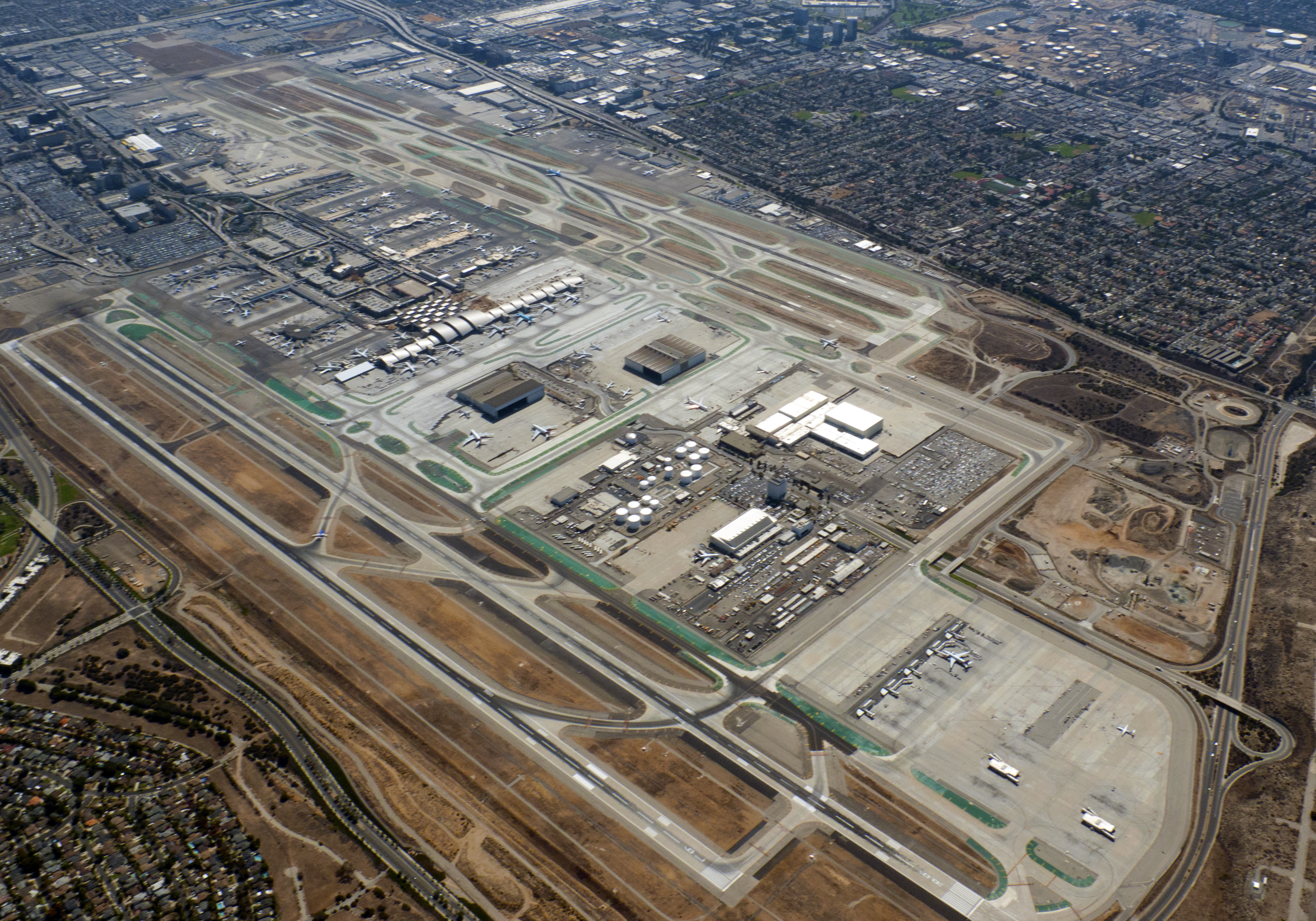
An aerial view of Los Angeles International Airport, 2014

Greater Los Angeles has five airports served by commercial airlines. In addition to these airports, there are many general aviation airports in the region.

- Los Angeles International Airport (LAX)
  The busiest in both the region and in the state, LAX is a major international gateway for the country.
- John Wayne Airport (SNA)
  Located in Orange County, it is the second-busiest in the area.
- Ontario International Airport (ONT)
  Located in Ontario in San Bernardino County, it serves as an overflow to LAX.
- Hollywood Burbank Airport (BUR)
  The smallest of the primary airports in Los Angeles County, it only has domestic air service.
- Long Beach Airport (LGB)
  The least busiest commercial airport in Los Angeles County

== Public transportation ==
=== Rail ===
==== Local ====
===== Metrolink =====
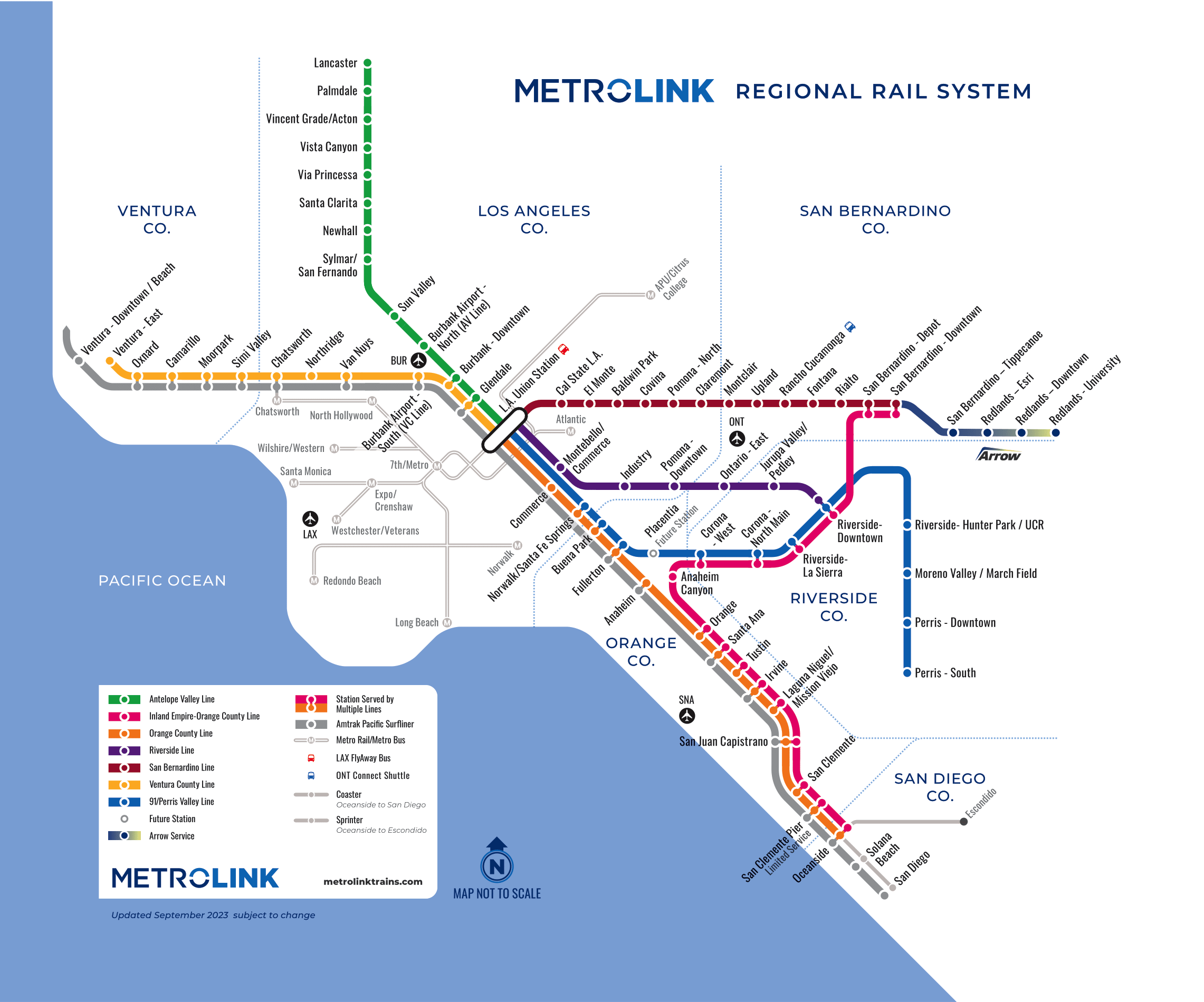
Map of the Metrolink system

As Greater Los Angeles' main commuter rail service, Metrolink runs eight lines through Southern California.

- 91/Perris Valley Line (83.8 mile route between Union Station and Perris–South)
- Arrow (9 mile route between San Bernardino–Downtown and Redlands–University)
- Antelope Valley Line (76.6 mile route between Union Station and Lancaster)
- Inland Empire–Orange County Line (100.1 mile route between San Bernardino and Oceanside)
- Orange County Line (87.2 mile route between Union Station and Oceanside)
- Riverside Line (59.1 mile route between Union Station and Riverside–Downtown)
- San Bernardino Line (61.5 mile route between Union Station and San Bernardino/Riverside–Downtown)
- Ventura County Line (70.9 mile route between Union Station and Montalvo, Ventura)

===== Los Angeles Metro Rail =====
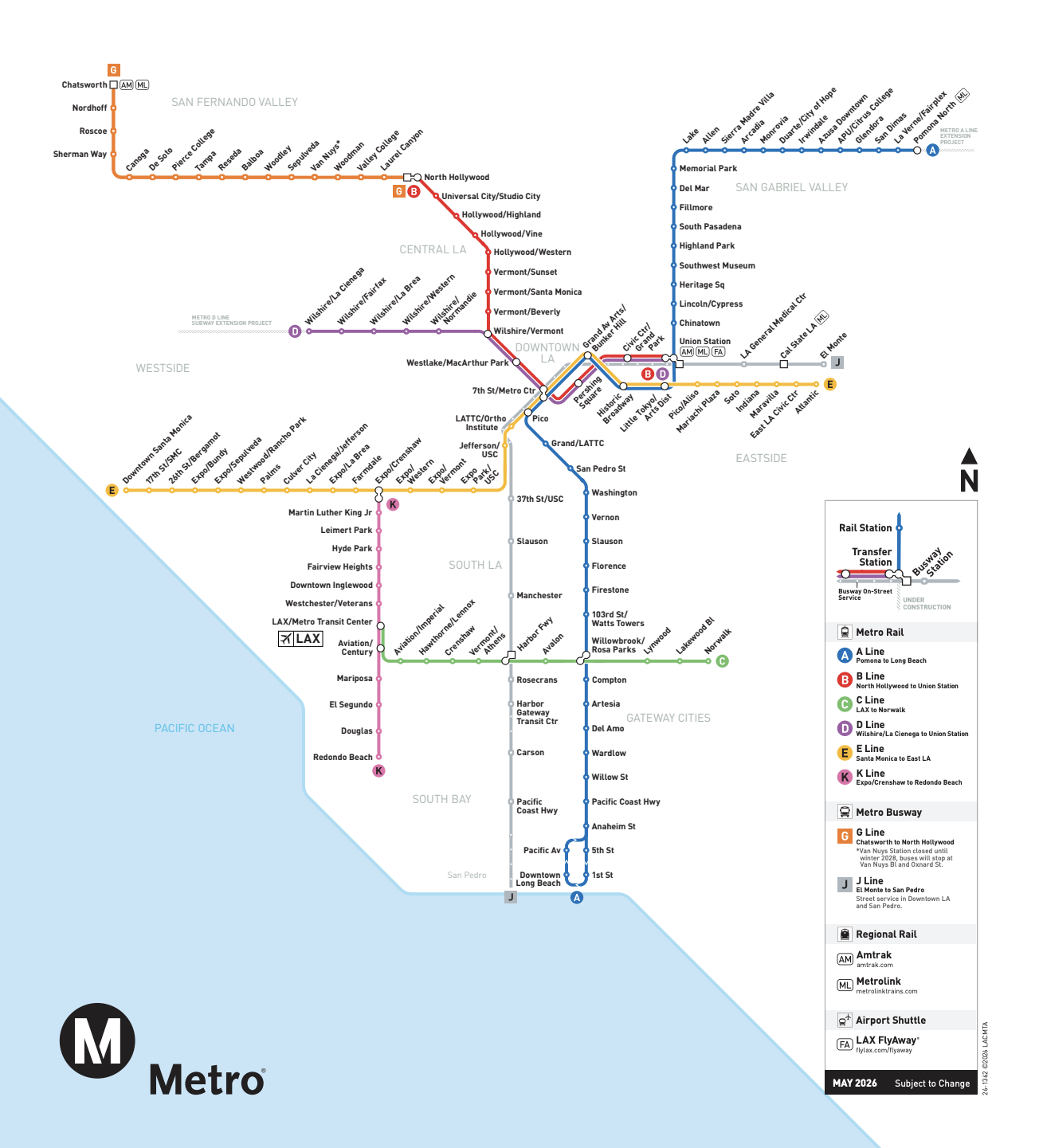
Map of the Metro Rail and Metro Busway system

The Los Angeles Metro Rail is a light rail and rapid transit system that serves primarily Los Angeles and its surrounding cities. There are several routes associated to this system, which follows:

- The A Line (opened in 1990 as the Blue Line) is a light rail line running between 7th Street/Metro Center station in Downtown Los Angeles and Downtown Long Beach station in Downtown Long Beach. It is the first of the MTA's modern rail lines since the 1961 demise of the Pacific Electric Railway's Red Car system.
- The B Line is a subway line running between Union Station in Downtown Los Angeles and North Hollywood station in North Hollywood. The first leg opened as the Red Line to Westlake/MacArthur Park in 1993, to Hollywood in 1999, and to North Hollywood in 2000.
- The C Line (opened in 1995 as the Green Line) is a light rail line running between Redondo Beach station in the South Bay region of Los Angeles and the Norwalk station in Norwalk. The line operates mostly in the median of the Century Freeway (Interstate 105). It offers indirect access to Los Angeles International Airport via a shuttle bus from the LAX/Metro Transit Center. It is the region's only above-ground light rail line that is completely grade separated.
- The D Line (named the Purple Line in 2006; first leg to Westlake/MacArthur Park opened in 1993; to Koreatown in 1996) is a subway line running between Union Station in Downtown Los Angeles and Wilshire/Western station in the Koreatown neighborhood of Los Angeles Mid-Wilshire district. It was considered a branch of the Red Line prior to 2006.
- The E Line (opened in 2012 as the Expo Line) is a light rail line running between the 7th Street/Metro Center station in Downtown Los Angeles and Downtown Santa Monica station in Santa Monica. The first phase of the line to Culver City opened in 2012, and the second phase to Santa Monica opened in 2016.
- The K Line (opened in 2022) is a light rail line running between Westchester/Veterans station in Westchester and Expo/Crenshaw station in the Jefferson Park neighborhood of South Los Angeles, where it connects with the E Line. The line passes through the city of Inglewood and through various neighborhoods in the South Los Angeles region. A connection to the C Line will open in late 2023 and a connection to SkyLink will open in 2026.

===== Streetcars =====
The OC Streetcar, currently under construction in Orange County, will run 4.15 mi (6.7 km) between Santa Ana and Garden Grove. It reuses portions of the historic Pacific Electric right-of-way and is expected to open in 2026.

The Los Angeles Streetcar is a planned electric streetcar project to restore local streetcar service in Downtown Los Angeles. It will include around 16 stations and operate over a single route in-street, serving major streets such as Grand, Broadway, 1st, Figueroa, 11th, Hill, and 7th.

==== Long-distance and intercity rail ====
- Amtrak California Pacific Surfliner
  A 350-mile (560 km) Amtrak California passenger train route serving communities on the coast of Southern California between San Diego and San Luis Obispo.
- Coast Starlight
  A 1,377-mile (2,216 km) passenger train route operated by Amtrak on the West Coast of the United States. It runs from Union Station in Los Angeles north to King Street Station in Seattle, Washington.
- Southwest Chief
  A 2,265-mile (3,645 km) passenger train route operated by Amtrak through the Midwestern and Southwestern United States. It runs from Union Station in Los Angeles east through Arizona, New Mexico, Colorado, Kansas, Missouri, Iowa, and Illinois to Chicago Union Station in Chicago, Illinois.
- Sunset Limited
  A passenger train that for most of its history has run between Los Angeles and New Orleans, and that from early 1993 through late August 2005 also ran east of New Orleans to Florida, making it during that time the only true transcontinental passenger train in American history (ignoring, of course, the comparatively small gaps between its endpoint stations and the respective seacoasts).
- Texas Eagle

- A passenger train route operated by Amtrak that normally connects Chicago Union Station with San Antonio station in San Antonio, Texas. Three times per week, the Texas Eagle joins the Sunset Limited in San Antonio and continues west to Los Angeles.

=== Bus ===
Buses in Greater Los Angeles are provided by several governmental entities, each serving a specific region.

==== Los Angeles County ====
- Antelope Valley Transit Authority, serves Palmdale, Lancaster, and Northern Los Angeles County.
- Beach Cities Transit, primarily serves Redondo Beach, Hermosa Beach, and Manhattan Beach, with additional service to El Segundo.
- Big Blue Bus, primarily serves Santa Monica and the Westside region.
- Burbank Bus, serves Burbank.
- City of Commerce Municipal Bus Lines, serves the City of Commerce.
- City of Santa Clarita Transit, serves Santa Clarita and adjacent areas.
- Culver CityBus, serves Culver City and adjacent areas.
- El Monte Transit, serves El Monte
- Foothill Transit, primarily serves cities and areas in both the San Gabriel Valley and the Pomona Valley.
- Glendale Beeline, serves Glendale and adjacent areas.
- GTrans, serves Gardena and adjacent areas.
- Los Angeles Metro Bus, provides the main local bus service in the City of Los Angeles as well as other cities and areas in the Los Angeles Basin, the San Fernando Valley, and the western San Gabriel Valley.
- LADOT:
  - LADOT Commuter Express, an express bus service with lines running during rush hours only, connecting Downtown Los Angeles with other areas in Los Angeles County.
  - LADOT DASH, a system of Los Angeles neighborhood circulator bus services
- Long Beach Transit, serves Long Beach and adjacent areas.
- Montebello Bus Lines, serves Montebello and adjacent areas.
- Monterey Park Spirit Bus, serves Monterey Park and adjacent areas.
- Norwalk Transit, serves Norwalk and adjacent areas.
- PVPTA, serves the Palos Verdes Peninsula and adjacent areas.
- Pasadena Transit, serves Pasadena and adjacent areas.
- Torrance Transit, primarily serves Torrance and the South Bay region.
- The PickUp, a free weekend-only nighttime shuttle bus service along Santa Monica Boulevard in West Hollywood.

==== Orange County ====
- Anaheim Resort Transportation, primarily serves Anaheim hotels, malls, and other tourist-related destinations.
- OC Bus, the main bus agency in Orange County.

==== Riverside County ====
- Beaumont Transit, serves Beaumonr and adjacent areas.
- Riverside Transit Agency, the main bus agency in western Riverside County.
- SunLine Transit Agency, the main bus agency in the Coachella Valley.

==== San Bernardino County ====
- Mountain Transit, primary serves Big Bear Lake, Big Bear Valley, and nearby communities in the San Bernardino Mountains.
- Basin Transit, primarily serves Yucca Valley, Twentynine Palms, and nearby communities in the Morongo Basin.
- Omnitrans, serves San Bernardino and other areas in the San Bernardino Valley.
- Victor Valley Transit Authority, serves areas in the Victor Valley.

==== Ventura County ====
- Gold Coast Transit, the main local bus agency in Ventura County.
- Thousand Oaks Transit, serves Thousand Oaks
- VCTC Intercity, provides intercity bus service between various Ventura County cities, with connections to communities in neighboring Los Angeles and Santa Barbara counties.

== Roads ==
The Greater Los Angeles area operates on a network of public roadways and highways connecting locations together.

=== Major Freeways leading into and out of Greater Los Angeles Area ===
- Interstate 5 southbound to Tijuana in Baja California, Mexico, northbound to the Central Valley
  - John J. Montgomery Freeway from U.S.-Mexico border crossing at San Ysidro to downtown San Diego
  - San Diego Freeway from downtown San Diego to the El Toro Y
  - Santa Ana Freeway from the El Toro Y to the East L.A. Interchange
  - Golden State Freeway from the East L.A. Interchange to Wheeler Ridge
- Interstate 10 west terminus at Santa Monica, eastbound to the Arizona State Line
  - Santa Monica Freeway from Santa Monica to the East L.A. Interchange
  - San Bernardino Freeway from the East L.A. Interchange to San Bernardino
- Interstate 15 south terminus in Barrio Logan in San Diego, northbound to the Nevada State Line
  - Temecula Valley Freeway from the San Diego County Line to Lake Elsinore
  - Corona Freeway from Lake Elsinore to Corona
  - Ontario Freeway from Corona to Devore
  - Mojave Freeway from Devore to the Nevada State Line
- Interstate 40 west terminus in Barstow, eastbound to the Arizona State Line
  - Needles Freeway
- U.S. Route 101 south terminus at the East L.A. Interchange, westbound to Santa Barbara then northbound to the Central Coast of California
  - Santa Ana Freeway from the East L.A. Interchange to the Four Level Interchange
  - Hollywood Freeway from the Four Level Interchange to the junction with the Ventura Freeway
  - Ventura Freeway from the junction with the Hollywood Freeway to Seacliff
- State Route 14, south terminus at the Newhall Pass Interchange, northbound to Bishop via U.S. Route 395
  - Antelope Valley Freeway from the Newhall Pass Interchange to Mojave

=== Greater Los Angeles Freeways ===
- State Route 1
  - freeway stub in Dana Point, leading north from Interstate 5
  - freeway stub east of Oxnard
- State Route 2
  - Glendale Freeway from Silver Lake to junction with State Route 134 in Glendale
  - Frank D. Lanterman Freeway from junction with State Route 134 to La Cañada Flintridge
- Interstate 5
  - San Diego Freeway from San Diego to the El Toro Y in Irvine
  - Santa Ana Freeway from the El Toro Y in Irvine to the East L.A. Interchange
  - Golden State Freeway from the East L.A. Interchange to Wheeler Ridge in Kern County
- Interstate 10
  - Santa Monica Freeway from Santa Monica to the East L.A. Interchange
  - San Bernardino Freeway from the East L.A. Interchange to San Bernardino
- State Route 14
  - Antelope Valley Freeway from Sylmar to Mojave in Kern County
- Interstate 15
  - Temecula Valley Freeway from San Diego County line to Lake Elsinore
  - Corona Freeway from Lake Elsinore to Corona
  - Ontario Freeway from Corona to Devore
  - Mojave Freeway from Devore to the Nevada State Line
- State Route 22
  - 7th Street freeway stub from Long Beach to Los Alamitos at the Interstate 405 and Interstate 605 interchange
  - Garden Grove Freeway from Westminster to Orange
- State Route 23
  - Moorpark Freeway from Newberry Springs to Moorpark
- State Route 33
  - Ojai Freeway from Ventura to Casitas Springs
- Interstate 40
  - Needles Freeway from Barstow to the Arizona State Line
- State Route 47
  - Vincent Thomas Bridge connecting San Pedro to Terminal Island
  - Terminal Island Freeway from Seaside Avenue to Henry Ford Avenue exit (splitting off from State Route 103
- State Route 55
  - Costa Mesa Freeway, formerly Newport Freeway from Costa Mesa to Anaheim
- State Route 57
  - Orange Freeway from the Orange Crush interchange to San Dimas
- State Route 58
  - freeway stub west from Barstow
- State Route 60
  - Pomona Freeway from the East L.A. Interchange to Riverside
  - Moreno Valley Freeway from Riverside to the junction with Interstate 10
- State Route 71
  - Chino Valley Freeway from just north of State Route 91 to State Route 60
  - freeway stub from the Kellogg Interchange leading to the Corona Expressway
- State Route 73
  - Corona del Mar Freeway from Costa Mesa to Irvine
  - San Joaquin Hills Toll Road from Irvine to Laguna Niguel
- State Route 90
  - Marina Freeway freeway stub east and west of the Interstate 405 near Marina del Rey
  - Richard M. Nixon Parkway freeway stub west from just north of State Route 91 in Yorba Linda
- State Route 91
  - Gardena Freeway from Interstate 110 in Gardena to Artesia
  - Artesia Freeway from Artesia to Fullerton at Interstate 5
  - Riverside Freeway from Fullerton at Interstate 5 to Riverside
- U.S. Route 101
  - Santa Ana Freeway from the East L.A. Interchange to the Four Level Interchange
  - Hollywood Freeway from the Four Level Interchange to the junction with State Route 134 and State Route 170
  - Ventura Freeway from the junction with State Route 134 and State Route 170 to Seacliff just west of Ventura
- State Route 103
  - Terminal Island Freeway co-signed from Seaside Avenue with State Route 47 to Sepulveda Blvd/Willow Street in Long Beach
- Interstate 105
  - Glenn Anderson Freeway, more commonly known as the Century Freeway, from El Segundo to Norwalk
- Interstate 110
  - Harbor Freeway from San Pedro to Downtown L.A. at the interchange with the Santa Monica Freeway
- State Route 110
  - Harbor Freeway from the interchange with the Santa Monica Freeway to the Four Level Interchange
  - Pasadena Freeway from the Four Level Interchange to Pasadena
- State Route 118
  - Ronald Reagan Freeway, also known as the Simi Valley-San Fernando Valley Freeway, or more simply, the Simi Valley Freeway from Moorpark to San Fernando
- State Route 133
  - Laguna Freeway from just south of Interstate 405 to Interstate 5
  - Eastern Transportation Corridor from Interstate 5 to State Route 241
- State Route 134
  - Ventura Freeway from the junction with the Hollywood Freeway in Universal City to Pasadena
- State Route 138
  - freeway stub east from Interstate 5 near Gorman
- State Route 170
  - Hollywood Freeway from the interchange with the Ventura Freeway to the Golden State Freeway
- Interstate 210 and State Route 210
  - Foothill Freeway from Sylmar to Redlands
- Interstate 215
  - Escondido Freeway from Murrieta to Riverside
  - Riverside Freeway from Riverside to San Bernardino
  - Barstow Freeway from San Bernardino to Devore
- State Route 241
  - Foothill Transportation Corridor from Oso Parkway to the Eastern Transportation Corridor
  - Eastern Transportation Corridor from the Foothill Transportation Corridor to the Riverside Freeway
- State Route 261
  - Eastern Transportation Corridor from Jamboree Road near the Santa Ana Freeway to State Route 241
- Interstate 405
  - San Diego Freeway from the El Toro Y in Irvine to San Fernando
- Interstate 605
  - San Gabriel River Freeway from Los Alamitos to Duarte
- Interstate 710
  - Long Beach Freeway from Long Beach to Valley Boulevard in Alhambra
  - freeway stub south from the Foothill Freeway (unsigned SR 710)

== Limited access on Santa Catalina Island ==
Santa Catalina Island is served by Catalina Express or Catalina Flyer, with regular daily service to Newport Beach, San Pedro, Long Beach, and Dana Point. Ferries typically stop at either one of the two communities on the island, Avalon or Two Harbors. The ferry crossing takes just over an hour.

Helicopter service is also available from Long Beach or San Pedro. Small planes can also land at the Catalina Airport, known as the "Airport in the Sky", located 7 miles (11 km) northwest of Avalon.

However, there is no regular vehicle ferry service for visitors to take their car. The use of motor vehicles on the island, and within the City of Avalon in particular, is restricted. Instead, the primary method of transportation within the city is by small gasoline or electric powered motorcars referred to locally as "autoettes". These include numerous golf carts and similarly sized vehicles. Vehicles under 55 inches (140 cm) wide, 120 inches (300 cm) long, and less than 1,800 pounds (820 kg) may qualify as an autoette. Any resident may acquire an autoette permit with the restriction of one permit per household. It is very difficult for a private citizen to get a permit to have a full-size vehicle in Avalon. The permit is issued to the individual as opposed to a specific vehicle, is surrendered when residency on the island ends, and is not transferable except through petition before the city council. Only one new vehicle permit is issued for every two permits that become ineligible to be renewed or are voluntarily surrendered. This typically translates into a 25-year-long wait list to bring a full-size private car to the island.

== See also ==
- Plug-in electric vehicles in California § Los Angeles
- Transportation of Los Angeles
- Transportation in the Inland Empire
