= Transportation in the Inland Empire =

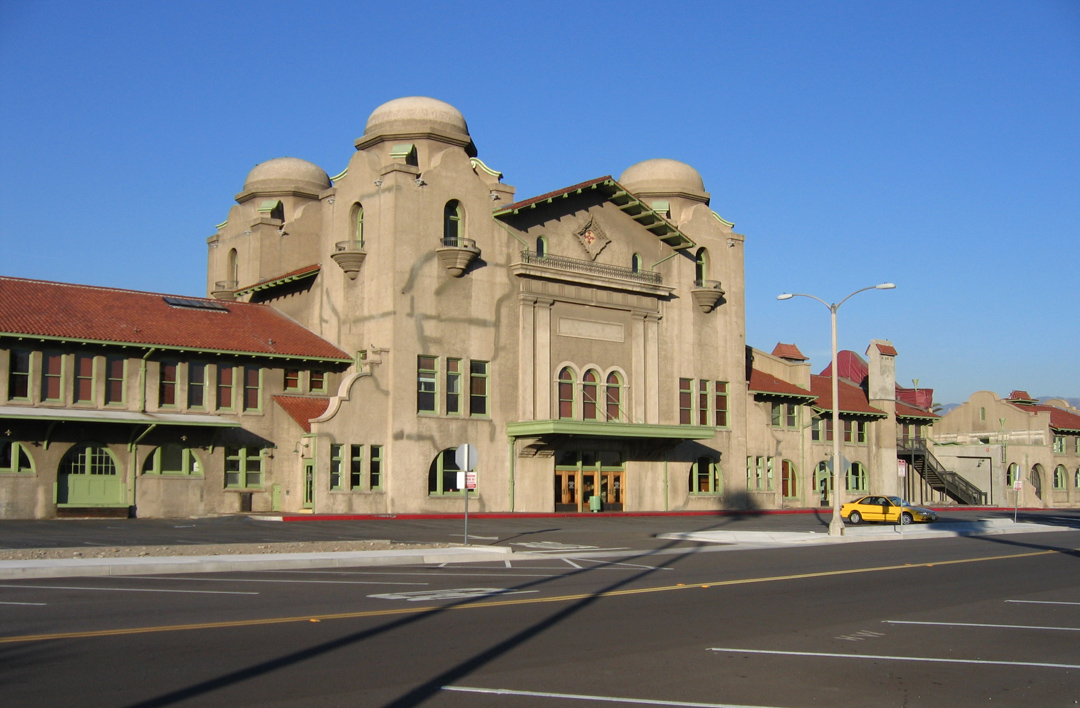
Santa Fe Depot in Downtown San Bernardino, a hub for rail traffic in the Inland Empire.

Many of the existing freeways in Southern California's Inland Empire were completed in the late 1970s. The only exception is the segment of the Foothill Freeway, State Route 210 (SR 210) between San Dimas and San Bernardino, completed in July 2007. In general, most of the higher paying jobs are located in Los Angeles and Orange County. Thus, workers must commute daily up to two hours in each direction on the existing network. As the population increases, traffic congestion is also projected to increase. In 2007, Forbes magazine ranked the area first in its list of America's most unhealthy commutes, beating every other major metropolitan area in the country, as Inland area drivers breathe the unhealthiest air and have the highest rate of fatal auto accidents per capita.

== Freeway system ==
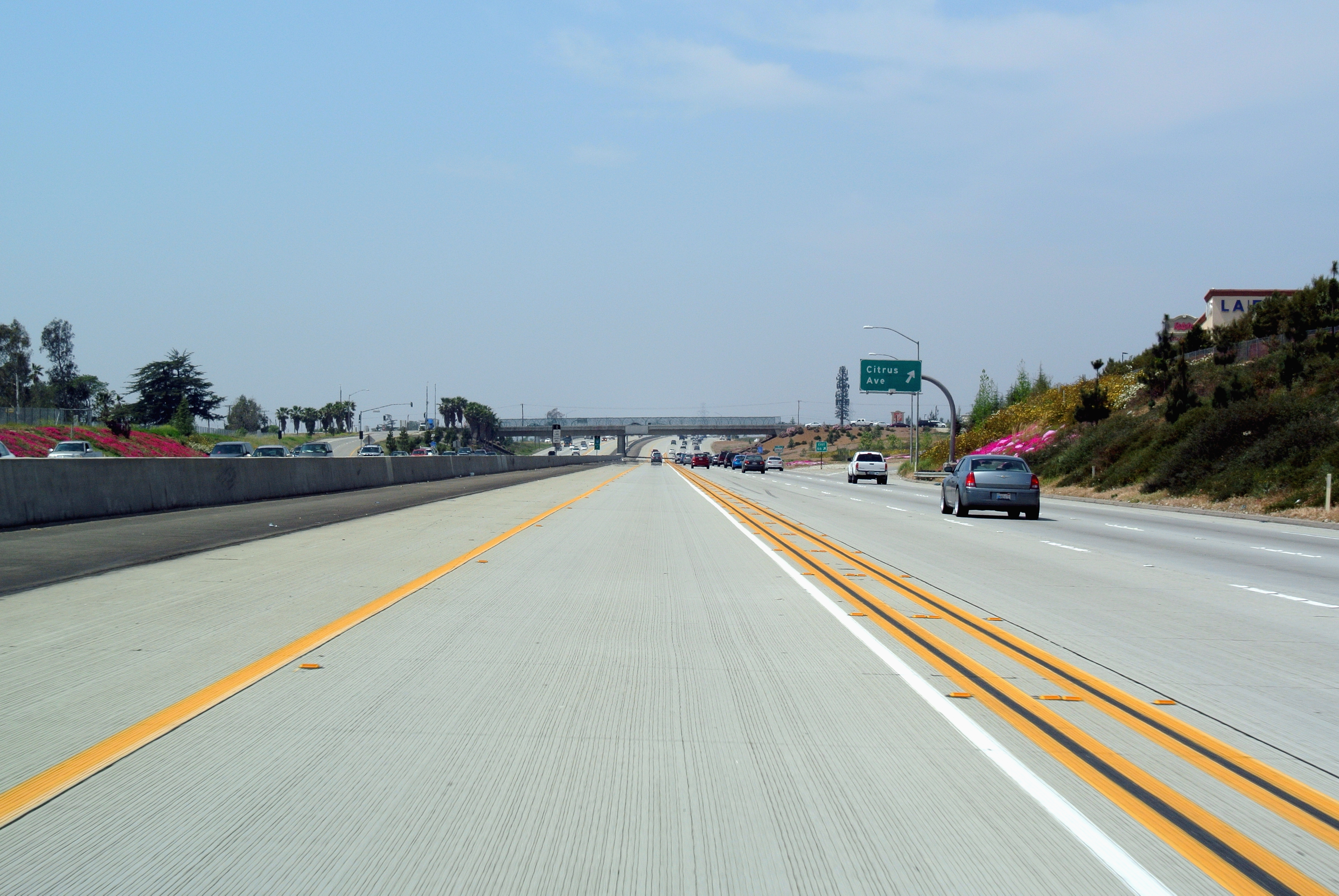
Foothill Freeway

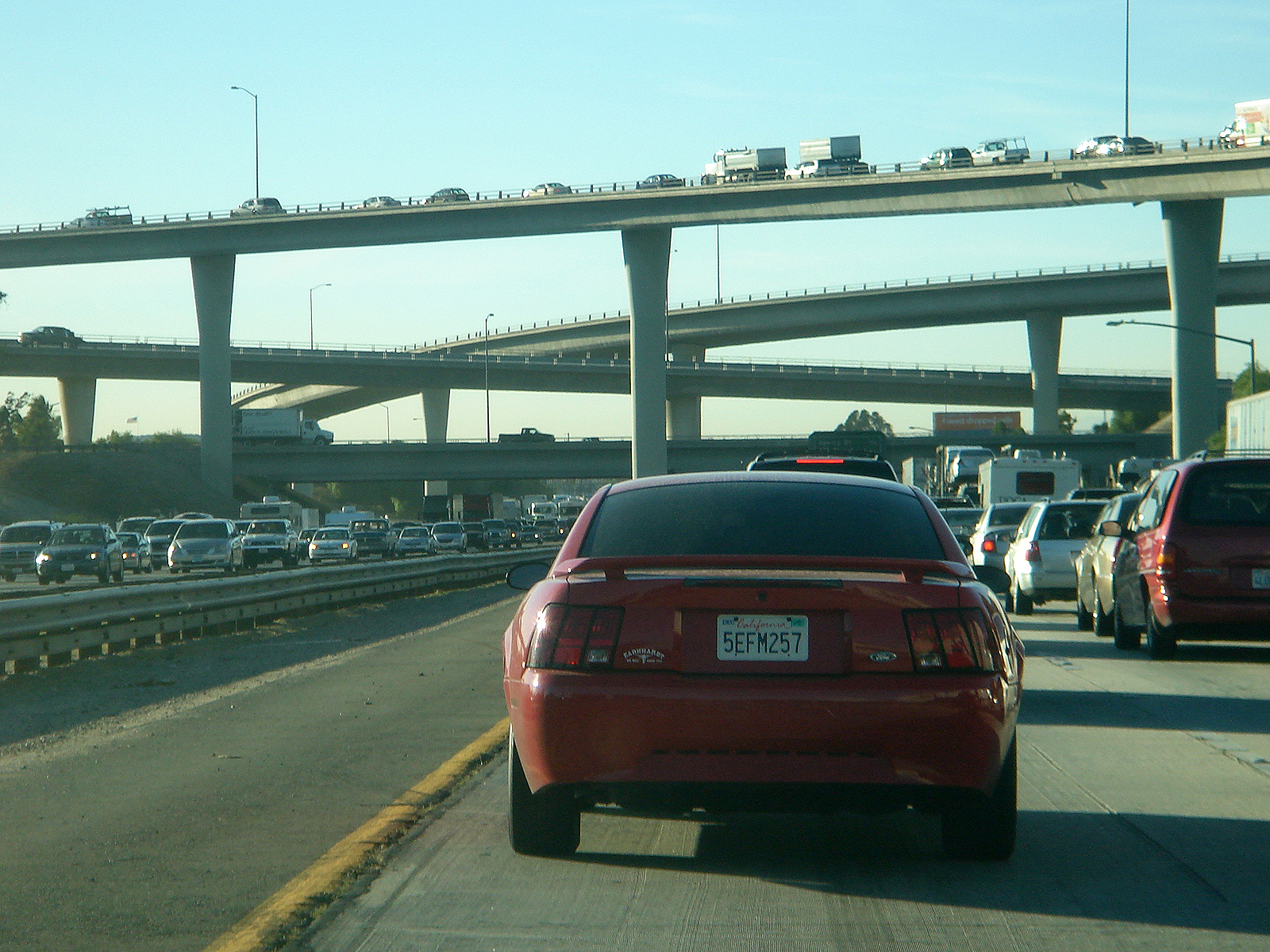
I-10, 215 Interchange traffic towards downtown San Bernardino.

The Inland Empire is crossed by two interstates and several major state highways. Although major freeway construction was finished years ago (except for the recent completion of SR 210 from Fontana to San Bernardino), growth in the region has strained the freeway system. As a result, several major projects have recently been completed or are underway on freeways throughout the region. Examples include the 60/215/91 interchange and widening of I-10 through Redlands as well as the currently ongoing widening of I-215 through Downtown San Bernardino into the city's University District.

- State Route 2
- San Bernardino Freeway (Interstate 10)
- Mojave Freeway/Barstow Freeway/Ontario Freeway/Corona Freeway/Temecula Valley Freeway/Escondido Freeway (Interstate 15)
- State Route 18
- State Route 38
- Needles Freeway (Interstate 40)
- State Route 58
- Pomona Freeway/Moreno Valley Freeway (State Route 60)
- State Route 62
- State Route 66
- Corona Expressway/Chino Valley Freeway (State Route 71)
- State Route 74
- State Route 78
- State Route 79
- State Route 83
- State Route 86
- Riverside Freeway (State Route 91)
- U.S. Route 95
- State Route 111
- State Route 127
- State Route 138
- State Route 142
- State Route 173
- State Route 177
- State Route 178
- State Route 189
- Foothill Freeway (State Route 210)
- Barstow Freeway/San Bernardino Freeway/Riverside Freeway/Moreno Valley Freeway/Escondido Freeway (Interstate 215)
- State Route 243
- State Route 247
- State Route 259
- State Route 330
- State Route 371
- U.S. Route 395
- County Route R2
- County Route R3

== Public transportation ==
Downtown San Bernardino's Civic Center Station on the rapid transit sbX's Green Line. This station is the northernmost downtown station located on Court Street, near Court Street Square and the Entertainment District's Theatre Square.	Downtown San Bernardino's Hunts Lane Station on the rapid transit sbX's Green Line. The station is the southernmost downtown station located on Hunts Lane, near the San Bernardino Hall of Records.

- Metrolink commuter rail provides service to points throughout the Inland Empire, the Greater Los Angeles Area, San Diego Metropolitan Area and the rest of Southern California.
- sbX, a brt system that is currently the only rapid transit system in the Inland Empire. Serves San Bernardino and Loma Linda.
- Morongo Basin Transit Authority provides bus service to and from Morongo Basin communities, Palm Springs, Yucca Valley and Twentynine Palms.
- Omnitrans is the largest public transportation provider in San Bernardino County.
- Riverside Transit Agency is the largest public transportation provider in Riverside County.

== Airports ==
Three major airports serve the Inland Empire: Ontario, Palm Springs, and San Bernardino. However, there are many general aviation airports across the region.

Airport	IATA code	ICAO code	County
Ontario International Airport	ONT	KONT	San Bernardino
Palm Springs International Airport	PSP	KPSP	Riverside
San Bernardino International Airport	SBD	KSBD	San Bernardino
