= Southern California freeways =

Freeway system

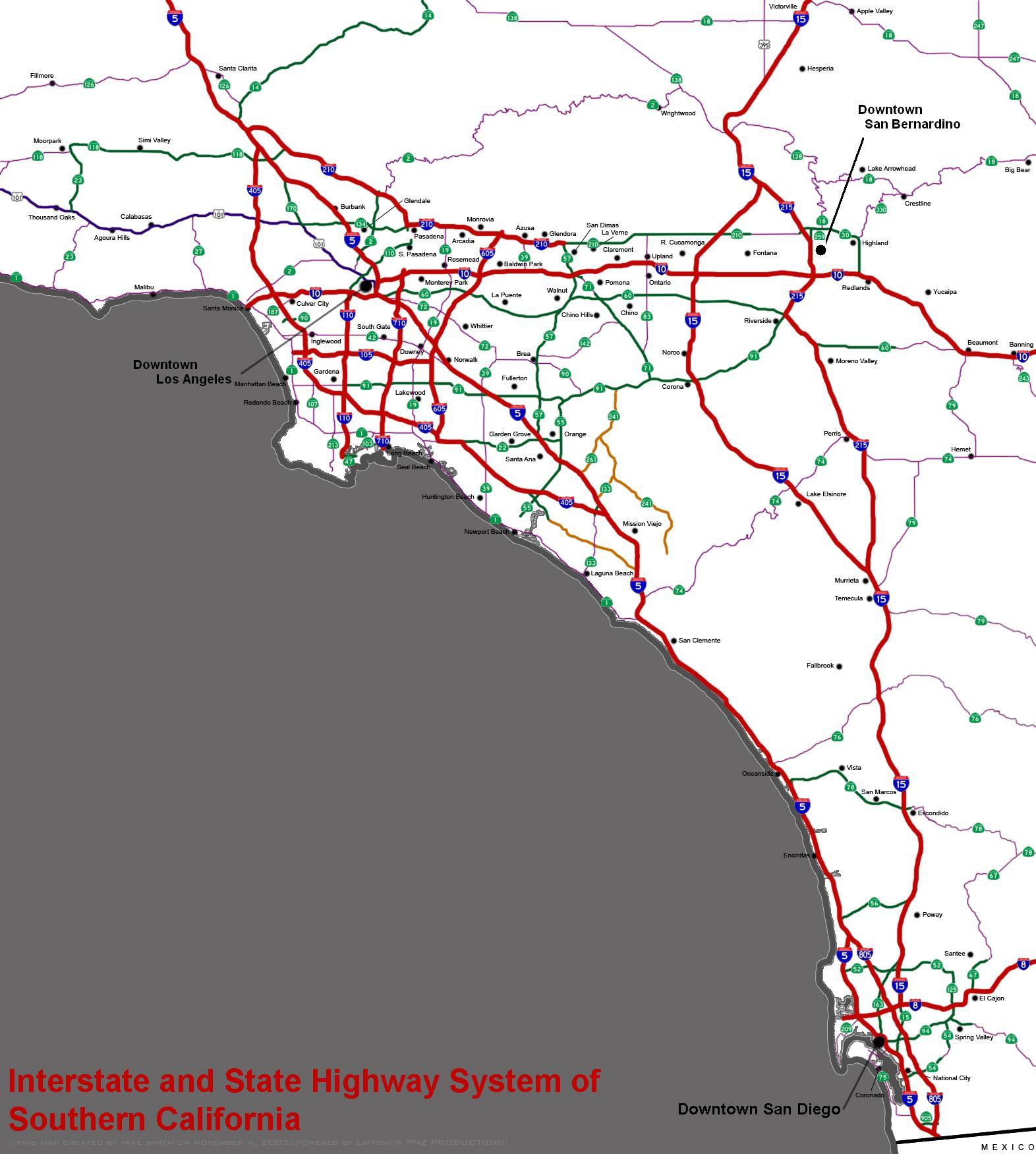
Interstate and State Highway System of Southern California

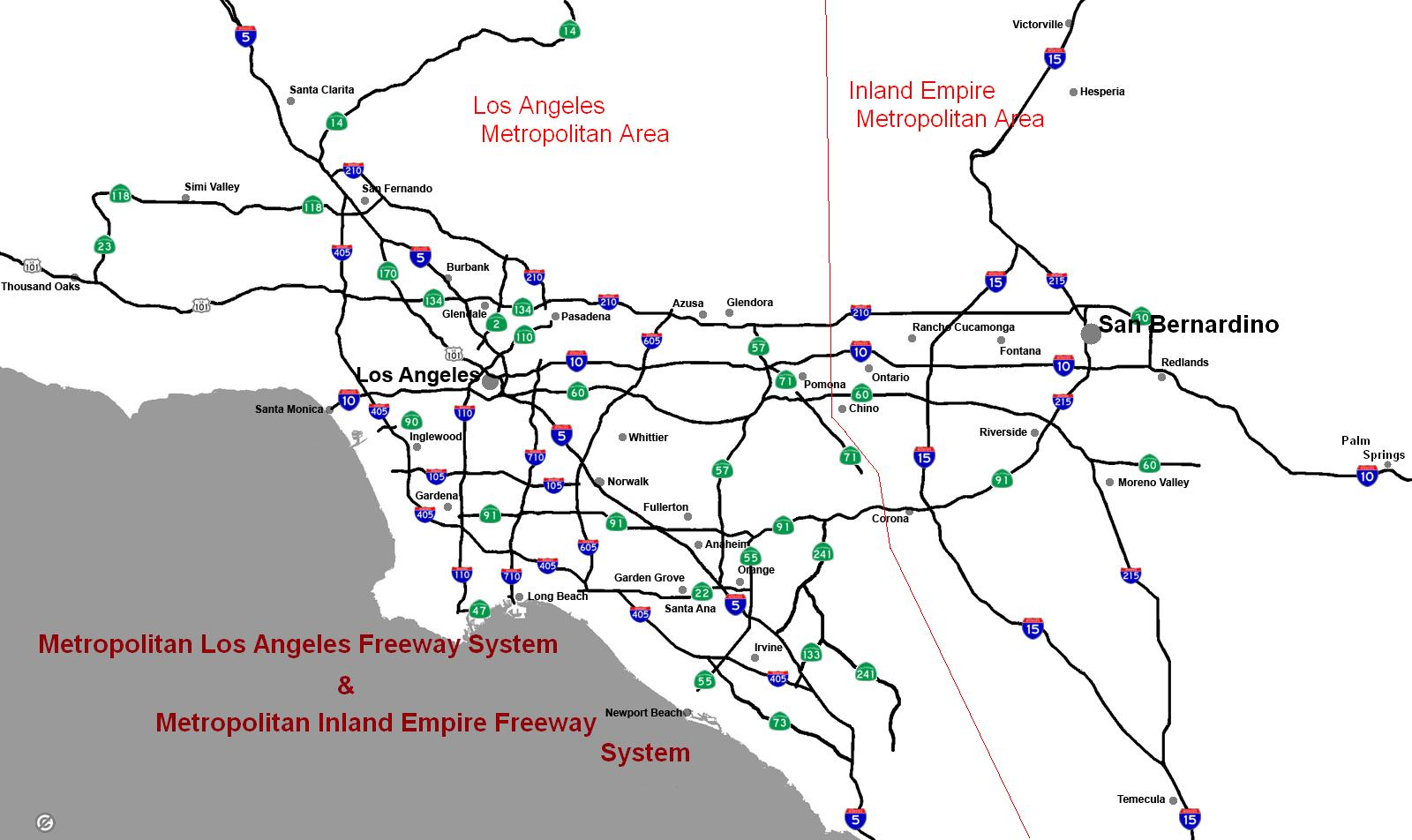
Metropolitan Los Angeles Freeway System and Metropolitan Inland Empire

A vast network of interconnected freeways in the megaregion of Southern California serves a population of over 23 million people. The Master Plan of Metropolitan Los Angeles Freeways was adopted by the Regional Planning Commission in 1947 and construction began in the early 1950s. The plan hit opposition and funding limitations in the 1970s, and by 2004, only some 61% of the original planned network had been completed.

== History ==
=== Origins ===
Southern California's romance with the automobile owes in large part to resentment of the Southern Pacific Railroad's tight control over the region's commerce in the late 19th and early 20th centuries. During his successful campaign for governor in 1910, anti-Southern Pacific candidate Hiram Johnson traveled the state by car, which was no small feat at that time. In the minds of Southlanders, this associated the automobile with clean, progressive government, in stark contrast to the railroads' control over the corrupt governments of the Midwest and Northeast. While the Southern Pacific-owned Pacific Electric Railway's famous Red Car streetcar lines were the axis of urbanization in Los Angeles during its period of spectacular growth in the 1910s and 1920s, they were unprofitable and increasingly unattractive compared to automobiles. As cars became cheaper and began to fill the region's roads in the 1920s, Pacific Electric lost ridership. Traffic congestion soon threatened to choke off the region's development altogether. At the same time, a number of influential urban planners were advocating the construction of a network of what one widely read book dubbed "Magic Motorways", as the backbone of suburban development. These "greenbelt" advocates called for decentralized, automobile-oriented development as a means of remedying both urban overcrowding and declining rates of home ownership.

Traffic congestion was of such great concern by the late 1930s in the Los Angeles metropolitan area that the influential Automobile Club of Southern California engineered an elaborate plan to create an elevated freeway-type "Motorway System," a key aspect of which was the dismantling of the streetcar lines, to be replaced with buses that could run on both local streets and on the new express roads. In the late 1930s, when the freeway system was originally planned locally by Los Angeles city planners, they had intended for light rail tracks to have been installed in the center margin of each freeway (which would presumably have carried Pacific Electric Railway red cars), but this plan was never fully implemented.

=== Planning and construction ===
During World War II, transportation bottlenecks on Southern California roads and railways convinced many that if Southern California was to accommodate a large population, it needed a completely new transportation system. The city of Los Angeles favored an upgraded rail transit system focused on its central city. However, the success of the Arroyo Seco Parkway, built between Los Angeles and Pasadena in 1940, convinced many that a freeway system could solve the region's transportation problems. Leaders of surrounding cities, such as Whittier, South Gate, Long Beach, and Pasadena, accordingly called for a web of freeways to connect the whole region, rather than funneling their residents out of their own downtowns and into that of Los Angeles. Pro-freeway sentiments prevailed, and by 1947, a new comprehensive freeway plan for Los Angeles (based largely on the original locally planned 1930s system, but without the light rail tracks in the median strips of the freeways) had been drawn up by the California Department of Public Works (now Caltrans). San Diego soon followed suit, and by the early 1950s, construction had begun on much of the region's freeway system.

== Proposed/future freeways ==
Caltrans or local transportation agencies have identified the following priority freeway projects:

- A toll road that will go through a tunnel in the Santa Ana Mountains from Irvine to Corona.
- Upgrading State Route 210 to Interstate standards and renumbering the route Interstate 210.
- A new freeway, the Mid County Parkway, from Interstate 215 in Perris to State Route 79 in San Jacinto.
- An extension for Interstate 710, the Long Beach Freeway, to its originally planned terminus at Interstate 210, the Foothill Freeway, in Pasadena, via a tunnel underneath the city of South Pasadena or some other means. Caltrans, however, cancelled the project in November 2018.
- An extension to the State Route 241 toll road to meet Interstate 5 in or near San Clemente.
- Upgrading State Route 71, the Chino Valley Freeway, to a full controlled-access freeway north of State Route 60, the Pomona Freeway, to Interstate 10, the San Bernardino Freeway, in Pomona.
- Upgrading State Route 55, the Costa Mesa Freeway, from south of its current freeway terminus at 19th Street in Costa Mesa to State Route 1, Pacific Coast Highway, in Newport Beach, potentially via a tunnel.
- Construction of the High Desert Corridor, a freeway and expressway between State Route 14, the Antelope Valley Freeway, in Palmdale and Interstate 15, the Mojave Freeway, near Victorville. It would also carry a high-speed rail line to Las Vegas, Nevada. Caltrans put the freeway on hold in 2019.
- State Route 48 is a completely unconstructed 25.5-mile (41.03 km) freeway to connect at the current SR 14/138 junction and West Avenue E, go east running parallel with East Avenue E and East Avenue G, and terminate in Hi Vista at East Avenue G/200th Street East, at the planned SR 122 freeway.
- State Route 122 is a completely unconstructed 61.3-mile (98.7 km) freeway, defined to run from SR 14 south of Palmdale, and proceed northeast through Hi Vista, and terminate at the current U.S. 395/SR 58 at Kramer Junction.
- State Route 249 is a 13.5-mile (21.7 km) unconstructed route that would connect SR 2 north of La Cañada Flintridge with SR 14 south of Palmdale. Angeles Forest Highway (CR N3) follows the general alignment, but Caltrans has no plans to take it over. However, there are plans to explore the building of this route between Palmdale and Los Angeles by tunneling through the mountains.
- A toll road that would run from SR 126 to SR 118 in Simi Valley through the Santa Susana Mountains (proposed in August 1990). The only north–south highways that connect SR 126 with SR 118 are I-5 and SR 23. Motorists on SR 126 can use this route to reach Simi Valley without having to use Interstate 5 via Newhall Pass to SR 118 or SR 23 to Moorpark and vice versa. A good traversable route would be Tapo Canyon Road, Windmill Canyon Road, and Pico Canyon Road, but Caltrans has no plans to take it over.

== Naming ==
=== Freeway names ===
Southern California residents idiomatically refer to freeways with the definite article, as "the [freeway number]", e.g. "the 5" or "the 10". This use of the article differs from other American dialects, including that of Northern California, but it is comparable to its use in parts of Canada (i.e. "the 401") in the UK (e.g. "Take the M1 to the M25") and continental European languages (e.g. "die A1" in German). In addition, sections of the southern California freeway system are often referred to by names rather than by the official numbers. For example, the names Santa Monica and San Bernardino are used for segments of the Interstate 10 even though overhead freeway signs installed at interchanges since the 1990s don't display these names, using instead the highway number, direction, and control city. A freeway "name" may refer to portions of two or more differently numbered routes; for example, the Ventura Freeway consists of portions of U.S. Route 101 and State Route 134, and the San Diego Freeway consists of portions of Interstate 5 and the full length of Interstate 405.

When Southern California freeways were built in the 1940s and early 1950s, local common usage was primarily the freeway name preceded by the definite article. It took several decades for Southern California locals to start to also commonly refer to the freeways with the numerical designations, but the usage of the definite article persisted. For example, the San Gabriel River Freeway evolved into "the 605 Freeway" and then shortened to "the 605".

=== Named interchanges ===
- Four Level (Bill Keene Memorial): US 101 / SR 110
- Dosan Ahn Chang Ho Memorial: I-10 / I-110 / SR 110
- East Los Angeles: I-5 / I-10 / SR 60 / US 101
- Hollywood Split (Bruce T. Hinman Memorial): US 101 / SR 134 / SR 170
- Judge Harry Pregerson: I-105 / I-110
- El Toro Y: Southern junction of I-5 / I-405
- Kellogg: I-10 / SR 57 / SR 71
- Orange Crush: I-5 / SR 22 / SR 57
- Newhall Pass (Clarence Wayne Dean Memorial): I-5 / SR 14
- Glendora Curve: SR 57 / I-210 / SR 210
- Jack Schrade (Mission Valley Viaduct): I-8 / I-805
- David M. Gonzales Memorial: I-5 / SR 118
- Marilyn Jorgenson Reece Memorial: I-10 / I-405
- Sadao S. Munemori Memorial: I-105 / I-405

=== Other named features ===
- Downtown Slot: where Highway 101 passes through a trench in downtown Los Angeles.
- South Bay Curve: where Interstate 405 bends from north–south to east–west in Torrance
- Sepulveda Pass: Interstate 405 just south of U.S. Route 101 near the J. Paul Getty Museum.
- Cahuenga Pass: the Hollywood Freeway just south of the interchange with the Ventura Freeway
- Figueroa Street Tunnels: the northbound lanes of the Pasadena Freeway between the Four Level Interchange and the interchange with the Golden State Freeway
- Glendora Curve: the transition of the northbound 57 Orange Freeway to the westbound 210 Foothill Freeway; or the eastbound 210 transition to the southbound 57. Formerly part of Interstate 210 before the completion of the newer section of the Foothill Freeway in 2003.

== Comparisons and firsts ==
- First freeway in California (Arroyo Seco Parkway linking Pasadena and Los Angeles)
- First stack interchange (Four Level Interchange in downtown Los Angeles)
- First grade-separated HOV lanes
- First fully automated tollway system (91 Express Lanes in northern Orange County)

Despite the enormity of the freeway network, Southern California area has fewer lane-miles per capita than most large metropolitan areas in the United States, ranking 32nd of the top 39. As of 1999, Greater Los Angeles had 0.419 lane-miles per 1,000 people, only slightly more than Greater New York City and fewer than Greater Boston, the Washington Metropolitan Area and the San Francisco Bay Area. (American metros average .613 lane-miles per thousand.) San Diego ranked 17th in the same study, with 0.659 lane-miles per thousand, and the Inland Empire ranked 21st, with 0.626.

== Limited-access roads not maintained by the state ==
The following limited-access roads are not maintained by the state:

- Colorado Street, former routing of State Route 134, from Interstate 5 to San Fernando Road just west of Glendale
- Colorado Freeway, former routing of State Route 134, from Colorado Blvd in Eagle Rock to the Ventura Freeway
- Harbor Scenic Drive from Interstate 710 at Ocean Boulevard to RMS Queen Mary
- Jamboree Road in Irvine, a non-tolled extension of State Route 261 from Walnut Avenue near Interstate 5 to Barranca Parkway
- Oak Grove Drive in Pasadena, former routing of the Foothill Freeway
- Shoreline Drive in Long Beach, the downtown exit from southbound Interstate 710 to Queens Way
- La Cienega Boulevard in the Baldwin Hills, originally intended to be part of the discontinued Laurel Canyon Freeway
- Los Patrones Parkway in Las Flores, a non-tolled extension of State Route 241 from Oso Parkway to Cow Camp Road

== List of freeways ==
=== Major freeways leading into and out of Southern California ===
- Interstate 5 south terminus at San Ysidro in San Diego, northbound to the Central Valley and Sacramento
  - John J. Montgomery Freeway from the U.S.-Mexico border crossing at San Ysidro to downtown San Diego
  - San Diego Freeway from downtown San Diego to the El Toro Y
  - Santa Ana Freeway from the El Toro Y to the East L.A. Interchange
  - Golden State Freeway from the East L.A. Interchange to Wheeler Ridge
- Interstate 8 west terminus in Ocean Beach in San Diego, eastbound to the Arizona State Line towards Yuma
  - Ocean Beach Freeway from Ocean Beach to Old Town
  - Mission Valley Freeway, also known as the Alvarado Freeway, from Old Town to El Cajon
  - Kumeyaay Highway from Ocean Beach to the San Diego-Imperial County Line as well as El Centro and Imperial
- Interstate 10 west terminus in Santa Monica, eastbound to the Arizona State Line towards Phoenix
  - Santa Monica Freeway from Santa Monica to the East L.A. Interchange
  - San Bernardino Freeway from the East L.A. Interchange to San Bernardino
- Interstate 15 south terminus in Barrio Logan in San Diego, northbound to the Nevada State Line towards Las Vegas
  - Wabash Freeway (signed as State Route 15) from Barrio Logan in San Diego to Interstate 805
  - Escondido Freeway from Interstate 805 to the San Diego-Riverside County Line
  - Temecula Valley Freeway from the San Diego-Riverside County Line to Lake Elsinore
  - Corona Freeway from Lake Elsinore to Corona
  - Ontario Freeway from Corona to the Devore neighborhood of San Bernardino
  - Mojave Freeway, also Barstow Freeway, from Devore to the Nevada State Line
- Interstate 40 west terminus in Barstow, eastbound to the Arizona State Line towards Kingman
  - Needles Freeway
- U.S. Route 101 south terminus at the East L.A. Interchange, westbound to Santa Barbara then northbound through the Central Coast region to Silicon Valley and San Francisco
  - Santa Ana Freeway from the East L.A. Interchange to the Four Level Interchange
  - Hollywood Freeway from the Four Level Interchange to the junction with the Ventura Freeway
  - Ventura Freeway from the junction with the Hollywood Freeway to Seacliff
- State Route 14, south terminus at Interstate 5 in Los Angeles, northbound to U.S. Route 395 and Bishop
  - Antelope Valley Freeway from Tunnel Station to Mojave

=== San Diego area ===
- Interstate 5
  - John J. Montgomery Freeway from U.S.-Mexico border crossing at San Ysidro to downtown San Diego
  - San Diego Freeway from downtown San Diego to the El Toro Y in Orange County
- Interstate 8
  - Ocean Beach Freeway from Ocean Beach to Old Town San Diego
  - Mission Valley Freeway from Old Town San Diego to El Cajon
  - Kumeyaay Freeway from Ocean Beach to Imperial County
- Interstate 15 and State Route 15
  - Escondido Freeway from Barrio Logan to Escondido
- State Route 52
  - Soledad Freeway from La Jolla to Santee
- State Route 54
  - South Bay Freeway from National City to Jamacha Road exit
- State Route 56
  - Ted Williams Freeway from Carmel Valley to Sabre Springs
- State Route 67
  - San Vicente Freeway from El Cajon to Lakeside
- State Route 75
  - San Diego-Coronado Bay Bridge
- State Route 78
  - Ronald Packard Parkway from Oceanside to Escondido
- State Route 94
  - Martin Luther King Jr. Freeway from downtown San Diego to Spring Valley
- State Route 125
  - South Bay Expressway from Otay Mesa to Jamacha Road exit
  - Ramona Freeway from Jamacha Road exit to Santee
- State Route 163
  - Cabrillo Freeway from downtown San Diego to Kearny Mesa at Interstate 15
- Interstate 805
  - Jacob Dekema Freeway, also known as the Inland Freeway from San Ysidro to "The Merge" at Sorrento Valley
- State Route 905
  - Otay Mesa Freeway from San Ysidro to the Otay Mesa border crossing

==== Controlled access routes not maintained by the state ====
- Kearny Villa Road near Marine Corps Air Station Miramar, former routing of U.S. Route 395
- Pacific Highway near San Diego International Airport (Lindbergh Field), former routing of U.S. Route 101
- Friars Road in Mission Valley near the site of the former San Diego Stadium

=== Inland Empire Metropolitan Area ===
(Includes San Bernardino and Riverside Counties)

- Interstate 10
  - San Bernardino Freeway from the East L.A. Interchange to San Bernardino
- Interstate 15
  - Temecula Valley Freeway from San Diego County line to Lake Elsinore.
  - Corona Freeway from Lake Elsinore to Corona
  - Ontario Freeway from Corona to San Bernardino
  - Mojave Freeway from San Bernardino to the Nevada State Line
- Interstate 40
  - Needles Freeway from Barstow to the Arizona State Line
- State Route 60
  - Pomona Freeway from the East L.A. Interchange to Riverside
  - Moreno Valley Freeway from Riverside to the junction with Interstate 10
- State Route 71
  - Chino Valley Freeway from just north of State Route 91 to State Route 57
- State Route 91
  - Riverside Freeway from Fullerton at Interstate 5 to Riverside
- Interstate 210 and State Route 210
  - Foothill Freeway from Sylmar to Redlands
- Interstate 215
  - Escondido Freeway from Murrieta to Riverside
  - Riverside Freeway from Riverside to San Bernardino
  - Barstow Freeway from San Bernardino to the northern junction with Interstate 15

=== Greater Los Angeles ===
(includes Los Angeles, Orange, Riverside, San Bernardino, Ventura Counties)

- State Route 1
  - freeway stub in Dana Point, leading north from Interstate 5
  - Santa Monica Freeway from Pacific Coast Highway in Santa Monica to Interstate 10
  - freeway stub east of Oxnard
- State Route 2
  - Glendale Freeway from Silver Lake to junction with State Route 134 in Glendale
  - Frank D. Lanterman Freeway from junction with State Route 134 to La Cañada-Flintridge
- Interstate 5
  - San Diego Freeway from San Diego to the El Toro Y
  - Santa Ana Freeway from the El Toro Y to the East L.A. Interchange
  - Golden State Freeway from the East L.A. Interchange to Wheeler Ridge in Kern County
- Interstate 10
  - Santa Monica Freeway from Santa Monica to the East L.A. Interchange
  - San Bernardino Freeway from the East L.A. Interchange to San Bernardino
- State Route 14
  - Antelope Valley Freeway from Tunnel Station to Mojave in Kern County
  - Sierra Highway (old Rte 14) from Newhall Avenue (formally SR 126/San Fernando Road) to Rainbow Glen Drive. This section is still maintained by Caltrans and is signed as 14U – Unrelinquished.
- Interstate 15
  - Temecula Valley Freeway from San Diego County line to Lake Elsinore.
  - Corona Freeway from Lake Elsinore to Corona
  - Ontario Freeway from Corona to San Bernardino
  - Mojave Freeway from San Bernardino to the Nevada State Line
- State Route 22
  - 7th Street freeway stub from Long Beach to Seal Beach at the Interstate 405 and Interstate 605 interchange
  - Garden Grove Freeway from Westminster to Orange
- State Route 23
  - Moorpark Freeway from Thousand Oaks to Moorpark
- State Route 33
  - Ojai Freeway from Ventura to Foster Park
- Interstate 40
  - Needles Freeway from Barstow to the Arizona State Line
- State Route 47
  - Vincent Thomas Bridge connecting San Pedro to Terminal Island
  - Terminal Island Freeway from Seaside Avenue to Henry Ford Avenue exit (splitting off from State Route 103)
- State Route 55
  - Newport Boulevard freeway stub north from State Route 1 in Newport Beach
  - Costa Mesa Freeway, formerly Newport Freeway from Costa Mesa to Anaheim
- State Route 57
  - Orange Freeway from the Orange Crush interchange to Glendora
- State Route 58
  - freeway stub from Keene to Mojave in Kern County
  - freeway stub from North Edwards to Kramer Junction
  - freeway stub from Hinkley to Barstow
- State Route 60
  - Pomona Freeway from the East L.A. Interchange to Riverside
  - Moreno Valley Freeway from Riverside to the junction with Interstate 10
- State Route 71
  - Chino Valley Freeway from just north of State Route 91 to State Route 57
  - freeway stub from the Kellogg Interchange leading to the Corona Expressway
- State Route 73
  - Corona del Mar Freeway from Costa Mesa to Irvine
  - San Joaquin Hills Transportation Corridor from Irvine to Laguna Niguel
- State Route 90
  - Marina Freeway freeway stub east and west of the Interstate 405 near Marina del Rey
  - Richard M. Nixon Parkway freeway stub west from State Route 91 in Yorba Linda
- State Route 91
  - Gardena Freeway from Interstate 110 in Gardena to Interstate 710 in Long Beach
  - Artesia Freeway from Interstate 710 in Long Beach to Fullerton at Interstate 5
  - Riverside Freeway from Fullerton at Interstate 5 to Riverside
- U.S. Route 101
  - Santa Ana Freeway from the East L.A. Interchange to the Four Level Interchange
  - Hollywood Freeway from the Four Level Interchange to the junction with State Route 134 and State Route 170
  - Ventura Freeway from the junction with State Route 134 and State Route 170 to Seacliff just west of Ventura
- State Route 103
  - Terminal Island Freeway co-signed from Seaside Avenue with State Route 47 to Sepulveda Boulevard/Willow Street in Long Beach
- Interstate 105
  - Glenn Anderson Freeway, more commonly known as the Century Freeway from El Segundo to Norwalk
- Interstate 110
  - Harbor Freeway from San Pedro to Downtown L.A. at the interchange with the Santa Monica Freeway
- State Route 110
  - Harbor Freeway from the interchange with the Santa Monica Freeway to the Four Level Interchange
  - Pasadena Freeway from the Four Level Interchange to Pasadena
- State Route 118
  - Ronald Reagan Freeway, also known as the Simi Valley-San Fernando Valley Freeway, or more simply, the Simi Valley Freeway from Moorpark to San Fernando
- State Route 133
  - Laguna Freeway from just south of Interstate 405 to Interstate 5
  - Eastern Transportation Corridor from Interstate 5 to State Route 241
- State Route 134
  - Ventura Freeway from Pasadena to North Hollywood at the junction with the Hollywood Freeway
- State Route 138
  - Lancaster Freeway freeway stub east from Interstate 5 near Gorman
- State Route 170
  - Hollywood Freeway from the interchange with the Ventura Freeway to the Golden State Freeway
- Interstate 210 and State Route 210
  - Foothill Freeway from Tunnel Station to Redlands
- Interstate 215
  - Escondido Freeway from Murrieta to Riverside
  - Riverside Freeway from Riverside to San Bernardino
  - Barstow Freeway from San Bernardino to the northern junction with Interstate 15
- State Route 241
  - Foothill Transportation Corridor from Oso Parkway to the Eastern Transportation Corridor
  - Eastern Transportation Corridor from the Foothill Transportation Corridor to the Riverside Freeway
- State Route 261
  - Eastern Transportation Corridor from Jamboree Road near the Santa Ana Freeway to State Route 241
- Interstate 405
  - San Diego Freeway from the El Toro Y to San Fernando
- Interstate 605
  - San Gabriel River Freeway from Seal Beach to Duarte
- Interstate 710
  - Long Beach Freeway from Long Beach to Alhambra
  - freeway stub south from the Foothill Freeway
