= California State Route 371 =

State highway in Riverside County, California, United States

State Route 371
- SR 371 highlighted in red

Route information
- Maintained by Caltrans
- Length: 20.753 mi (33.399 km)
- Existed: 1974 (from SR 71)–present

Major junctions
- West end: SR 79 in Aguanga
- East end: SR 74 near Anza

Location
- Country: United States
- State: California
- Counties: Riverside

Highway system
- State highways in California; Interstate; US; State; Scenic; History; Pre‑1964; Unconstructed; Deleted; Freeways
← SR 330	→ I-380

State Route 371 (SR 371) is a state highway in Riverside County, California, serving as a 20.75-mile (33.39 km) connector from SR 79 near Aguanga to SR 74 near Anza. The highway crosses through the private community of Lake Riverside, as well as Cahuilla and the Cahuilla Indian Reservation. It is the primary road running through Anza but mostly serves rural areas.

SR 79, SR 371, and SR 74 form a heavily-used, scenic shortcut from Temecula in southwestern Riverside County to the Coachella Valley in central Riverside County. This provides a shorter corridor from San Diego to the Coachella Valley, avoiding the heavily congested freeway route via Interstate 15 to Murrieta, Interstate 215 to Riverside, SR 60 to Beaumont, and then Interstate 10.

SR 371 was part of SR 71 until 1973, when SR 79 and SR 71 were co-signed from Aguanga to Temecula. In 1974, the portion of SR 71 from Temecula to Corona along I-15's current alignment was deleted, and the orphaned route from Aguanga to Anza was re-signed as SR 371.

== Route description ==
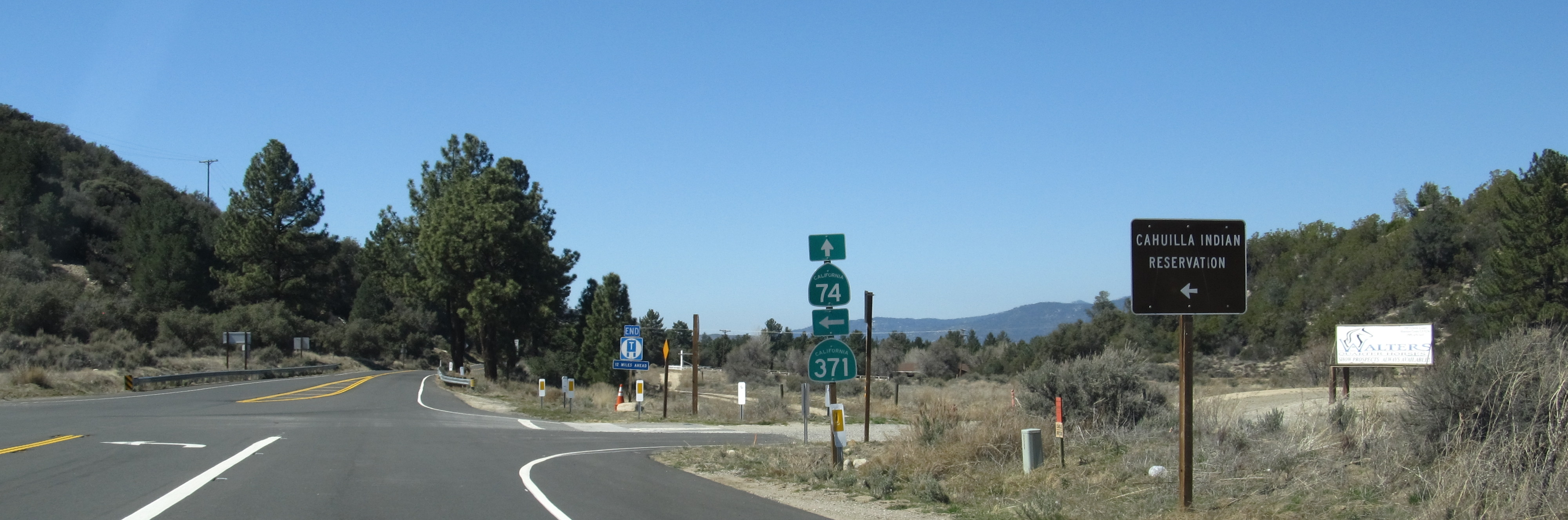
Junction SR 74 heading northwest with SR 371 on left (eastern terminus)

Route 371 is defined in section 607.1 of the California Streets and Highways Code, and that the highway is "from Route 79 near Aguanga to Route 74 east of Anza".

SR 371 begins as Cahuilla Road at an intersection with SR 79. It travels northeast away from the community of Aguanga, loosely paralleling Tule Creek for the first few miles. SR 371 continues through the Lake Riverside community, crossing over the outflow of the lake. The highway enters the Cahuilla Indian Reservation and passes by the Cahuilla Creek Casino in Cahuilla before passing through the community of Anza. SR 371 briefly becomes Kenworthy Bautista Road and parallels Hamilton Creek as it enters the San Bernardino National Forest before terminating at SR 74.

SR 371 is not part of the National Highway System, a network of highways that are considered essential to the country's economy, defense, and mobility by the Federal Highway Administration.

== History ==
Route 277 from Temecula to Anza was added to the state highway system in 1959. In the 1964 state highway renumbering, the part from US 395 to SR 74 was included as part of SR 71. In 1974, the part from near Aguanga to SR 74 became SR 371.

Before 2003, the intersection with SR 79 was very dangerous, as northbound SR 79 traffic had to stop at a stop sign and there was no such sign for southbound SR 79 traffic or for SR 371 traffic headed towards its western terminus. Now, there are stop signs in every direction at that intersection.

== Major intersections ==
Except where prefixed with a letter, postmiles were measured on the road as it was in 1964, based on the alignment of State Route 71 as it existed at that time, and do not necessarily reflect current mileage. Postmile prefixes include: R reflecting a realignment in the route since then, M indicating a second realignment, L referring to an overlap due to a correction or change, and T indicating postmiles classified as temporary. Segments that remain unconstructed or have been relinquished to local control may be omitted. The entire route is in Riverside County.

Location	Postmile	Destinations	Notes
Aguanga	56.40	SR 79 to I-15 – Warner Springs, Temecula, San Diego	West end of SR 371
Aguanga	60.23	Wilson Valley Road – Sage, Hemet	
Mountain Center	77.15	SR 74 – Idyllwild, Hemet, Indio	East end of SR 371
1.000 mi = 1.609 km; 1.000 km = 0.621 mi
