= Santa Ana Freeway =

Highway in California

Santa Ana Freeway
- Santa Ana Freeway highlighted in red

Route information
- Maintained by Caltrans
- Component highways: I-5 from Irvine to Boyle Heights, Los Angeles; US 101 from Boyle Heights to Downtown Los Angeles

Major junctions
- South end: I-5 / I-405 (El Toro Y) in Irvine
- SR 133 in Irvine SR 261 Toll in Irvine; SR 55 in Tustin; SR 22 / SR 57 (Orange Crush) in Orange; SR 91 in Buena Park; I-605 in Downey; I-710 in Vernon; I-5 / I-10 / US 101 (East LA Int.) / SR 60 in Boyle Heights
- North end: US 101 / SR 110 (4 Level Int.) in Downtown Los Angeles

Location
- Country: United States
- State: California
- Counties: Orange, Los Angeles

Highway system
- State highways in California; Interstate; US; State; Scenic; History; Pre‑1964; Unconstructed; Deleted; Freeways
- Southern California freeways

The Santa Ana Freeway is one of the principal freeways in Southern California, connecting Los Angeles and its southeastern suburbs including the freeway's namesake, the city of Santa Ana. The freeway begins at its junction with the San Diego Freeway (Interstate 405, I-405), called the El Toro Y, in Irvine, signed as I-5. From there, it generally goes southeast to northwest to the East Los Angeles Interchange, where it takes the designation of U.S. Route 101 (US 101). It then proceeds 2.95 miles (4.75 km) northwest to the Four Level Interchange (also known as the Bill Keene Memorial Interchange) in downtown Los Angeles. Formerly, the entirety of the route was marked as US 101 until the 1964 highway renumbering, which truncated US 101 to the East Los Angeles Interchange and designated the rest of the freeway as I-5.

North of the East Los Angeles Interchange complex, I-5 follows the Golden State Freeway. South of the El Toro Y, I-5 takes on the San Diego Freeway name from I-405.

The infamously busy intersection of the Santa Ana, Garden Grove, and Orange freeways in southwestern Orange is nicknamed the Orange Crush.

The freeway is officially defined as Routes 101 and 5 from Route 110 (Four Level Interchange) to Route 405.

== History ==
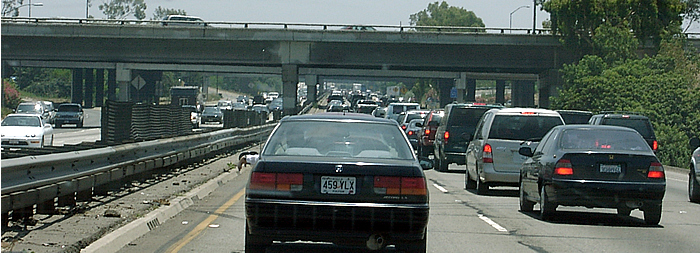
The Santa Ana Freeway is often congested, especially where it meets Interstate 605 (the San Gabriel River Freeway) in southeastern Los Angeles County.

The Santa Ana Freeway is a bypass of the original state highway from Los Angeles to Santa Ana, which passed through Whittier and mostly became SR 72 in the 1964 renumbering. Southeast of Santa Ana, this earlier highway, added to the state highway system in 1910 as Route 2, generally followed the present freeway from Tustin past East Irvine to El Toro. This route was marked as part of US 101 in 1928.

In 1933, the state legislature added a number of routes to the state highway system, including two that later formed parts of the Santa Ana Freeway. Route 166 began at the new Route 172 (now SR 60), at the corner of Indiana and Third Streets, and headed south on Indiana Street and east and southeast on Mines Avenue (Olympic Boulevard) and Anaheim-Telegraph Road (now Telegraph Road) to Route 171 (now SR 39) at the intersection with Los Nietos Road near Santa Fe Springs. Route 174 began at Route 60 (then signed Alternate U. S. 101 now SR 1) in what now is known as Westchester and followed Manchester Avenue and Firestone Boulevard (then under construction alongside the Southern Pacific Railroad's Santa Ana Branch) to Route 2 (then Los Angeles Street, now Anaheim Boulevard) in southern Anaheim. A second piece began further southeast on Route 2, where it turned east on Chapman Avenue, and followed the shorter Santa Ana Boulevard diagonally to Route 2 (Main Street) in northern Santa Ana. In 1934, Route 166, except on Indiana Street, was marked as part of Sign Route 6 (which continued along Route 171 to Buena Park), and the entire length of Route 174 became Sign Route 10. (SR 6 was renumbered to SR 26 in 1937, when US 6 entered California; SR 10 was soon truncated to Anaheim Boulevard, as US 101 had moved from Route 2 to the shorter Route 174 in Santa Ana.)

A U.S. Route 101 Bypass was created by 1941, beginning at the intersection of Routes 166 (Indiana Street, soon moved to Downey Road) and 2 (US 101 along Whittier Boulevard), and following Routes 166 and 174 to Route 2 (US 101) in Anaheim. The connection between Routes 166 and 174 was made via Route 168 (Rosemead Boulevard, then and now SR 19). This resulted in SR 10 being truncated further, to the intersection of Firestone and Rosemead Boulevards, though SR 26 continued to extend east on Routes 166 and 171 to Buena Park.

A freeway connecting downtown Los Angeles with Orange County was planned by 1939, and was included in A Transit Program for the Los Angeles Metropolitan Area, published that year by the Metropolitan Transportation Engineering Board. To allow for its construction by the state, the definition of Route 166 was modified in 1941, changing the southeast end to Route 174 near Norwalk; at the same time, the northernmost piece was changed from Indiana Street to Downey Road.

The entire Santa Ana Freeway began construction in 1947 and completed in 1956. Originally it was entirely signed as US 101 before the segment of 101 between the East Los Angeles Interchange and the United States–Mexico border in San Ysidro, California was decommissioned in favor of Interstate 5. It was approved as a chargeable interstate in 1961. The Santa Ana Freeway and also portions of San Diego Freeway (before the freeway was built) south of El Toro Y went up changing the U.S. 101 signs to Interstate 5 in 1964, including full length of Golden State Freeway which was originally signed as US 99.

=== Interstate 105 (1964–1968) ===
Interstate 105
- Location: Los Angeles
- Existed: 1964–1968

From 1964 to 1968, the I-105 designation was used on a stretch of road linking I-5/I-10, US 101, and SR 10 (former I-110) north of downtown Los Angeles, now known as the East Los Angeles Interchange. In 1968, this I-105 was decommissioned, and that portion of the Santa Ana Freeway was folded into US 101.

== Exit list ==
Except where prefixed with a letter, postmiles were measured on the road as it was in 1964, based on the alignment that existed at the time, and do not necessarily reflect current mileage. R reflects a realignment in the route since then, M indicates a second realignment, L refers to an overlap due to a correction or change, and T indicates postmiles classified as temporary. Segments that remain unconstructed or have been relinquished to local control may be omitted. The numbers reset at county lines; the start and end postmiles in each county are given in the county column.

County	Location	Postmile	Exit	Destinations	Notes
Orange	Irvine	21.30	—	I-5 south (San Diego Freeway) – San Diego	Continuation beyond I-405
Orange	Irvine	21.30	94A	I-405 north (San Diego Freeway north) to SR 133 south – Long Beach	Northbound exit and southbound entrance; south end of Santa Ana Freeway; south end of I-5 overlap
See I-5 Exits 94A–134
Los Angeles	Los Angeles	16.88 S0.00 (Note: Indicates that the postmile represents the distance along US 101 rather than I-5.)	—	I-5 north (Golden State Freeway) / I-10 – Sacramento, San Bernardino, Santa Monica	North end of I-5 overlap; south end of US 101 overlap; no access from I-5 north to US 101 north, and vice versa
See US 101 Exits 1–3
Los Angeles	Los Angeles	1.57	3 (Note: Exit numbers follow US 101 rather than I-5.)	SR 110 to I-110 south (Harbor Freeway) / Grand Avenue – Pasadena, San Pedro	North end of Santa Ana Freeway; north end of US 101 overlap
Los Angeles	Los Angeles	1.57	—	US 101 north (Hollywood Freeway) – Ventura	Continuation beyond SR 110
1.000 mi = 1.609 km; 1.000 km = 0.621 mi: Concurrency terminus; Incomplete access
