= El Toro Y =

Highway interchange in Orange County, California

El Toro "Y"
- El Toro Interchange, The "Y"
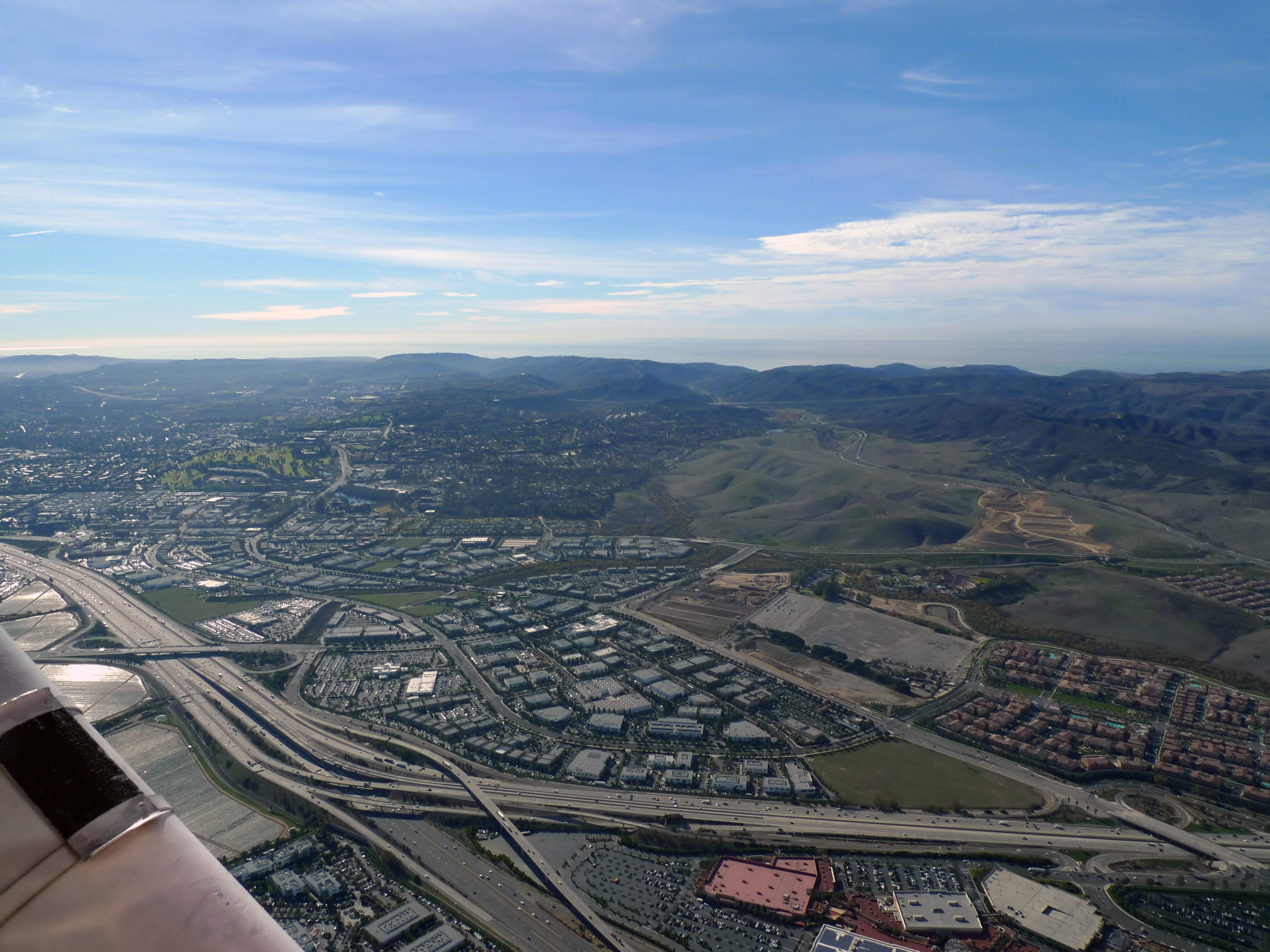
- Aerial view of the El Toro Y
- Interactive map of El Toro "Y"

Location
- Irvine, California
- Coordinates: 33°38′41″N 117°44′07″W
- Roads at junction: I-5; I-405

Construction
- Maintained by: Caltrans

The El Toro "Y" is a freeway interchange in Irvine, California where the Santa Ana Freeway, Interstate 5 (I-5), and the San Diego Freeway (at that point the I-405) merge. South of the El Toro Y, the highway is named the "San Diego Freeway" with the highway designation "I-5." Located in south Orange County, the interchange was named after the nearby city El Toro (now Lake Forest), and the now-closed Marine Corps Air Station El Toro, located northeast of the interchange.

Principally, it can be seen as splitting northbound traffic from south Orange County and San Diego County into the Los Angeles area's two major north–south routes: I-5, which heads through the center of Orange County towards Downtown Los Angeles, and I-405, which serves the area's western parts. The "Y" is one of the busiest interchanges in the world; from 1975 to 2002, daily traffic surged from 102,000 to 356,000 vehicles a day.

The "Y" was where American broadcast reporter Zoey Tur of KCBS-TV, via news helicopter, first located and broadcast O.J. Simpson's white Ford Bronco slow-speed police chase northbound exclusively for 22 minutes on June 17, 1994. In the cleft of the "Y" lies the Irvine Spectrum Center.

== History ==
By the early 1990s, the El Toro Y had become one of the most congested freeway interchanges in the world, its severe overcrowding fed by a housing boom in southern Orange County.

In November 1990, Orange County voters approved Measure M, a half-cent increase in the county sales tax to finance transportation improvements. In 1993, the California Department of Transportation (Caltrans) began a massive expansion project, adding a new interchange and collector/distributor roads at Bake Parkway (signed as truck bypass lanes) and Lake Forest Drive, and carpool lanes and connectors. The $166-million project also vastly increased regular traffic lanes. The project increased the number of vehicles per day from 300,000 to 400,000. After the project was completed in 1997, the El Toro Y stood as one of the widest roads in the world, at 26 traffic lanes wide.

The traffic delays at the interchange sparked the construction of several parallel bypass toll roads. The San Joaquin Hills Toll Road, designated State Route 73 (SR 73), opened in November 1996 and connects San Juan Capistrano and Costa Mesa. Another parallel road to the El Toro Y is SR 241, the Foothill Toll Road, and the free southern extension, known as "Los Patrones Parkway", that currently ends at Cow Camp Road near SR 74. An extension is planned from Cow Camp Road to Avenida La Pata (Antonio Parkway) in San Clemente in the near future.

SR 241 was proposed to connect to I-5 in northern San Diego County, but local opposition regarding environmental issues near Trestles have put the project on hold. In 2017, the Transportation Corridor Agencies considered extending SR 241 to San Clemente. However, residents opposed the proposed route because it would have cost $2 billion, would have intersected at the busiest interchange in San Clemente, Avenida Pico, would have demolished many new homes with real estate value, would have been constructed next to a high school, and would waste taxpayers’ money because the interchange had undergone improvements between 2015 and 2018. Local residents also say that traffic would be worse, equivalent to the SR 91 and SR 241 interchange.

The Irvine Spectrum Center, a large shopping center featuring a movie theater, numerous shopping destinations and a large obelisk, which conceals a cell phone and television tower inside of it, is in the cleft of the Y.

On July 29, 2008, a moderate earthquake centered in Chino Hills caused damage to an expansion joint on one of the overpasses in the interchange. Caltrans closed the 5 Southbound Truck Bypass/Bake Parkway/Lake Forest exit to replace the expansion joint that was damaged during the quake.

== In popular culture ==
The El Toro Y was referenced the 2011 episode "Angry Dad: the Movie" of the animated sitcom The Simpsons, when Bart gives Homer a list of "Must-See Attractions" in Los Angeles.

In the third episode of The People v. O. J. Simpson: American Crime Story, it was initially reported that O. J. Simpson was spotted in Al Cowlings's Ford Bronco on Interstate 405 at Irvine Center Drive at the El Toro Y. However, the scenes were shot elsewhere in Los Angeles.
