= California State Route 259 =

Highway in California

State Route 259
- SR 259 highlighted in red

Route information
- Maintained by Caltrans
- Length: 1.48 mi (2.38 km)
- Existed: 1968–present

Major junctions
- South end: I-215 in San Bernardino
- North end: SR 210 in San Bernardino

Location
- Country: United States
- State: California
- Counties: San Bernardino

Highway system
- State highways in California; Interstate; US; State; Scenic; History; Pre‑1964; Unconstructed; Deleted; Freeways
← SR 255	→ SR 260

State Route 259 (SR 259) is an approximately 1.48-mile (2.38 km) state highway in the U.S. state of California, serving as a freeway connector between I-215 and SR 210 in San Bernardino. It has one complete interchange (Highland Avenue) and one partial interchange (E Street, northbound only).

== Route description ==
Route 259 is defined in section 559 of the California Streets and Highways Code, and that the highway is "from Route 215 to Route 210 in San Bernardino".

SR 259 splits off from I-215 as a full freeway and continues north, interchanging with Highland Avenue. SR 259 then turns east and has a partial interchange with E Street before merging with SR 210. SR 259 thus provides a route for traffic to move between I-215 northbound and SR 210 eastbound as well as from SR 210 westbound to I-215 southbound; the interchange between SR 210 and I-215 does not provide these movements.

Almost all signage along the route either mention "To I-215 south" or "To SR 210 east" instead of SR 259, including the exits from SR 210 and I-215, respectively, the freeway entrances from Highland Avenue, and an overhead guide sign along northbound SR 259. Since 2022, Caltrans had erected SR 259 reassurance markers just beyond the start of the entrance ramps from SR 210 and I-215.

SR 259 is part of the California Freeway and Expressway System, and is a freeway for its entire length, and is part of the National Highway System, a network of highways that are considered essential to the country's economy, defense, and mobility by the Federal Highway Administration.

== History ==
The portion of SR 30 between I-215 and SR 259 did not exist in the 1960s-70s, and traffic used SR 259, which was then designated as SR 30. Before its role as a state highway, the route followed by SR 259 formed a portion of the Santa Fe "Kite-Shaped Track" which looped throughout Southern California, including through communities of the eastern San Bernardino Valley.

== Exit list ==
The entire route is in San Bernardino, San Bernardino County.

mi	km	Exit	Destinations	Notes
0.00	0.00		I-215 south (San Bernardino Freeway) – Riverside	No access to I-215 north; southern terminus; I-215 exit 45; former I-15E
0.00	0.00	45 (Note: Exit number follows I-215 rather than SR 259.)	Base Line Street	Southbound exit and northbound entrance
1.45	2.33	1A	Highland Avenue	Signed as exit 1B southbound
1.50	2.41	1B	E Street	Northbound exit and southbound entrance; former SR 206
1.50	2.41		SR 210 east (Foothill Freeway) – Highland	No access to SR 210 west; northern terminus; future I-210; SR 210 west exit 75B
1.000 mi = 1.609 km; 1.000 km = 0.621 mi: Incomplete access
