= San Diego Freeway =

The San Diego Freeway is one of the named principal Southern California freeways. It consists of the following two segments:

- Interstate 5, from California State Route 94 in San Diego to Interstate 405 (El Toro Y) in Irvine
- Interstate 405, in its entirety from Interstate 5 in Irvine to Interstate 5 near San Fernando
