= California State Route 74 =

State highway in California

State Route 74
- SR 74 highlighted in red; the gap represents the relinquished portions (as of 2017)

Route information
- Maintained by Caltrans
- Length: 93.03 mi (149.72 km) Portions of SR 74 have been relinquished to or are otherwise maintained by local or other governments, and are not included in the length.
- Existed: 1934–present
- Tourist routes: Pines to Palms Scenic Byway

Major junctions
- West end: I-5 in San Juan Capistrano
- I-15 in Lake Elsinore; I-215 in Perris; SR 79 in Hemet; SR 243 near Mountain Center; SR 371 near Anza
- East end: The Palm Desert line

Location
- Country: United States
- State: California
- Counties: Orange, Riverside

Highway system
- State highways in California; Interstate; US; State; Scenic; History; Pre‑1964; Unconstructed; Deleted; Freeways
← SR 73	→ SR 75

State Route 74 (SR 74), part of which forms the Palms to Pines Scenic Byway or Pines to Palms Highway, and the Ortega Highway, is a state highway in the U.S. state of California. It runs from Interstate 5 in San Juan Capistrano in Orange County to the city limits of Palm Desert in Riverside County. Stretching about 93 miles (150 km), it passes through several parks and National Forests between the Pacific coast and the Coachella Valley. Though some maps and signs may still mark SR 74 as continuous between the cities of Lake Elsinore and Perris, and extending to State Route 111 in Palm Desert, control of segments within those cities were relinquished to those local jurisdictions and are thus no longer officially part of the state highway system.

== Route description ==
Route 74 is defined in section 374, subdivision (a), of the California Streets and Highways Code:

Route 74 is from:
(1) Route 5 near San Juan Capistrano to Route 15 near Lake Elsinore.
(2) Route 215 near Perris to the southern city limit of Palm Desert.

The definition omits the concurrency with Route 215 instead of duplicating that segment in the other route's definition in the code. And while control of former portions of Route 74 have been relinquished by the state to the cities of Lake Elsinore, Perris, and Palm Desert, subdivision (b) further mandates that those cities must still "maintain within their respective jurisdictions signs directing motorists to the continuation of Route 74". Subdivisions (c) and (d) further permit the state to relinquish control of the remaining segment of Route 74 within Lake Elsinore's borders west of Route 15, and the segment within Hemet, respectively.

SR 74 begins at an interchange with I-5 in the city of San Juan Capistrano and heads east as the Ortega Highway, loosely paralleling San Juan Creek. The highway leaves the San Juan Capistrano city limits and turns northeast, going through the community of Rancho Mission Viejo and entering Ronald W. Caspers Wilderness Park and eventually Cleveland National Forest. After going through San Juan Hot Springs, SR 74 enters Riverside County.

The highway continues winding through the Santa Ana Mountains and passes through the community of El Cariso before descending into the city of Lake Elsinore. SR 74 continues northwest on Grand Avenue before continuing northeast on Riverside Drive and continuing along the shore of Lake Elsinore. The road continues southeast on Collier Avenue before continuing northeast on Central Avenue and intersecting I-15. SR 74 leaves the city of Lake Elsinore and continues through unincorporated Riverside County before turning east and entering Perris. After traveling through downtown, SR 74 merges with I-215 and runs concurrently with I-215 before exiting the freeway as Matthews Road.

SR 74 travels southeast through the Romoland area of Menifee and turns east to become Pinacate Road, continuing through Homeland and Green Acres before running concurrently with SR 79 as Florida Avenue through Hemet. SR 79 splits off and heads north towards San Jacinto while SR 74 continues through East Hemet and Valle Vista before entering the San Bernardino National Forest. The Palms to Pines Highway parallels San Jacinto Creek as it winds through the mountains before intersecting SR 243 in Mountain Center and providing access to the Hemet Reservoir. SR 74 follows the Garner Valley Wash through Garner Valley before meeting the eastern terminus of SR 371. The road crosses the Santa Rosa Indian Reservation before going through the communities of Ribbonwood and Pinyon Pines and turning north along Deep Canyon and becoming the western boundary of the University of California Desert Research Area.

As the highway descends to the Coachella Valley area, it parallels Carrizo Creek before entering the city limits of Palm Desert, where SR 74 meets its current legal eastern terminus. The SR 74 designation continued into Palm Desert as a city arterial to its eastern terminus at SR 111, which has also had its state highway designation removed through Palm Desert.

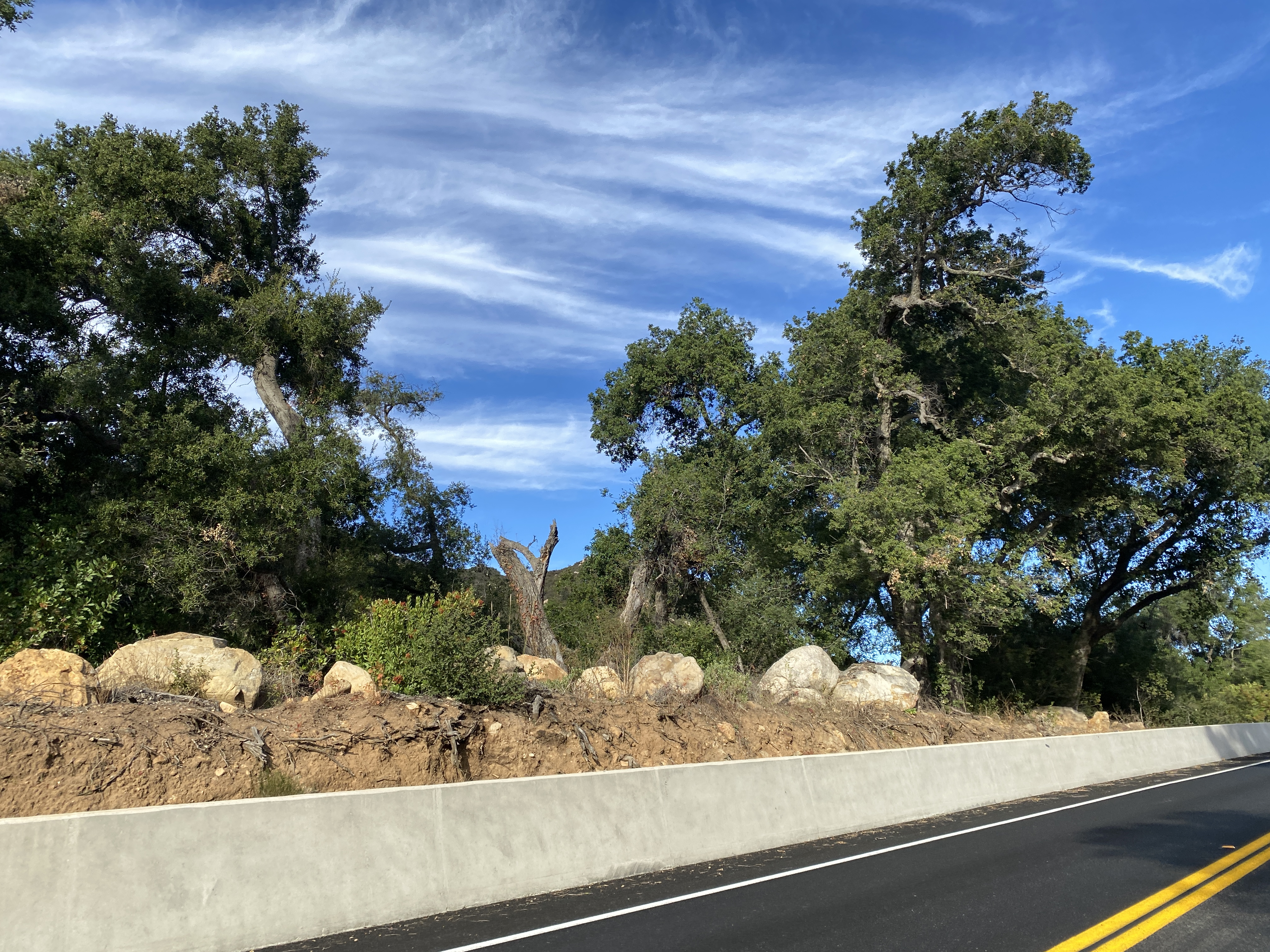
Oak woodland along Ortega Highway near Cleveland National Forest

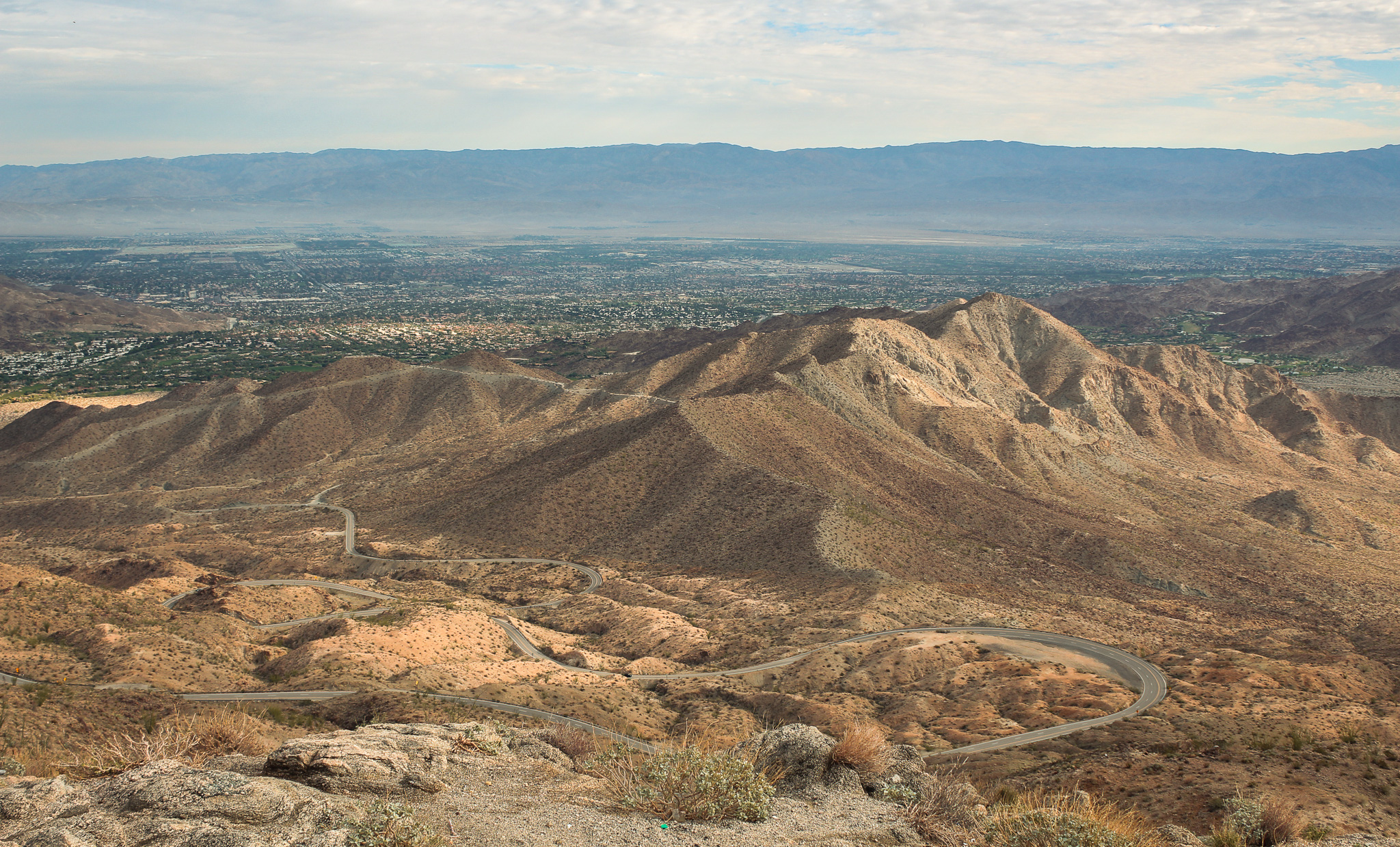
View from the Pines to Palms Highway looking out over the Coachella Valley.

Route 74 passes through many parks and National Forests along its route. Some of these places include the San Bernardino National Forest, the Cleveland National Forest, the Ronald W. Caspers Wilderness Park, Lake Elsinore State Recreation Park, the Soboba Indian Reservation, Lake Hemet, Santa Rosa Indian Reservation, and Santa Rosa and San Jacinto Mountains National Monument.

SR 74 is part of the California Freeway and Expressway System, and for a portion near I-15 as well as from I-215 to the eastern Hemet city limits is part of the National Highway System, a network of highways that are considered essential to the country's economy, defense, and mobility by the Federal Highway Administration. SR 74 is eligible for the State Scenic Highway System; however, it is only a scenic highway as designated by Caltrans from the western boundary of the San Bernardino National Forest to its junction with SR 111. State Route 74 is called the California Wildland Firefighters Memorial Highway (from Lake Elsinore to San Juan Capistrano), as designated by various state laws. The Palms to Pines Scenic Byway is a National Forest Scenic Byway.

== History ==
SR 740 became part of SR 74 when the highway was extended east

SR 74 ran alongside US 395 in Perris

The route has been signed as Route 74 since the establishment of state routes in 1934. Its original corridor between then CA 71 Corona Freeway (later I-15W) and present-day I-215 (then, I-15E and U.S. Route 395) was numbered as U.S. 395, through downtown Perris. East of the CA 74/U.S. 395 junction, from Romoland-east, was CA 740 (Florida Avenue).

The western portion of Route 74 in Orange County follows San Juan Creek and is named the Ortega Highway, after the Spanish explorer Sgt. José Francisco Ortega who led the scouts of the 1769 Portola expedition, first non-natives to ever see the area.

Route 74 between San Juan Capistrano and Lake Elsinore, due to its narrow width and high traffic volume, is known as one of the most dangerous highways in the state.

California's legislature has relinquished state control of the segments of SR 74 within Lake Elsinore's borders east of I-15, in Perris, and in Palm Desert, and turned it over to local control. This includes deleting from the highway code an unconstructed segment that would have extended SR 74 from SR 111 in Palm Desert to Interstate 10.

On August 11, 1930, the Riverside County Board of Supervisors officially named the highway "from San Jacinto Mountains to the Desert" as the Palms to Pines Highway.

== In media ==
- A segment of Route 74 named "Seven Level Hill," just south of Palm Desert, California, appears in the 1963 American comedy film It's A Mad, Mad, Mad, Mad World during the opening minutes of the film, when the major characters of the film meet for the first time following a car accident (near mile marker 87).
- Scenes from the 1954 American comedy film The Long, Long Trailer were shot on the Pines to Palms Scenic Byway (State Route 74) in Palm Desert.
- The rock band Kyuss, which formed in Palm Desert, titled the opening track of their 1991 debut album Wretch, "(Beginning of What's About to Happen) Hwy. 74".

== Major intersections ==
Except where prefixed with a letter, postmiles were measured on the road as it was in 1964, based on the alignment that existed at the time, and do not necessarily reflect current mileage. Postmile prefixes include: R reflecting a realignment in the route since then, M indicating a second realignment, L referring to an overlap due to a correction or change, and T indicating postmiles classified as temporary. Segments that remain unconstructed or have been relinquished to local control may be omitted. The numbers reset at county lines; the start and end postmiles in each county are given in the county column.

County	Location	Postmile	Destinations	Notes
Orange; ORA 0.00-15.60	San Juan Capistrano	0.00	Ortega Highway (to Camino Capistrano)	Continuation beyond I-5
Orange; ORA 0.00-15.60	San Juan Capistrano	0.00	I-5 (San Diego Freeway) – Los Angeles, San Diego	Interchange; western terminus of SR 74; I-5 exit 82
Orange; ORA 0.00-15.60	San Juan Capistrano	2.6	Avenida La Pata, Antonio Parkway to SR 241 Toll north – Ladera Ranch	Access to SR 241 toll road via northbound Antonio Parkway, eastbound Cow Camp Road and northbound Los Patrones Parkway
Riverside; RIV 0.00-96.01	Lake Elsinore	11.83	Grand Avenue – Lakeland Village	
Riverside; RIV 0.00-96.01	Lake Elsinore	17.24	I-15 (Temecula Valley Freeway) – Corona, San Diego	Interchange; I-15 exit 77; east end of state maintenance
Riverside; RIV 0.00-96.01	Perris	27.53 26.31 (Note: Indicates that the postmile represents the distance along I-215 rather than SR 74.)	I-215 north (Escondido Freeway) / Redlands Avenue – Riverside	Interchange; west end of I-215 overlap; former I-15E north / US 395 north; I-215 exit 17
Riverside; RIV 0.00-96.01	Perris	27.53 26.31	West end of freeway on I-215 / West end of state maintenance	
Riverside; RIV 0.00-96.01	Perris	23.54 27.54	East end of freeway on I-215	
Riverside; RIV 0.00-96.01	Perris	23.54 27.54	I-215 south (Escondido Freeway) – San Diego	Interchange; east end of I-215 overlap; former I-15E south / US 395 south; I-215 exit 15
Riverside; RIV 0.00-96.01	Green Acres	34.33	SR 79 south (Winchester Road) / Vista Place – Winchester, San Diego	West end of SR 79 overlap
Riverside; RIV 0.00-96.01	Hemet	36.92	Warren Road	Serves Hemet-Ryan Airport
Riverside; RIV 0.00-96.01	Hemet	40.59	CR R3 (State Street) – Sage, Aguanga, San Jacinto	Northern terminus of CR R3 (State Street continues north to San Jacinto)
Riverside; RIV 0.00-96.01	Hemet	41.34	SR 79 north (San Jacinto Street) – San Jacinto	East end of SR 79 overlap
Riverside; RIV 0.00-96.01	Valle Vista	44.74	Ramona Expressway	
Riverside; RIV 0.00-96.01	Mountain Center	59.25	SR 243 north – Idyllwild, Banning	
Riverside; RIV 0.00-96.01	Mountain Center	61.10	Keen Camp Summit, elevation 4,917 feet (1,499 m)	
Riverside; RIV 0.00-96.01		71.75	SR 371 west – Anza, San Diego	Former SR 71
Riverside; RIV 0.00-96.01	Palm Desert	92.26	East end of state maintenance at Palm Desert southern city limit	
Riverside; RIV 0.00-96.01	Palm Desert	96.01	SR 111 – Palm Springs, Los Angeles, Indio	
Riverside; RIV 0.00-96.01	Palm Desert	96.01	Monterey Avenue	Continuation beyond SR 111; eastern terminus of SR 74
1.000 mi = 1.609 km; 1.000 km = 0.621 mi: Concurrency terminus
