= Riverside Freeway =

The Riverside Freeway is one of the named principal Southern California freeways. It consists of the following segments:

- State Route 91, from Interstate 5 in Buena Park to State Route 60 in Riverside
- Interstate 215, from State Route 60 in Riverside to Interstate 10 in San Bernardino
