= Barstow Freeway =

The Barstow Freeway is one of the named principal Southern California freeways. It consists of the following segments:

- Interstate 215, from Highland Avenue to Interstate 15 in San Bernardino
- Interstate 15, from Interstate 215 to the Nevada state line
