= Orange Crush interchange =

Interchange in California

- The Crush
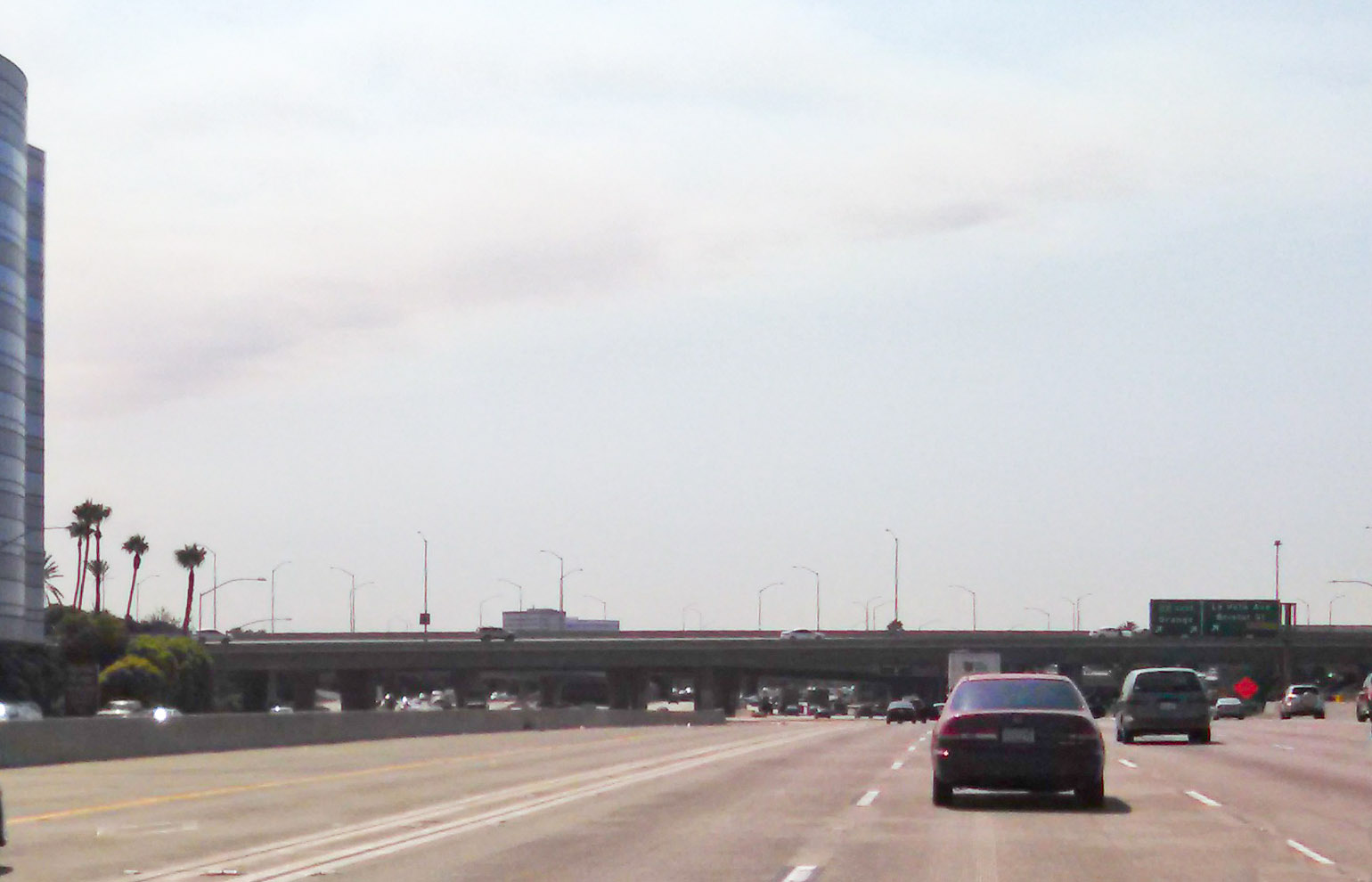
- Orange Crush Interchange, from I-5 Southbound
- Interactive map of Orange Crush interchange

Location
- Orange, California; Santa Ana, California
- Coordinates: 33°46′48″N 117°52′45″W
- Roads at junction: I-5 SR 22 SR 57

Construction
- Type: Hybrid Interchange
- Spans: 13
- Lanes: 34
- Constructed: by Department of Public Works
- Opened: 1959
- Maximum width: 8,290 ft (2,530 m)
- Maintained by: Caltrans
- Tolls: None

The Orange Crush interchange, frequently called The Crush, is a freeway interchange in the cities of Orange and Santa Ana, California, near the city limits of the cities of Anaheim and Garden Grove. The Disneyland Resort, The Outlets at Orange, St. Joseph Hospital, Children's Hospital of Orange County, the UCI Medical Center, Westfield MainPlace, Angel Stadium of Anaheim, Honda Center, OC Vibe, Platinum Triangle, and the Lamaroux Justice Center of the Superior Court of California of the County of Orange are all located at or near the interchange.

This interchange of the Santa Ana (Interstate 5), Garden Grove (State Route 22), and Orange (State Route 57) freeways was listed in the 2002 Guinness World Records book as the most complex road interchange in the world. The name of the interchange, credited to KNX Radio traffic and weather reporter Bill Keene, is a play on the name of the Orange Crush soda.

== Description ==
The interchange comprises four freeway segments and 13 bridges (i.e. there are five freeway "paths" of travel into the complex) of three major highways:

- I-5 (Santa Ana Freeway) – Los Angeles, Santa Ana
- SR 22 (Garden Grove Freeway) – Long Beach, Garden Grove, Orange
- SR 57 north (Orange Freeway) – Pomona

The 2002 edition of the Guinness World Records book cites this as the most complex road interchange in the world, stating that it is an intersection of 34 different routes, when taking into account collector/distributor roads, surrounding on- and off-ramps (such as Bristol Street/La Veta Avenue, Broadway/Main Street), and direct carpool-to-carpool flyovers. Adding to the complexity is that of the five possible directions to enter the interchange, entering eastbound on SR-22 is the only approach that allows motorists to exit the interchange in all possible directions of travel. This is a result of the acute intersecting angles of SR-57 and I-5, as well as the fact that the interchange is approximately 3 miles (4.8 km) from SR-22's eastern terminus at SR-55, which also intersects I-5 several miles south of the Orange Crush.

In addition, although it is not a vehicular road, the Santa Ana River coincidentally crosses I-5 at the Orange Crush area, forming a large "X" visible from space imagery in the heart of Orange County. Its bike path offers bicyclists an alternative route through the Orange Crush, avoiding signals backed up with vehicles getting on or off freeways there during rush hour. Normal traffic is exacerbated during game times for the Angels or Ducks, whose home venues (Angel Stadium and the Honda Center, respectively) lie in very close proximity to the Crush.

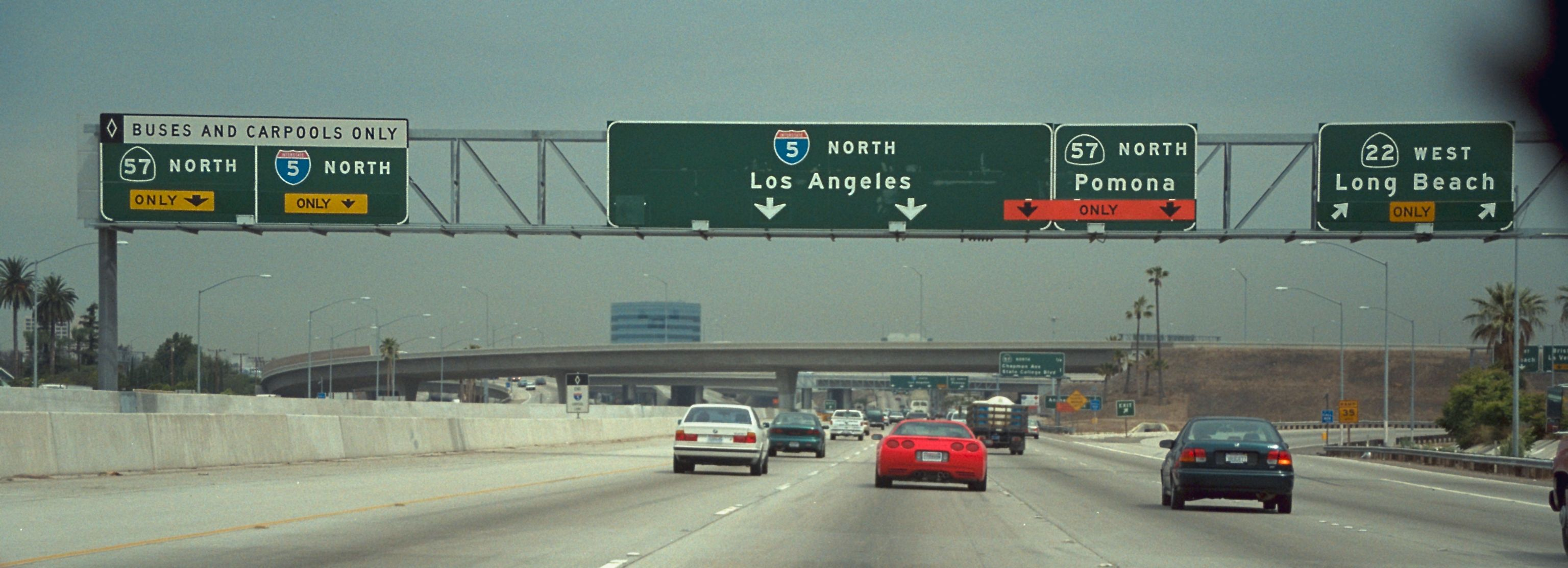
I-5 northbound at the Orange Crush

== History ==
Significant construction funded by Measure M in the late 1990s and early 2000s has greatly added capacity and increased the safety of motorists traveling through the interchange. Most of the transitions were re-aligned and/or widened during this reconstruction, including the addition of HOV transitions between SR 57 and I-5. Prior to and since its reconstruction, driving through was and is challenging and, combined with heavy traffic volume, has resulted in frustrating traffic congestion, hence the name "Orange Crush."

In late 2004 the Orange County Transportation Authority began a construction project to widen the entire length of SR 22, including the stretch through the Orange Crush Interchange. This project also added new HOV lanes to SR 22, but no direct HOV connectors from I-5 to SR 22 were constructed. Construction called for the closing of the connector from eastbound SR 22 to southbound I-5 for one year, from November 2005 to November 2006. The project was completed at the end of November 2006.
