= Escondido Freeway =

The Escondido Freeway is one of the named principal Southern California freeways. It consists of the following segments:

- California State Route 15, from Interstate 5 southeast of downtown San Diego and Interstate 8 in San Diego
- Interstate 15, from Interstate 8 in San Diego to Interstate 215 in Murrieta
- Interstate 215, from Interstate 15 in Murrieta to California State Route 60 east of Riverside
