= Interstate 215 (California) =

Interstate highway in California

Interstate 215
- I-215 highlighted in red

Route information
- Auxiliary route of I-15
- Maintained by Caltrans
- Length: 55.060 mi (88.610 km)
- Existed: 1982–present
- History: 1960s as a highway, 1982 as a number
- NHS: Entire route

Major junctions
- South end: I-15 in Murrieta
- SR 74 in Perris; SR 60 / SR 91 in Riverside; I-10 in Colton; SR 210 in San Bernardino
- North end: I-15 near San Bernardino

Location
- Country: United States
- State: California
- Counties: Riverside, San Bernardino

Highway system
- Interstate Highway System; Main; Auxiliary; Suffixed; Business; Future; State highways in California; Interstate; US; State; Scenic; History; Pre‑1964; Unconstructed; Deleted; Freeways
← SR 214	→ SR 216

Interstate 215 (I-215) is a 54.5-mile-long (87.7 km) north–south auxiliary Interstate Highway in the Inland Empire region of Southern California. It has portions designated as the Barstow, Escondido, and Armed Forces Freeways. I-215 is a bypass auxiliary route of I-15, running from Murrieta to northern San Bernardino. While I-215 connects the city centers of both Riverside and San Bernardino, its parent I-15 runs to the west through Corona and Ontario.

Part of I-215 was once signed as Interstate 15E (I-15E), but this was changed in 1974 as almost all of the Interstates around the country with directional suffixes were eventually renumbered or eliminated.

== Route description ==
The entirety of I-215 is defined in section 515 of the California Streets and Highways Code as Route 215, and that the highway is from "Route 15 near Temecula to Route 15 near Devore via Riverside and San Bernardino". This definition corresponds with the Federal Highway Administration (FHWA)'s route logs of I-215.

The southern terminus of I-215 is at the junction of I-15 in the city of Murrieta, in southwestern Riverside County. It then runs north through Menifee and northwest through Perris, passing March Air Reserve Base before joining State Route 60 (SR 60) in Riverside, near the Moreno Valley city limits. From just north of downtown Perris to eastern Riverside near the Central Avenue interchange, the tracks of Metrolink's 91/Perris Valley Line run along the freeway.

I-215 overlaps with SR 60 for about 5 miles (8.0 km) in Riverside while passing through the campus of UC Riverside and splits from it at SR 91 near downtown Riverside. It then travels north through Colton, Grand Terrace, and San Bernardino before turning northwest and rejoining I-15 near the small San Bernardino neighborhood of Devore.

This route is an alternative to I-15 for drivers traveling from Phoenix, Las Vegas, or San Bernardino, to the San Diego metropolitan area. This route offers a slight distance advantage as an alternative to I-15's alignment about 10 miles (16 km) to the west of (and roughly parallel to) I-215. The distance between the two I-15/I-215 junctions is almost 6 miles (9.7 km) shorter using I-215 rather than I-15.

However, the traffic and time "advantage" on I-215 is limited by three factors: the segment between the I-15/I-215 "Devore junction" and north of SR 210 in San Bernardino only has two lanes in each direction (while I-15 has four), its co-designation with SR 60 and routing through Riverside requires motorists in both directions to "change freeways" to remain on I-215, and that most of I-215 has a 65 mph (105 km/h) speed limit (except for a short segment in northern San Bernardino north of Palm Avenue, which has a 70 mph (110 km/h) speed limit).

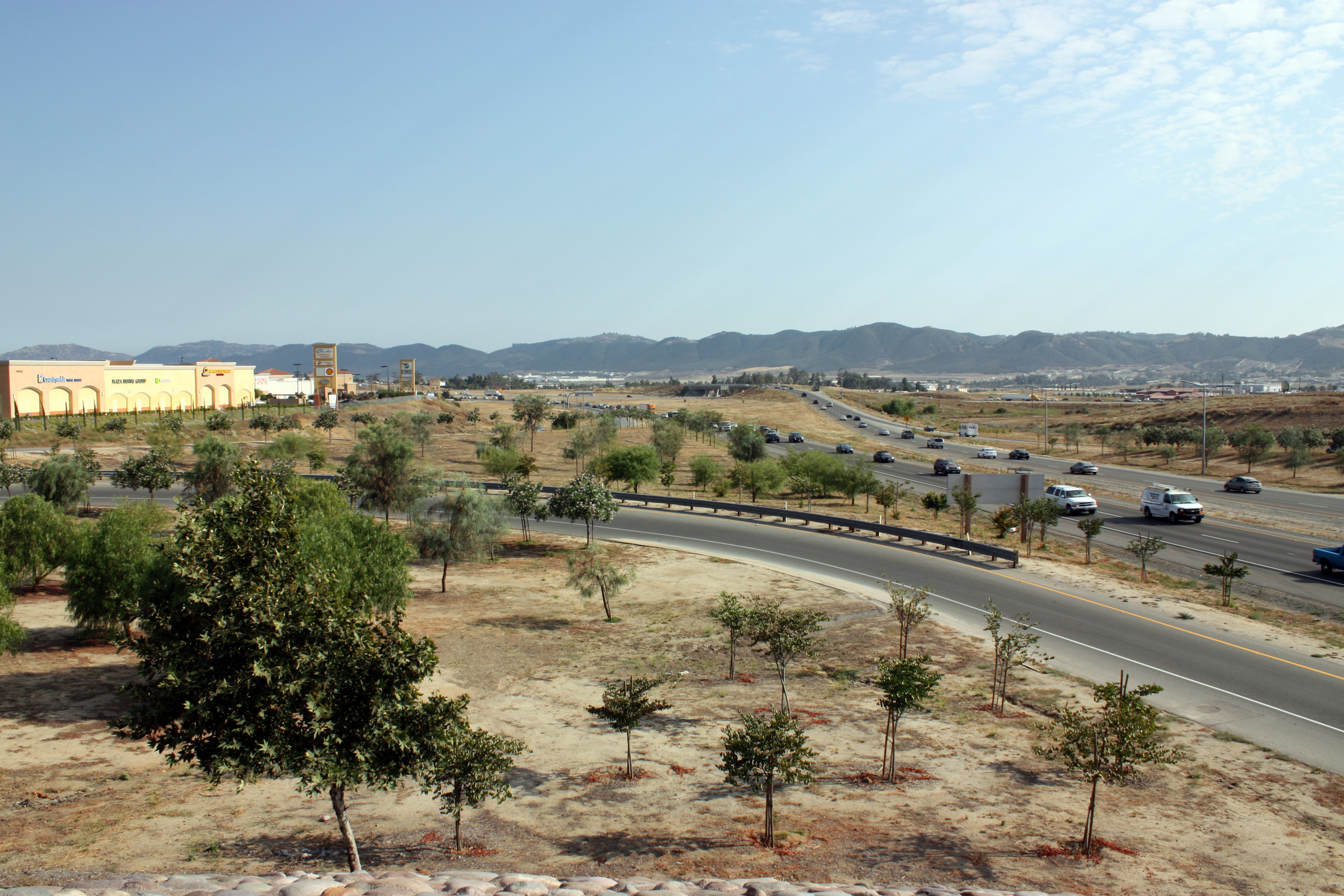
The junction of I-15 and I-215 in Murrieta

I-215 is also used by local residents as the major north–south route for the urbanized portions of the San Bernardino–Riverside–Ontario metropolitan area. (I-15 serves a similar function in the western portion of the metropolitan area; the two are the only continuous north–south freeways in the area.)

I-215 is part of the California Freeway and Expressway System, and is part of the National Highway System, a network of highways that are considered essential to the country's economy, defense, and mobility by the Federal Highway Administration. I-215 is eligible for the State Scenic Highway System, but it is not officially designated as a scenic highway by the California Department of Transportation. On January 24, 1957, the State Highway Commission defined the Escondido Freeway as what is now Routes 15 and 215 from Route 805 to Route 91. This entire segment was previously Route 395 when it was named. From the SR 60 / SR 91 interchange in Riverside to I-10 near San Bernardino, the highway is known as the Riverside Freeway. From I-10 to SR 210, I-215 is known as the San Bernardino Freeway. Between Highland Avenue in San Bernardino and its northern terminus, I-215 is named the Barstow Freeway. Unofficially, I-215 is known as the Armed Forces Freeway between I-15 and SR 60, given its proximity to the March Air Reserve Base.

== History ==
Interstate 15E
- Location: Murrieta-San Bernardino
- Existed: 1972–1974

State Route 194
- Location: Murrieta-San Bernardino
- Existed: 1974–1982

State Route 215
- Location: Murrieta-Riverside
- Existed: 1982–1994

The highway (not an Interstate) that is currently I-215 first opened in 1963 as part of U.S. Route 395 (US 395). The "mileposts" in Riverside County reflect this since they do not start at zero at the I-15 interchange in Murrieta. Around 1968, US 395 was renumbered as I-15 (the original proposed route, as SR 71's proposed number was I-15W / SR 31 Hamner-Milliken). This segment of US 395 was again renumbered in 1972 as (Temporary) I-15E. Next, in 1974, this route was renumbered as State Route 194. In 1982, this route was then renumbered as I-215 north of SR 60, and as State Route 215 south of SR 60. Once SR 215 was upgraded to Interstate Highway standards, it became part of I-215 in 1994. Prior to its upgrade to Interstate standards, there were traffic signals at SR 74, as well as at Alessandro Boulevard. Two railroad crossings had also intersected the I-215 expressway at SR 74 and south of Cactus Avenue at then–March Air Force Base.

Due to the fact that the I-215 designation was overlaid upon existing freeways between the southern junction with SR 60 and the city of San Bernardino, the SR 60 / SR 91 / I-215 interchange in the city of Riverside has been widely known for its confusing nature concerning the numbering of I-215. While SR 60 continues east-and-west through this interchange, and SR 91 continues southwest (and formerly to the north), the I-215 designation continues away from this interchange on SR 60 east and the former northern portion of SR 91 (now solely numbered I-215). Travelers following I-215 in either direction need to "change freeways" at this interchange, instead of just following through lanes. The interchange was reconstructed to include some high-speed flyovers, one of which carries I-215 southbound traffic. In addition, when I-215 temporarily cosigns SR 60 in Riverside, the mileposts for I-215 supersede mileposts for SR 60. Motorists traveling east–west on SR 60 must begin counting exits at a new number, in the reverse order, during the I-215 overlap.

=== San Bernardino widening project ===
A joint project between Caltrans and SANBAG of San Bernardino County to widen I-215 between Orange Show Road and University Parkway in San Bernardino began in 2007. With its completion, the project added one general use lane and one carpool lane in each direction, bringing the total number of lanes from six to 10 lanes across. The 7.5-mile (12.1 km), $723 million expansion project included the reconstruction of all underpasses and overpasses within the project as well as connector ramps between I-215 and SR 210. The widening was completed in late 2013, and all construction signage and equipment were completely removed by spring of 2014.

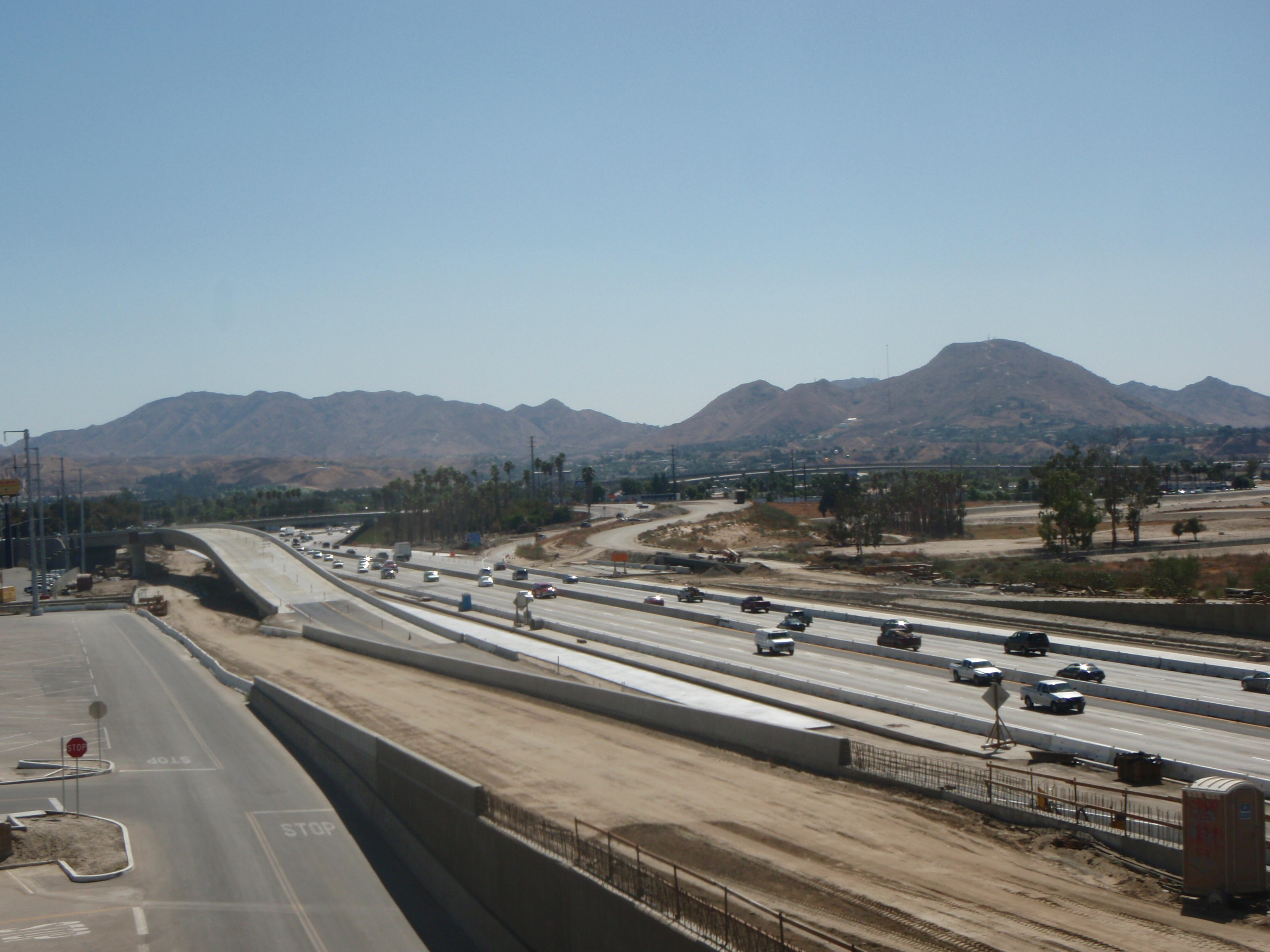
Construction between Inland Center Drive and Orange Show Road in San Bernardino

- Phase 1: Reconstruction of 5th Street Bridge. Work began in January 2007 and was completed in November 2008, approximately six months ahead of schedule and $2 million under budget. The 5th Street bridge was built in phases with the new bridge being constructed alongside the old structure to allow for continuous use of the east/west corridor during construction.
- Phase 2: Freeway widening between Orange Show Road and Rialto Avenue. Construction began on Phase 2 in December 2007 and was completed in July 2010. In addition to the reconstruction of various bridges, the freeway was widened from three to five lanes in each direction through this stretch of road. Aesthetic wallscapes depict the City’s iconic symbols, including palm trees, the San Bernardino mountain range, fountains representing the local springs, and more.
- Phase 3: Freeway widening between Rialto Avenue to Massachusetts Avenue. Construction began in September 2009 and finished in mid-2013. This phase received $128 million in American Recovery and Reinvestment Act of 2009 (ARRA) funds, one of the largest allocations of funding to a construction project in the country. As part of this phase, the freeway was widened from three to five lanes in each direction along with the reconstruction of various bridges and underpasses. Following construction completion, all fast-lane entrances and exits were eliminated with drivers using new 5th Street and Baseline Street onramps that connect directly to the newly constructed bridges. This new configuration provides more balanced access to the west and east sides of the city. Also, residents living alongside the northbound side of the freeway have a sound wall to help block out freeway noise.
- Phase 4: freeway widening between Massachusetts Avenue and University Parkway. Construction began in January 2010 and was completed in November 2012. A key feature in this phase was the construction of I-215 / SR 210 connector ramps. Drivers now have direct access to these freeways in all directions. In addition to a general-purpose and carpool lane added in each direction south of the I-215 / SR 210 interchange, a southbound auxiliary lane and a northbound general-purpose lane were added between University Parkway and the I-215 / SR 210 interchange.

== Future ==
Many improvements are in the works along the entire length of the I-215 corridor. Several interchanges are planned to be built or reconstructed, such as the interchange at University Parkway in San Bernardino, which is planned to be converted into a diverging diamond interchange. Long-range plans include adding a carpool lane in each direction on a 10.75-mile (17.30 km) section of I-215 between Nuevo Road in Perris and SR 60 near Moreno Valley. There are also plans to connect I-215 at its southern terminus in Murrieta to a planned collector–distributor lane system on I-15 near the Temecula–Murrieta border, providing access to interchanges at French Valley Parkway and Winchester Road.

== Exit list ==
County	Location	mi	km	Exit	Destinations	Notes
Riverside	Murrieta	0.00	0.00	—	I-15 south (Temecula Valley Freeway) – San Diego	Access to I-15 north is via exit 1; southern terminus; I-15 north exit 63
Riverside	Murrieta	0.50	0.80	1	Murrieta Hot Springs Road to I-15 north – Lake Elsinore	“To I-15” not signed northbound
Riverside	Murrieta	1.65	2.66	2	Los Alamos Road	
Riverside	Murrieta	3.51	5.65	4	Clinton Keith Road	
Riverside	Murrieta–Menifee line	5.50	8.85	6	Keller Road	Proposed interchange
Riverside	Murrieta–Menifee line	6.51	10.48	7	Scott Road	
Riverside	Menifee	9.51	15.30	10	Newport Road	
Riverside	Menifee	11.84	19.05	12	McCall Boulevard	
Riverside	Perris	13.76	22.14	14	Ethanac Road	
Riverside	Menifee–Perris line	14.53	23.38	15	SR 74 east – Hemet	
Riverside	Perris	17.31	27.86	17	4th Street to SR 74 west – Lake Elsinore, Perris	Former SR 74 west
Riverside	Perris	18.23	29.34	18	D Street	Southbound exit and northbound entrance
Riverside	Perris	18.88	30.38	19	Nuevo Road	
Riverside	Perris	20.50	32.99	21	Placentia Avenue	
Riverside	Perris	21.93	35.29	22	Ramona Expressway / Cajalco Expressway — Lakeview, San Jacinto	
Riverside	Perris	23.32	37.53	23	Harley Knox Boulevard	Formerly Oleander Avenue
Riverside	March Air Reserve Base	25.15	40.48	25	Van Buren Boulevard — Riverside National Cemetery, March Field Air Museum	
Riverside	March Air Reserve Base	26.76	43.07	27A	Cactus Avenue — March ARB	Signed as exits 27A (east) and 27B (west) southbound
Riverside	Riverside	27.42	44.13	27B	Alessandro Boulevard	Signed as exit 27C southbound
Riverside	Riverside–Moreno Valley line	28.44	45.77	28	Eucalyptus Avenue / Eastridge Avenue	
Riverside	Riverside	29.34	47.22	29	SR 60 east (Moreno Valley Freeway) – Beaumont, Indio	South end of SR 60 overlap; SR 60 west exit 58
Riverside	Riverside	29.91	48.14	30A	Box Springs Road / Fair Isle Drive — Box Springs	Northbound exit is via SR 60 west
Riverside	Riverside	30.48	49.05	30B	Central Avenue / Watkins Drive	
Riverside	Riverside	31.68	50.98	31	El Cerrito Drive	Closed
Riverside	Riverside	31.85	51.26	32A	Martin Luther King Boulevard	Signed as exit 31 northbound; serves UC Riverside
Riverside	Riverside	32.49	52.29	32B	University Avenue	Signed as exit 32 northbound; serves UC Riverside
Riverside	Riverside	33.16	53.37	33	Blaine Street / 3rd Street	
Riverside	Riverside	34.24	55.10	34A	Spruce Street	Closed
Riverside	Riverside	34.27	55.15	34B	SR 91 west (Riverside Freeway) – Riverside, Beach Cities	Left exit southbound; SR 91 east exit 65B; former US 91 south
Riverside	Riverside	34.27	55.15	34C	SR 60 west (Pomona Freeway) – Pomona, Los Angeles	North end of SR 60 overlap; left exit northbound; SR 60 east exit 53B
Riverside	Riverside	34.90	56.17	35	Columbia Avenue	
Riverside	Riverside	36.01	57.95	36	Center Street — Highgrove	No northbound entrance
San Bernardino	Colton	36.73	59.11	37	La Cadena Drive / Iowa Avenue — Colton	
San Bernardino	Grand Terrace	37.64	60.58	38	Barton Road	
San Bernardino	Colton	39.02	62.80	39	Mt. Vernon Avenue / Washington Street	Mount Vernon Avenue was old US 66/US 91/US 395
San Bernardino	Colton	40.38	64.99	40A	I-10 east – Redlands	Signed as exit 40 southbound; former US 70/US 99; I-10 exit 72
San Bernardino	Colton	40.38	64.99	40B	I-10 west (San Bernardino Freeway) – Los Angeles	Signed as exit 40 southbound; former US 70/US 99; I-10 exit 72
San Bernardino	San Bernardino	41.36	66.56	41	Orange Show Road / Auto Plaza Drive	
San Bernardino	San Bernardino	41.91	67.45	42A	Inland Center Drive — Inland Center Mall	
San Bernardino	San Bernardino	42.38	68.20	42B	Mill Street — San Bernardino Airport	
San Bernardino	San Bernardino	43.12	69.39	43	2nd Street / 3rd Street — San Bernardino Civic Center	
San Bernardino	San Bernardino	43.51	70.02	44A	SR 66 west (5th Street) – San Bernardino Civic Center	Signed as exit 44 southbound
San Bernardino	San Bernardino	44.42	71.49	44B	Base Line Street	Signed as exit 45 southbound
San Bernardino	San Bernardino	45.27	72.86	45	To SR 210 east (SR 259 north) – Highland	Northbound exit and southbound entrance; SR 210 west exit 75B
San Bernardino	San Bernardino	45.70	73.55	45B	Muscupiabe Drive	Closed
San Bernardino	San Bernardino	45.69– 46.05	73.53– 74.11	46A	Highland Avenue / 27th Street / Mt. Vernon Avenue	Mt. Vernon Avenue not signed northbound; signed as exit 46B southbound
San Bernardino	San Bernardino	46.38	74.64	46B	SR 210 west (Foothill Freeway) – Pasadena	Signed as exit 46A southbound; SR 210 east exit 74; future I-210 west; former SR 30 west
San Bernardino	San Bernardino	46.38	74.64	46C	SR 210 east (Foothill Freeway) – Redlands	Southbound exit and northbound entrance; northbound exit is via exit 45; future I-210 east; SR 210 west exit 74; former SR 30 east
San Bernardino	San Bernardino	47.96	77.18	48	University Parkway — Cal State San Bernardino, University District	Former SR 206 north
San Bernardino	San Bernardino	50.42	81.14	50	Palm Avenue / Kendall Drive	Former SR 206 south
San Bernardino	San Bernardino	53.65	86.34	54A	Devore Road	Signed as exit 54 southbound
San Bernardino	San Bernardino	54.08	87.03	54B	I-15 south (Ontario Freeway) – San Diego	Northern terminus; I-15 exit 123
San Bernardino	San Bernardino	54.08	87.03	—	I-15 Truck north / Kenwood Avenue	Northern terminus; I-15 exit 123
San Bernardino	San Bernardino	54.08	87.03	—	I-15 north (Mojave Freeway) – Barstow	Northern terminus; I-15 exit 123
1.000 mi = 1.609 km; 1.000 km = 0.621 mi: Closed/former; Concurrency terminus; Incomplete access
