= CA-105 =

CA-105 may refer to:

- Interstate 105 (California), part of the Interstate Highway System but simply referred to as "Route 105" in state law.
- Interstate 105 (California 1964–1968), a former Interstate highway
- California State Route 105 (1968–1993), a former rump highway
- Caproni Ca.105, an experimental aircraft
