= Overpass =

Bridge, road, railway, or similar structure that crosses over another road or railway

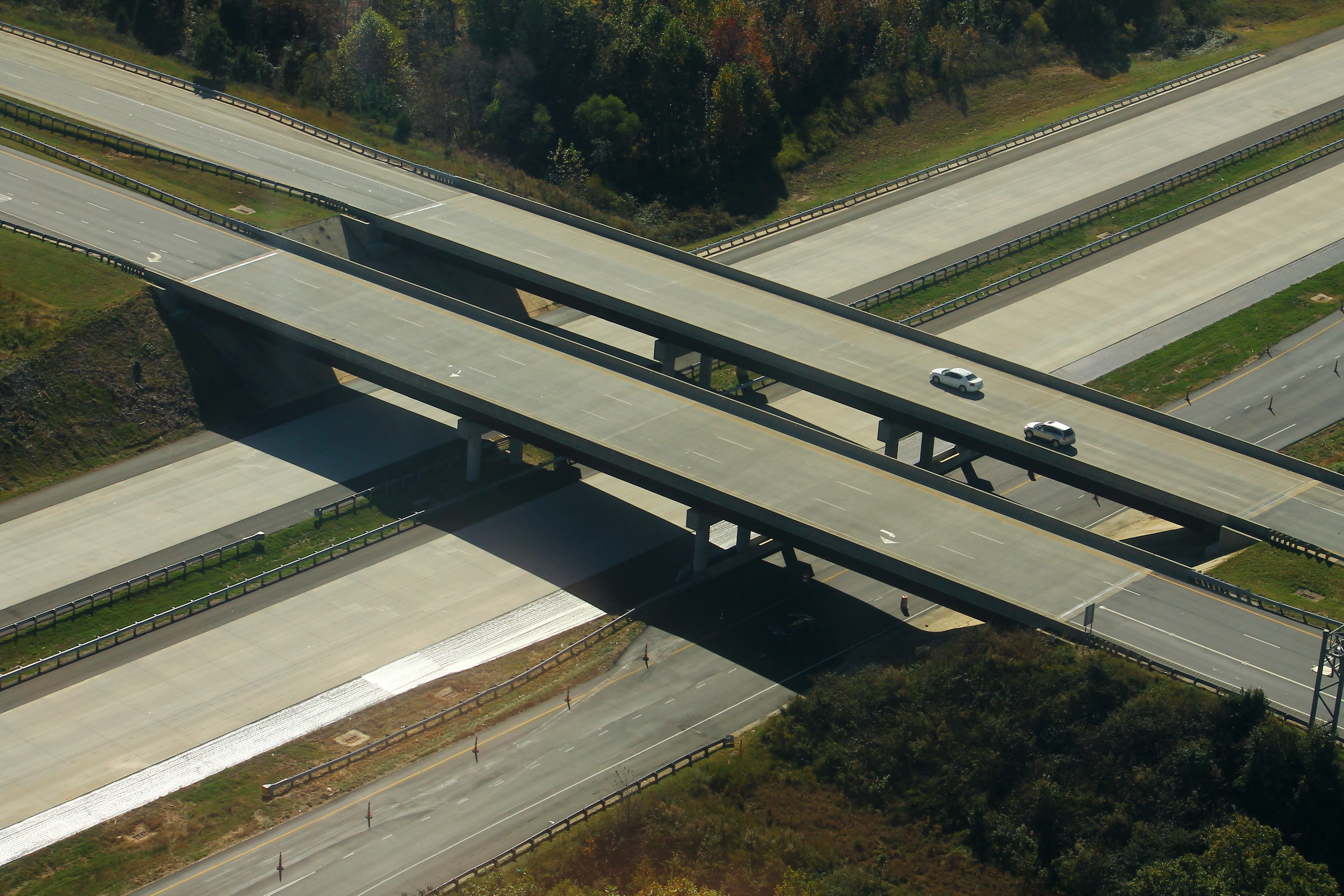
Highway overpass in Greensboro, North Carolina

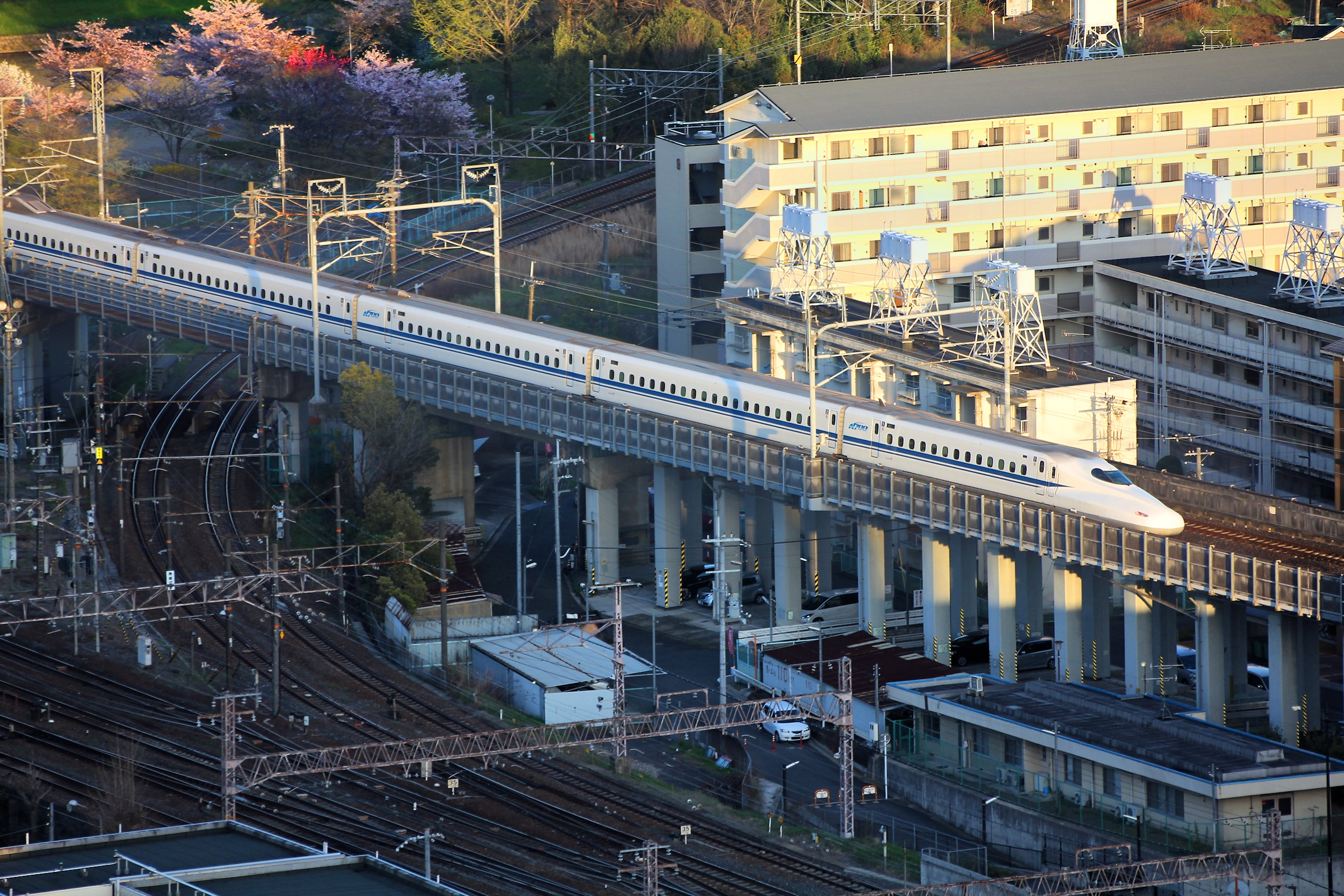
Railway overpass crossing multiple railway lines and roads in Kyoto, Japan

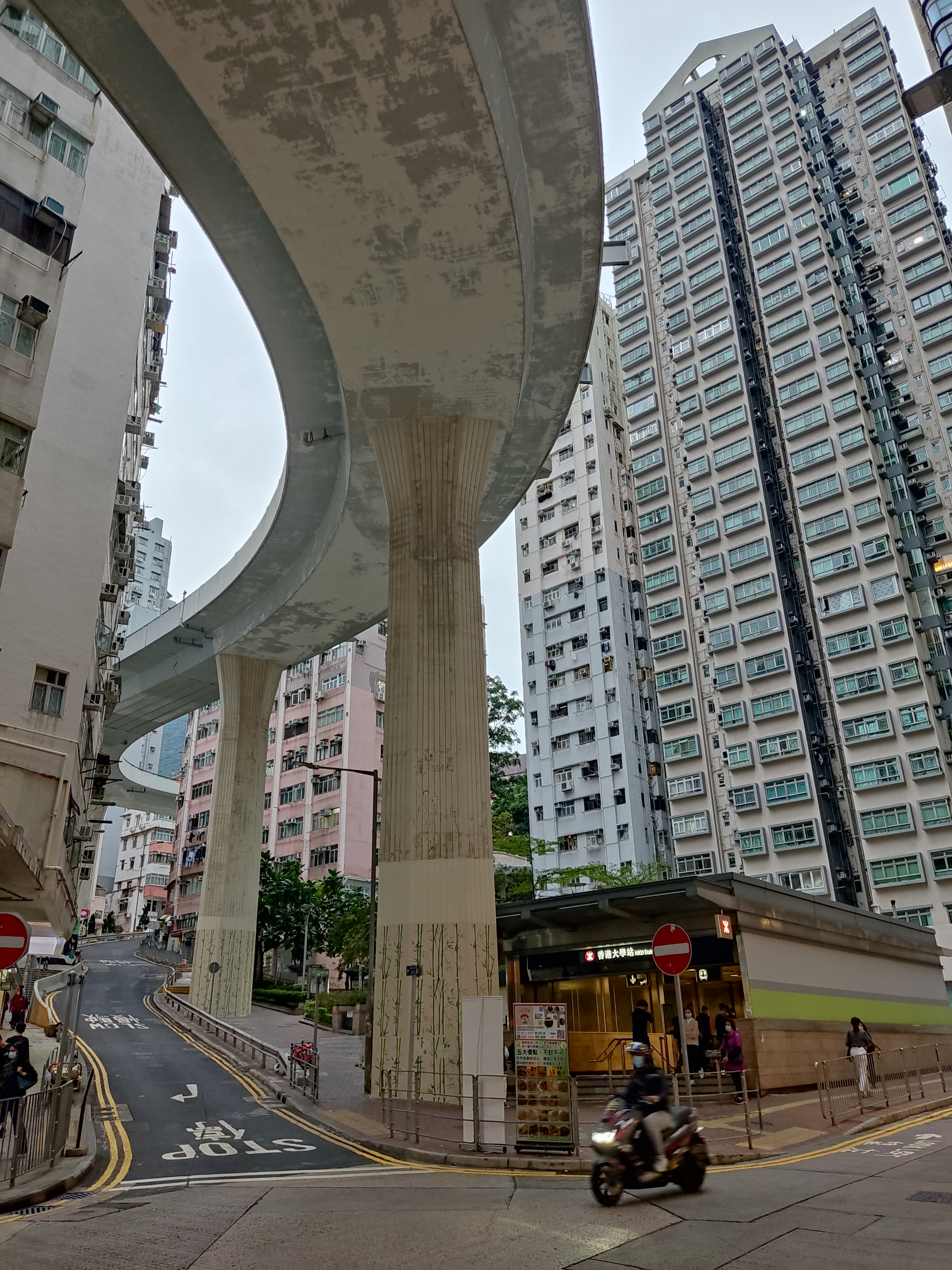
In Hong Kong, an overpass is built along a street or road, like Hill Road Flyover, to alleviate traffic between two main roads.

An overpass, called an overbridge or flyover in the United Kingdom and some other Commonwealth countries, is a bridge, road, railway or similar structure that is over another road or railway. An overpass and underpass together form a grade separation. Stack interchanges are made up of several overpasses.

== History ==
The world's first railroad flyover was constructed in 1843 by the London and Croydon Railway at Norwood Junction railway station to carry its atmospheric railway vehicles over the Brighton Main Line.

== Highway and road ==
In North American usage, a flyover is a high-level overpass, built above main overpass lanes, or a bridge built over what had been an at-grade intersection. Traffic engineers usually refer to the latter as a grade separation. A flyover may also be an extra ramp added to an existing interchange, either replacing an existing cloverleaf loop (or being built in place of one) with a higher, faster ramp that eventually bears left, but may be built as a right or left exit.

A cloverleaf or partial cloverleaf contains some 270 degree loops, which can slow traffic and can be difficult to construct with multiple lanes. Where all such turns are replaced with flyovers (perhaps with some underpasses) only 90 degree turns are needed, and there may be four or more distinct levels of traffic. Depending upon design, traffic may flow in all directions at or near open road speeds (when not congested). For more examples, see Freeway interchange.

== Pedestrian ==
A pedestrian overpass allows traffic to pass without affecting pedestrian safety.

== Railway ==
Railway overpasses are used to replace level crossings (at-grade crossings) as a safer alternative. Using overpasses allows for unobstructed rail traffic to flow without conflicting with vehicular and pedestrian traffic. Rapid transit systems use complete grade separation of their rights of way to avoid traffic interference with frequent and reliable service.

Railways also use flying junctions instead of flat junctions as a way to avoid trains conflicting with those on other tracks.

== Gallery ==
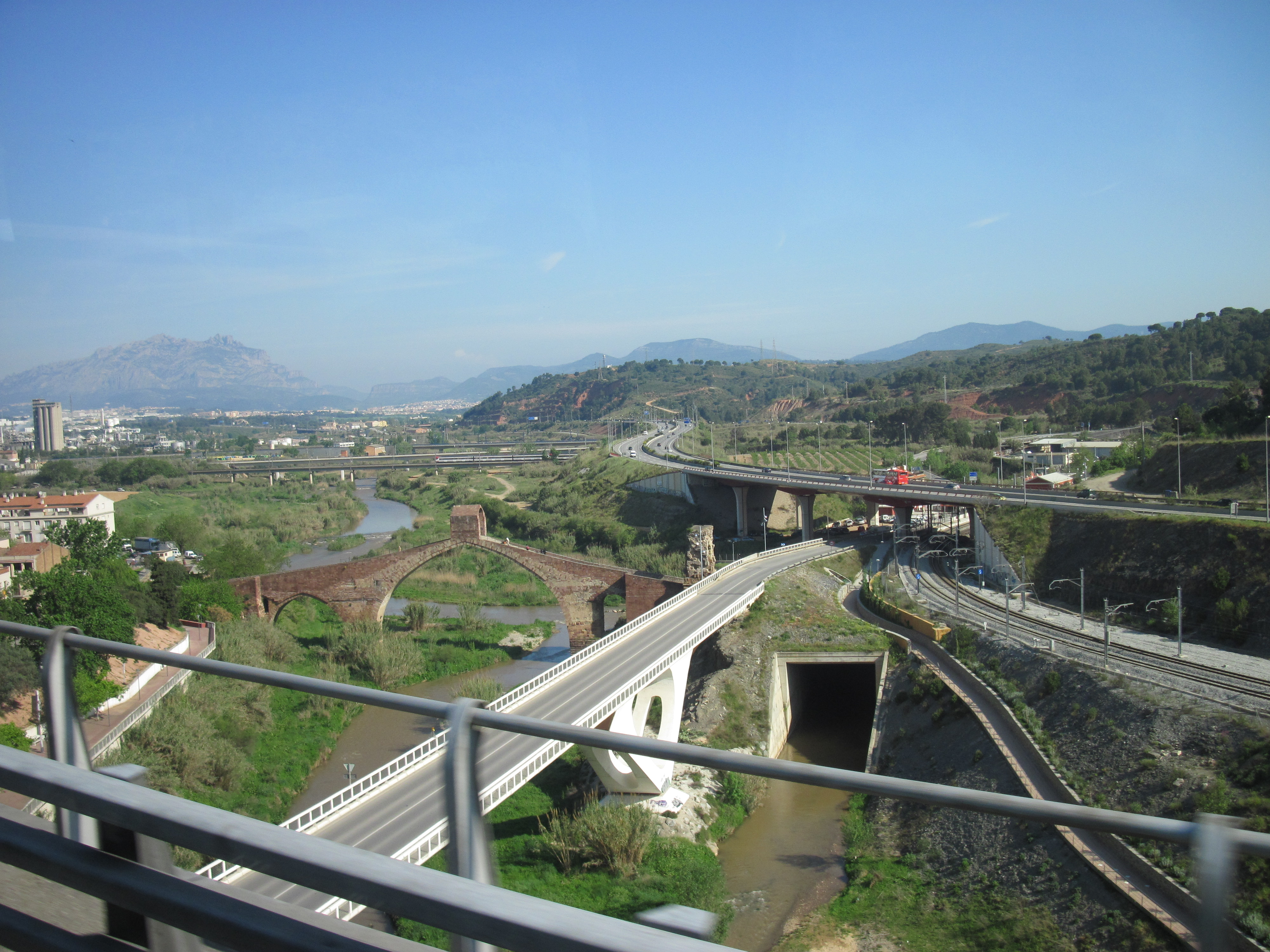
Overpasses near Barcelona

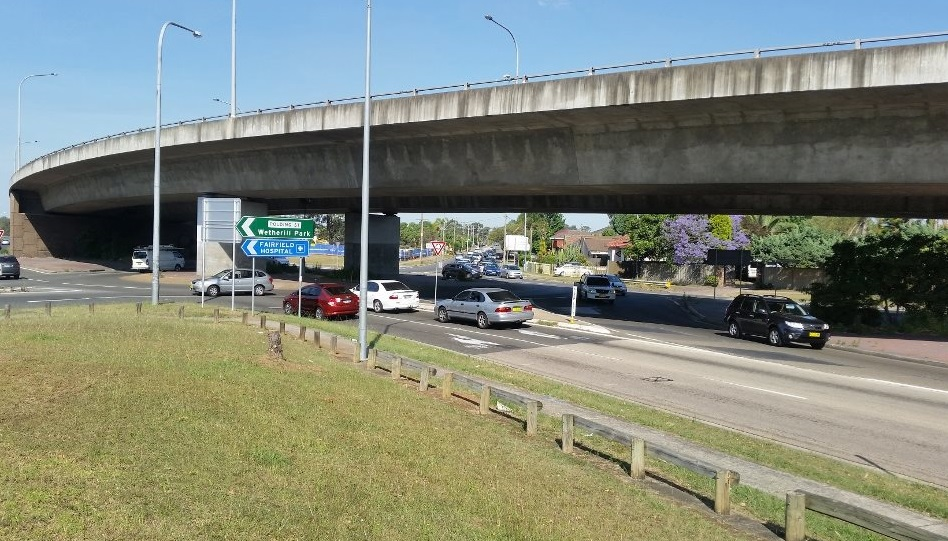
Cumberland Highway overpasses a street in Sydney

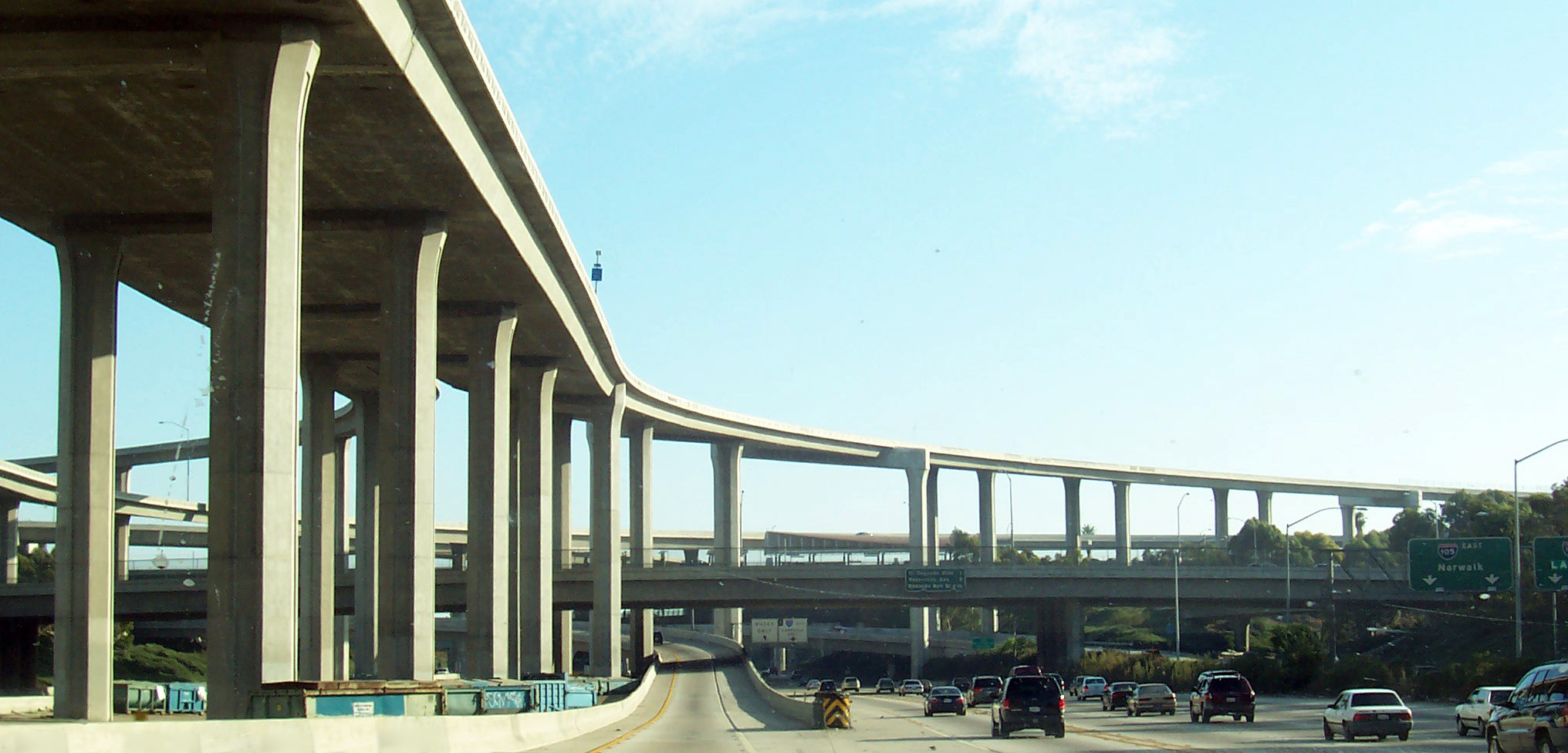
A high-capacity stack interchange: the Judge Harry Pregerson Interchange in Los Angeles

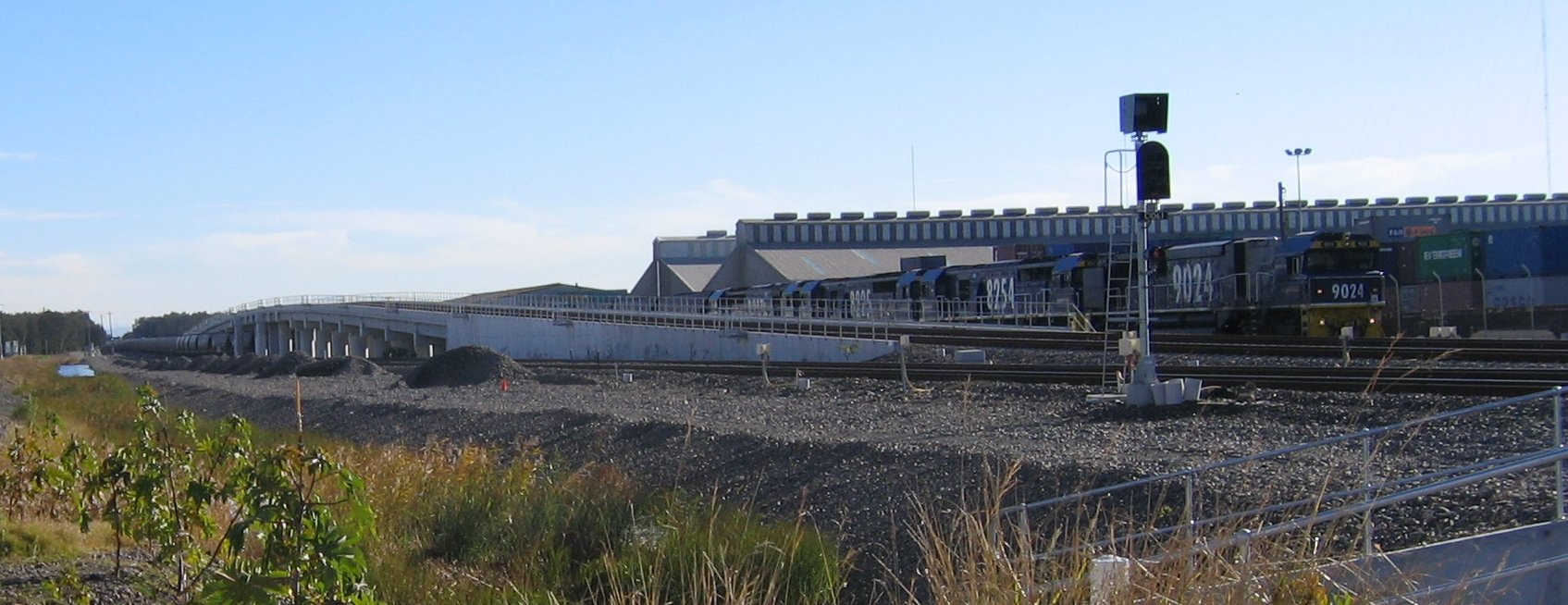
Sandgate Flyover, New South Wales, where two main railway lines pass over two dedicated coal lines

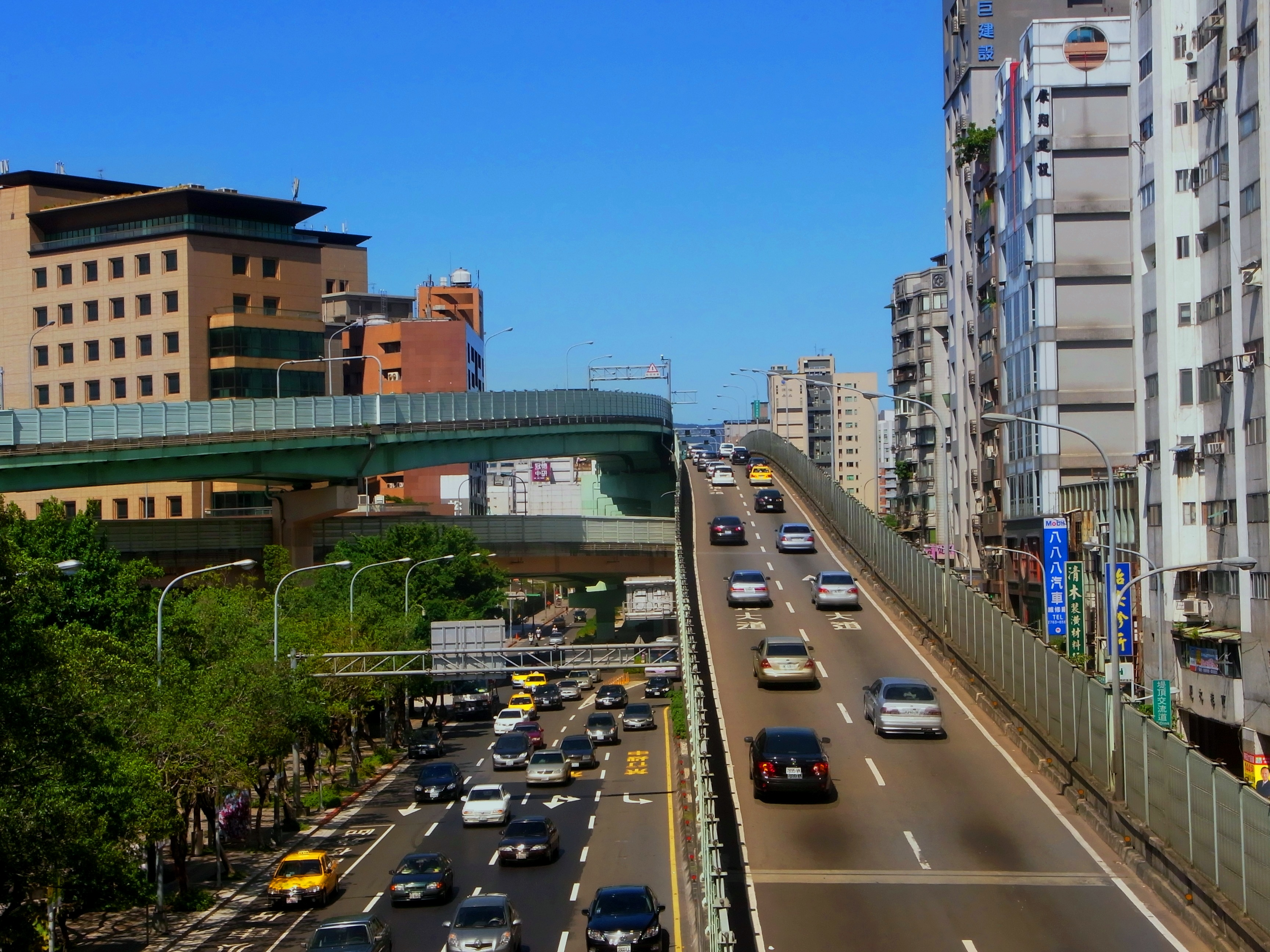
Zheng Qi overpass, Taipei

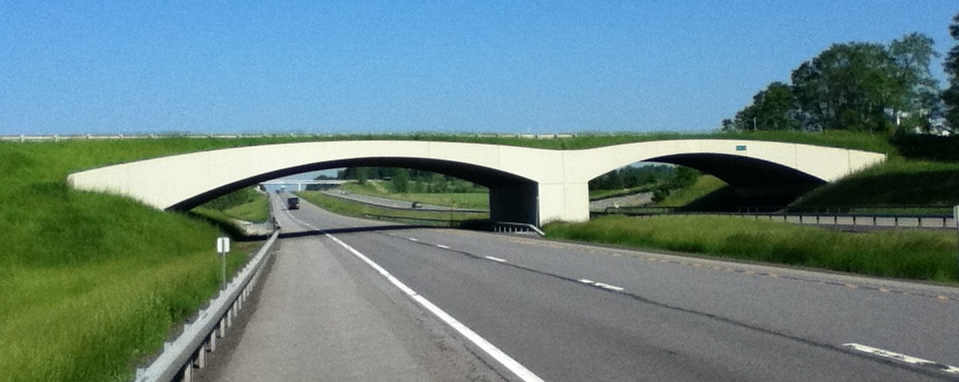
New York State Thruway overpass

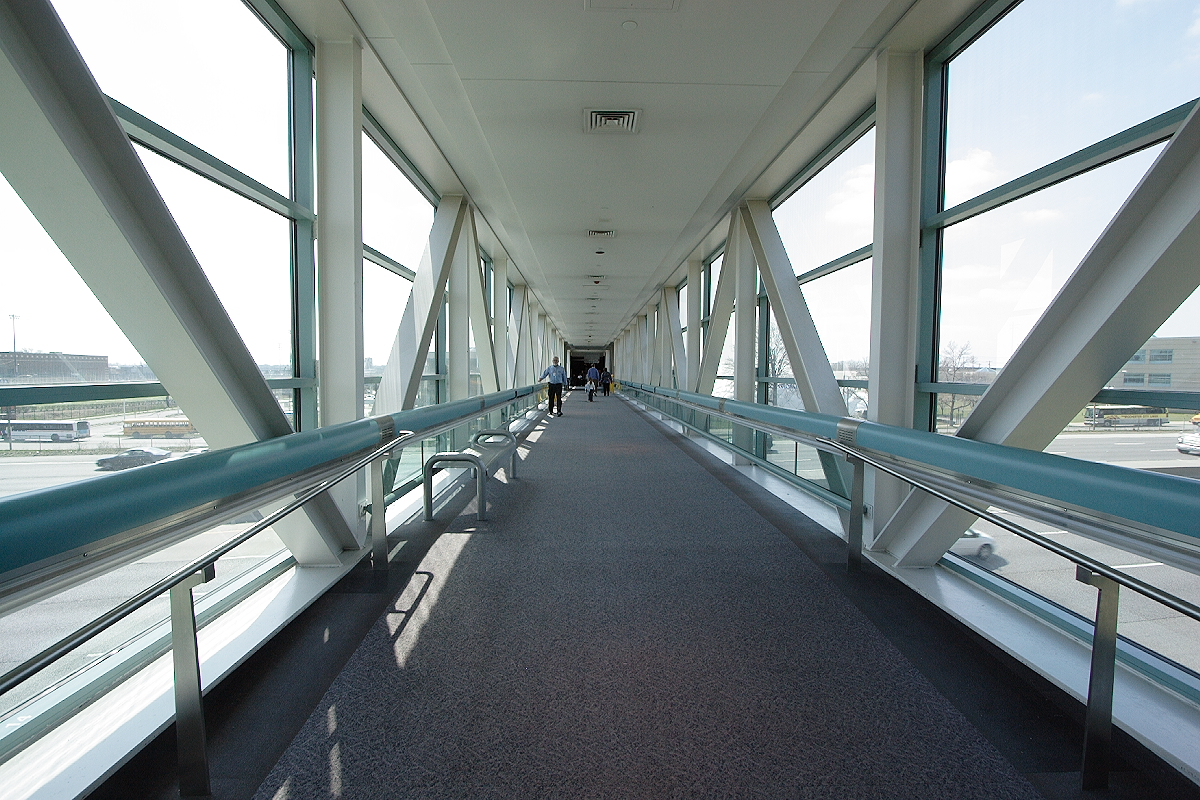
Pedestrian overpass, I-64, St. Louis, Missouri. This overpass is located at the St. Louis Science Center.

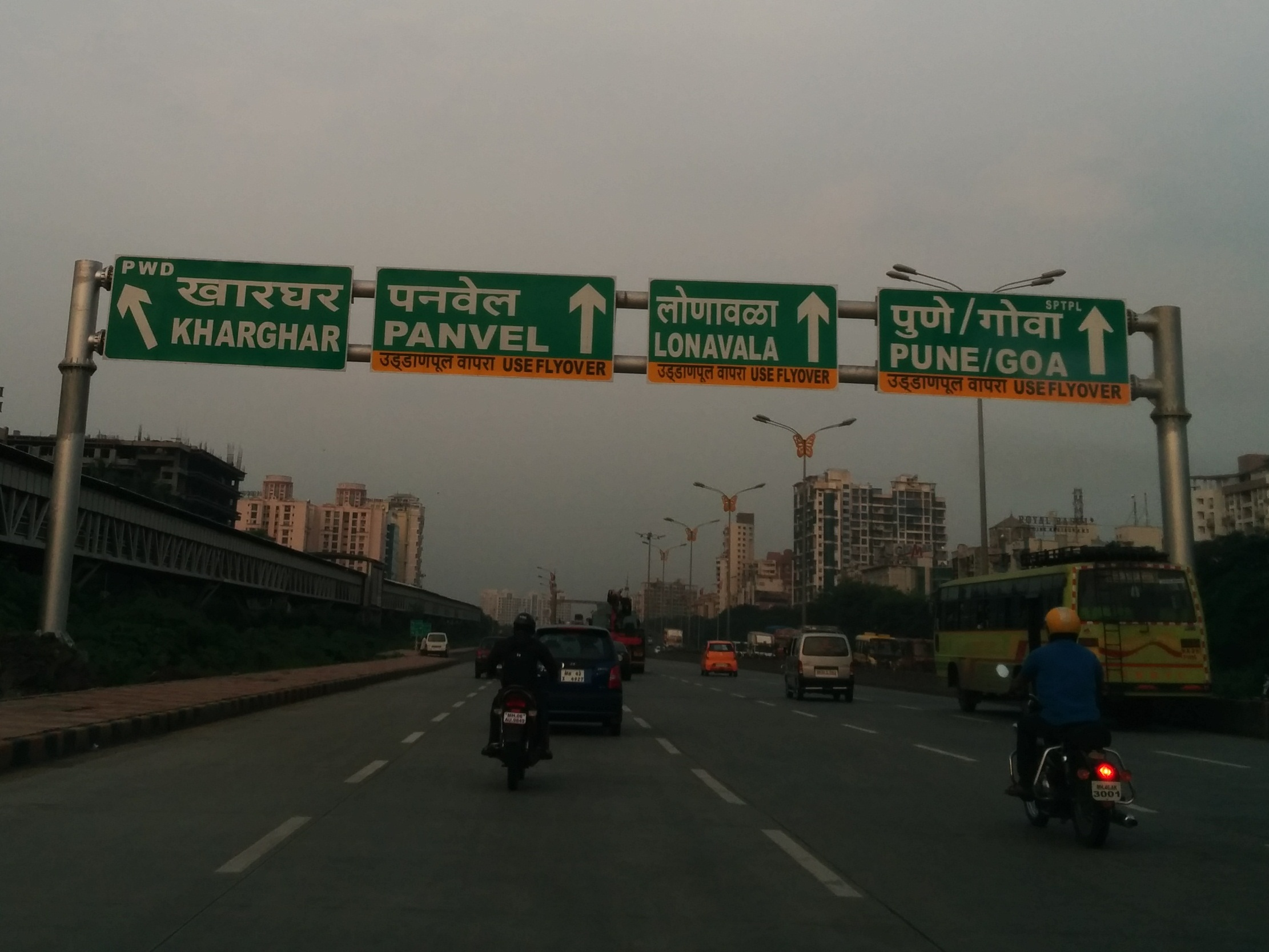
A road sign on Sion Panvel Highway in India instructing travellers to use flyover for onward journey.

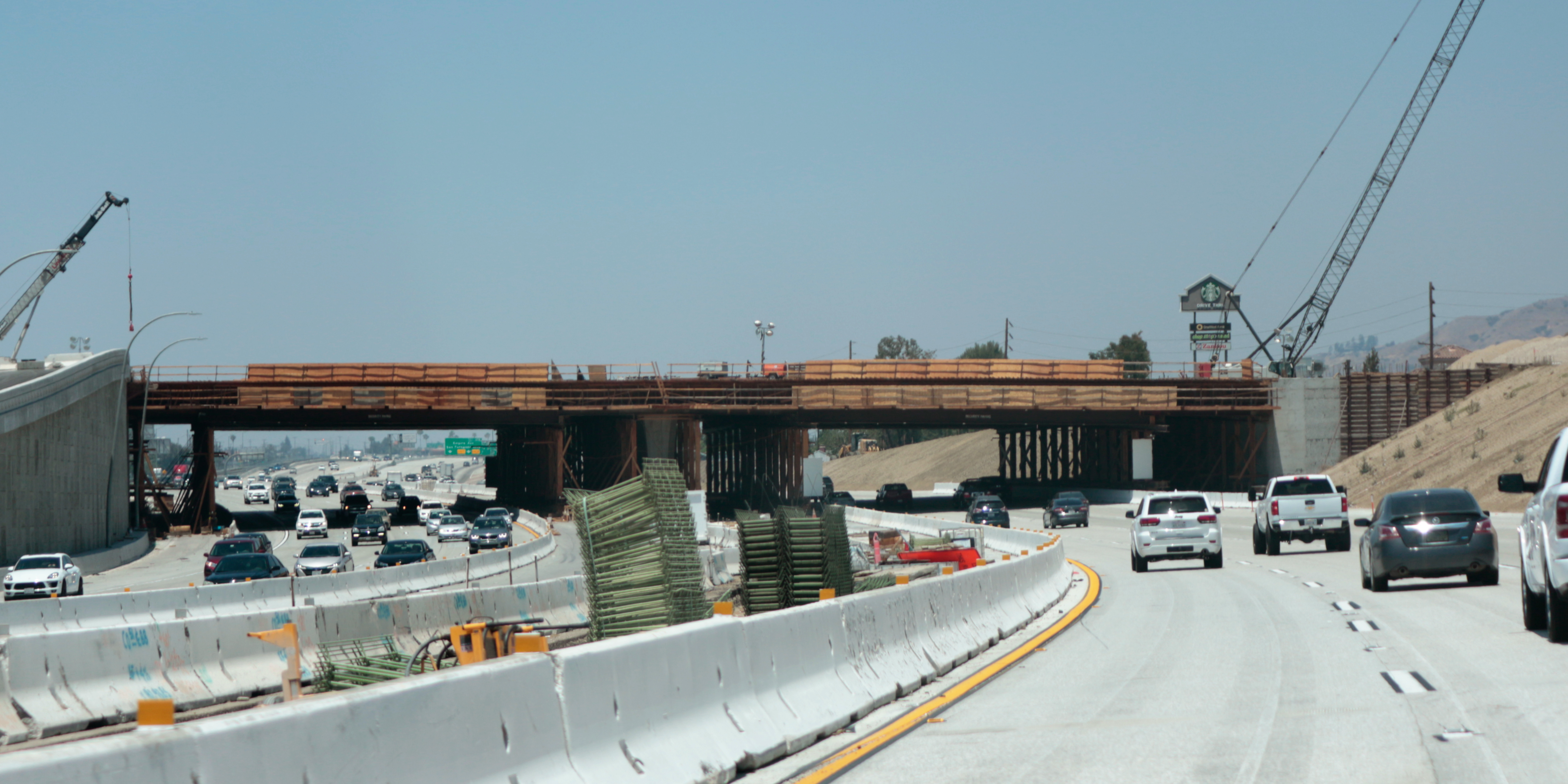
Overpass under construction over Interstate 5 in Burbank, California, July 2021

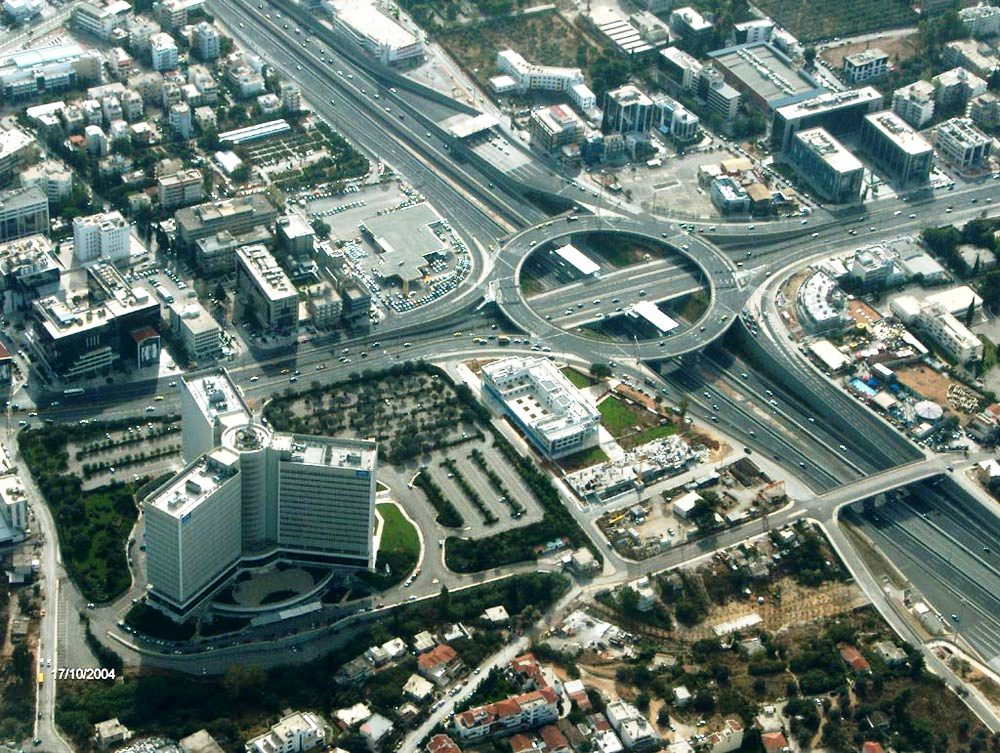
Round overpass in Athens

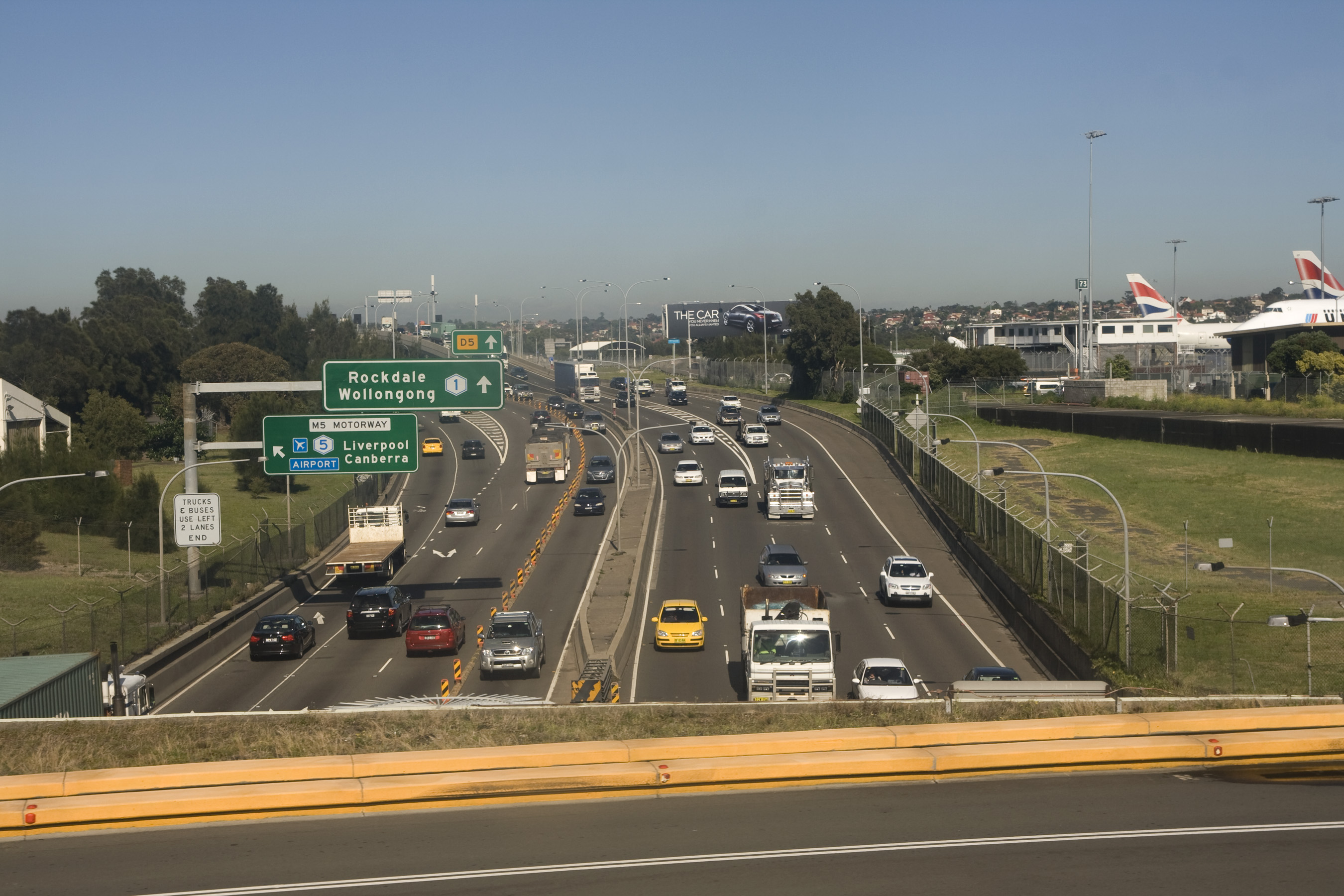
Sydney airport taxiway going over a major road.

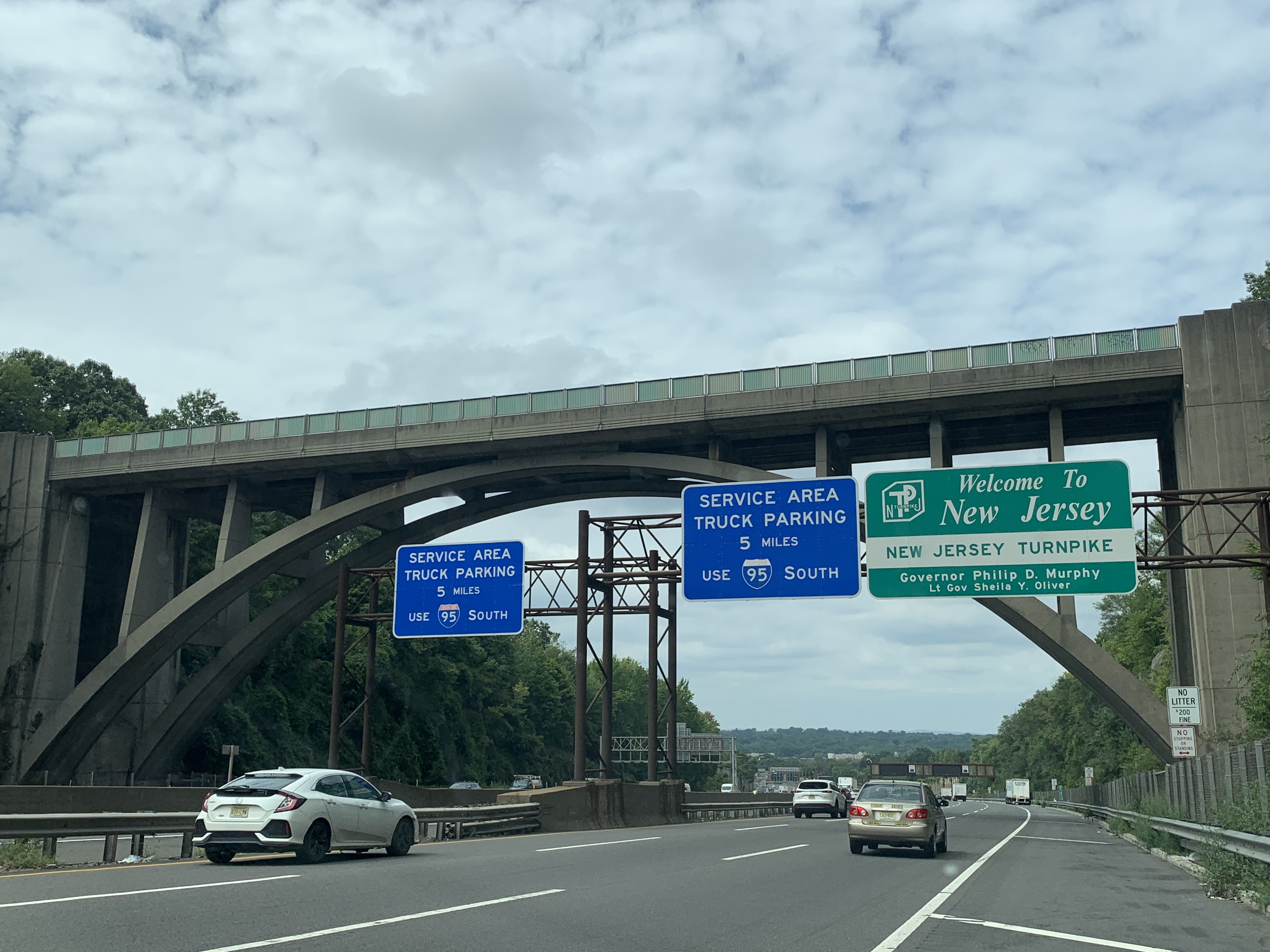
Sign welcoming drivers to the New Jersey Turnpike under the Edgewood Road Bridge in Leonia, New Jersey

== See also ==
- Footbridge
- Skyway
- Stack interchange
- Viaduct
- Wildlife crossing
