= Interstate 110 and California State Route 110 =

Interstate and state highway in California

Interstate 110 and State Route 110
- I-110 highlighted in red; SR 110 in purple

Route information
- Auxiliary route of I-10
- Maintained by Caltrans
- Length: 31.819 mi (51.208 km)
- Component highways: I-110 from San Pedro, Los Angeles to Downtown Los Angeles; SR 110 from Downtown Los Angeles to Pasadena
- Tourist routes: Arroyo Seco Parkway
- Restrictions: No trucks over 3 tons north of US 101

Major junctions
- South end: SR 47 in San Pedro, Los Angeles
- I-405 in Carson; SR 91 in Harbor Gateway, Los Angeles; I-105 in South Los Angeles; I-10 in Downtown Los Angeles; US 101 in Downtown Los Angeles; I-5 in Lincoln Heights, Los Angeles
- North end: Glenarm Street in Pasadena

Location
- Country: United States
- State: California
- County: Los Angeles

Highway system
- Interstate Highway System; Main; Auxiliary; Suffixed; Business; Future; State highways in California; Interstate; US; State; Scenic; History; Pre‑1964; Unconstructed; Deleted; Freeways
← SR 109	→ SR 111

Route 110, consisting of State Route 110 (SR 110) and Interstate 110 (I-110), is a state and auxiliary Interstate Highway in the Los Angeles metropolitan area of the US state of California. The entire route connects San Pedro and the Port of Los Angeles with Downtown Los Angeles and Pasadena. The southern segment from San Pedro to I-10 in downtown Los Angeles is signed as I-110, while the northern segment to Pasadena is signed as SR 110. The entire length of I-110, as well as SR 110 south of the Four Level Interchange with US Route 101 (US 101), is the Harbor Freeway, and SR 110 north from US 101 to Pasadena is the historic Arroyo Seco Parkway, the first freeway in the western United States.

== Route description ==
Route 110 is defined in section 410, subdivision (a), of the California Streets and Highways Code, and that the highway is "from Route 47 in San Pedro to Glenarm Street in Pasadena". Following its renumbering from Route 11, Route 110 was originally defined as "from San Pedro to Colorado Boulevard in Pasadena." Control of the conventional highway portions of the route were relinquished to the cities of Pasadena and Los Angeles in 2000 and 2009 respectively. However, section 410, subdivision (b) further mandates that those cities with those relinquished former portions must still "maintain within their respective jurisdictions signs directing motorists to the continuation of Route 110".

Only the southern 20.34-mile (32.73 km) segment of Route 110 is considered an Interstate Highway according to the Federal Highway Administration (FHWA)'s route logs.

Route 110 is part of the California Freeway and Expressway System, and is part of the National Highway System, a network of highways that are considered essential to the country's economy, defense, and mobility by the Federal Highway Administration.

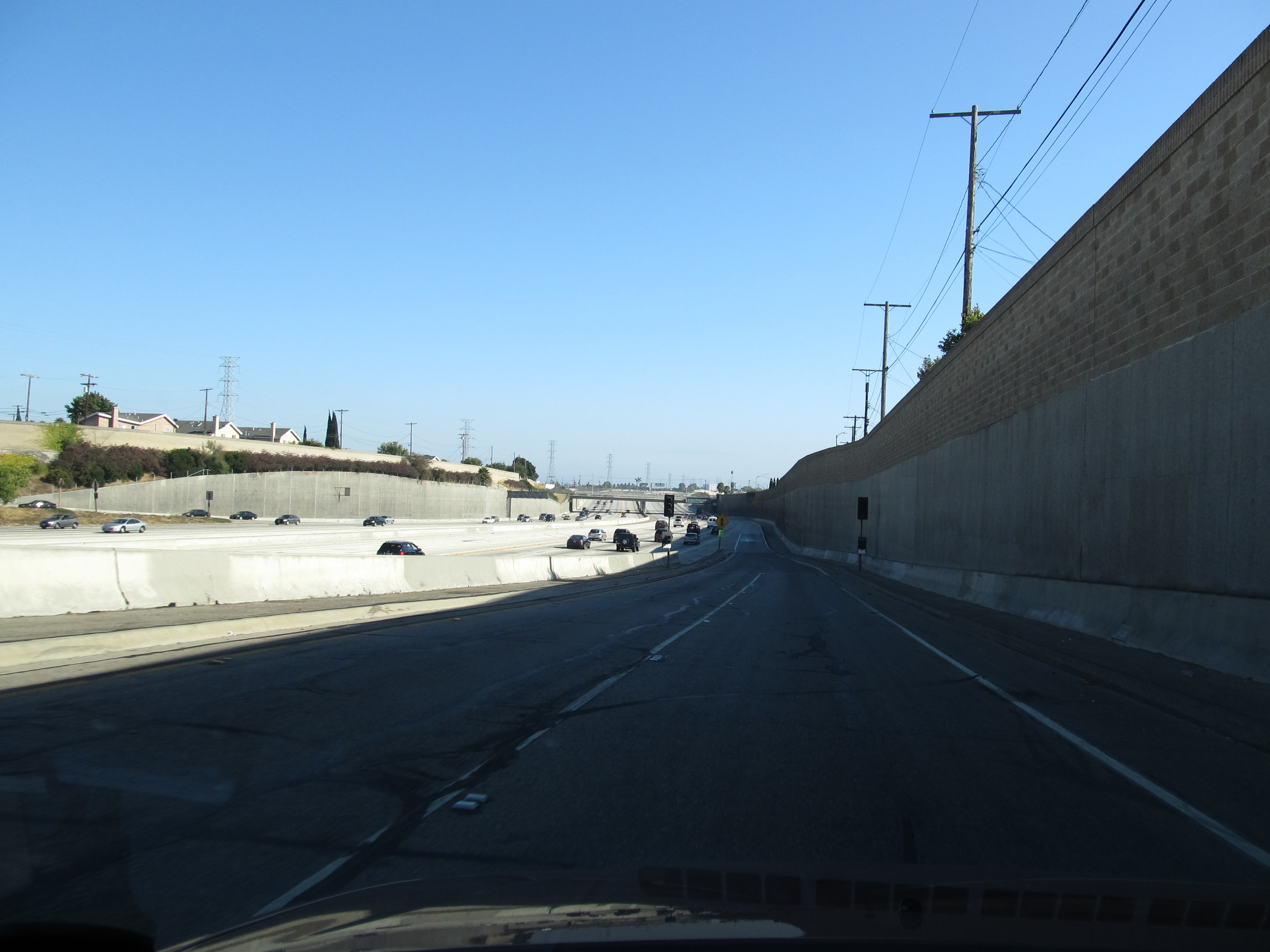
Entering Interstate 110 in Harbor Gateway, Los Angeles

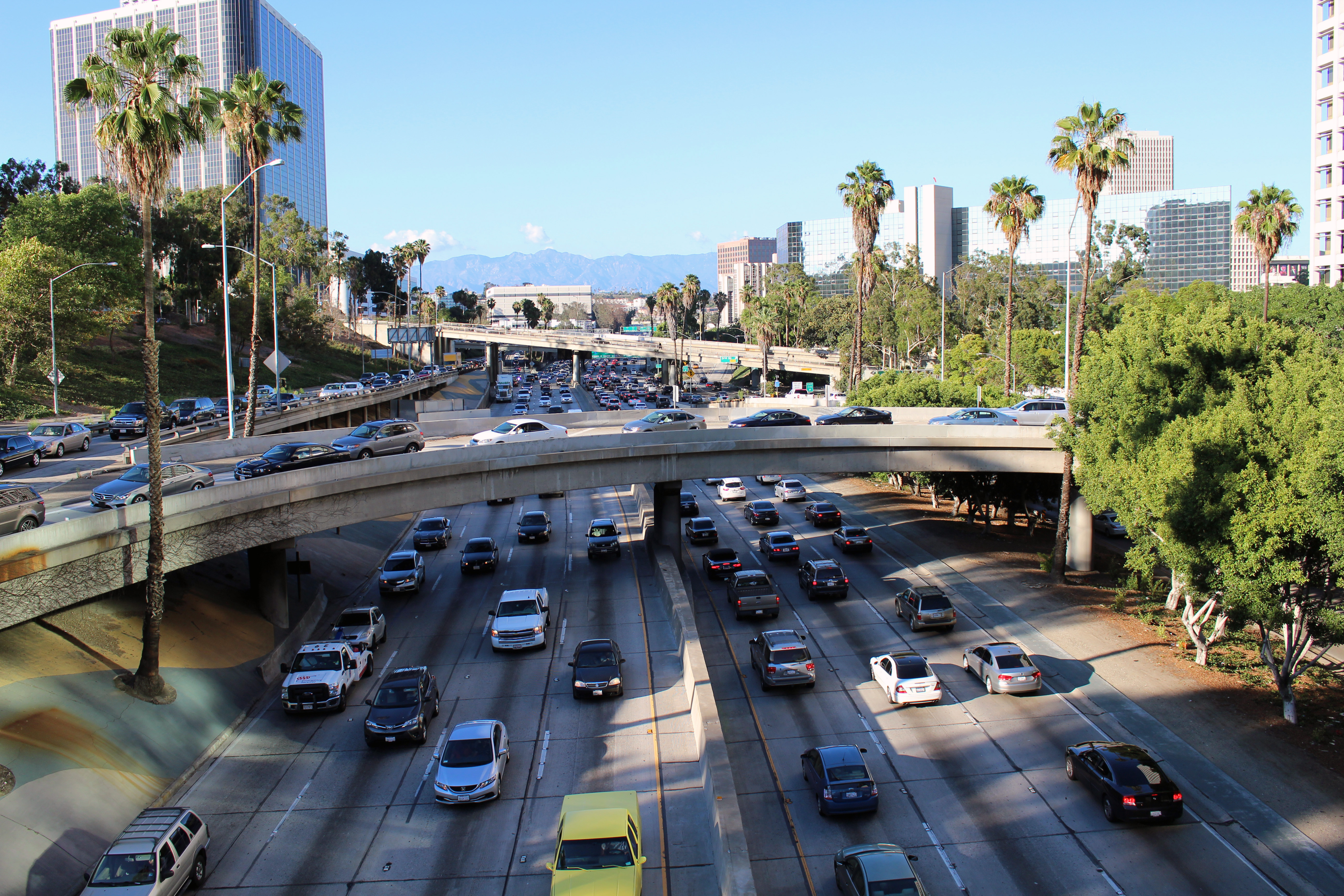
The Harbor Freeway is often heavily congested at rush hour.

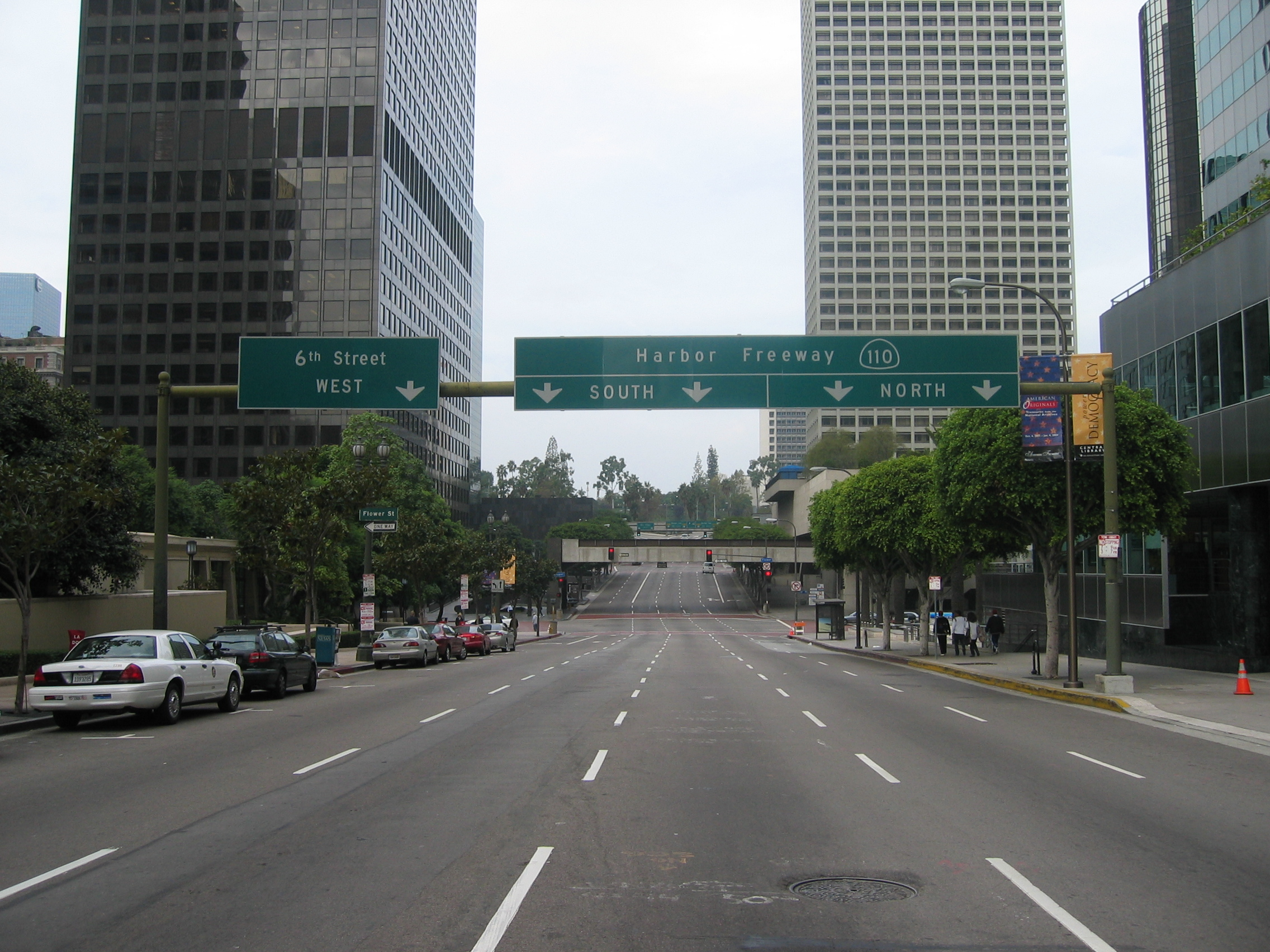
Entrance to the Harbor Freeway in Downtown Los Angeles

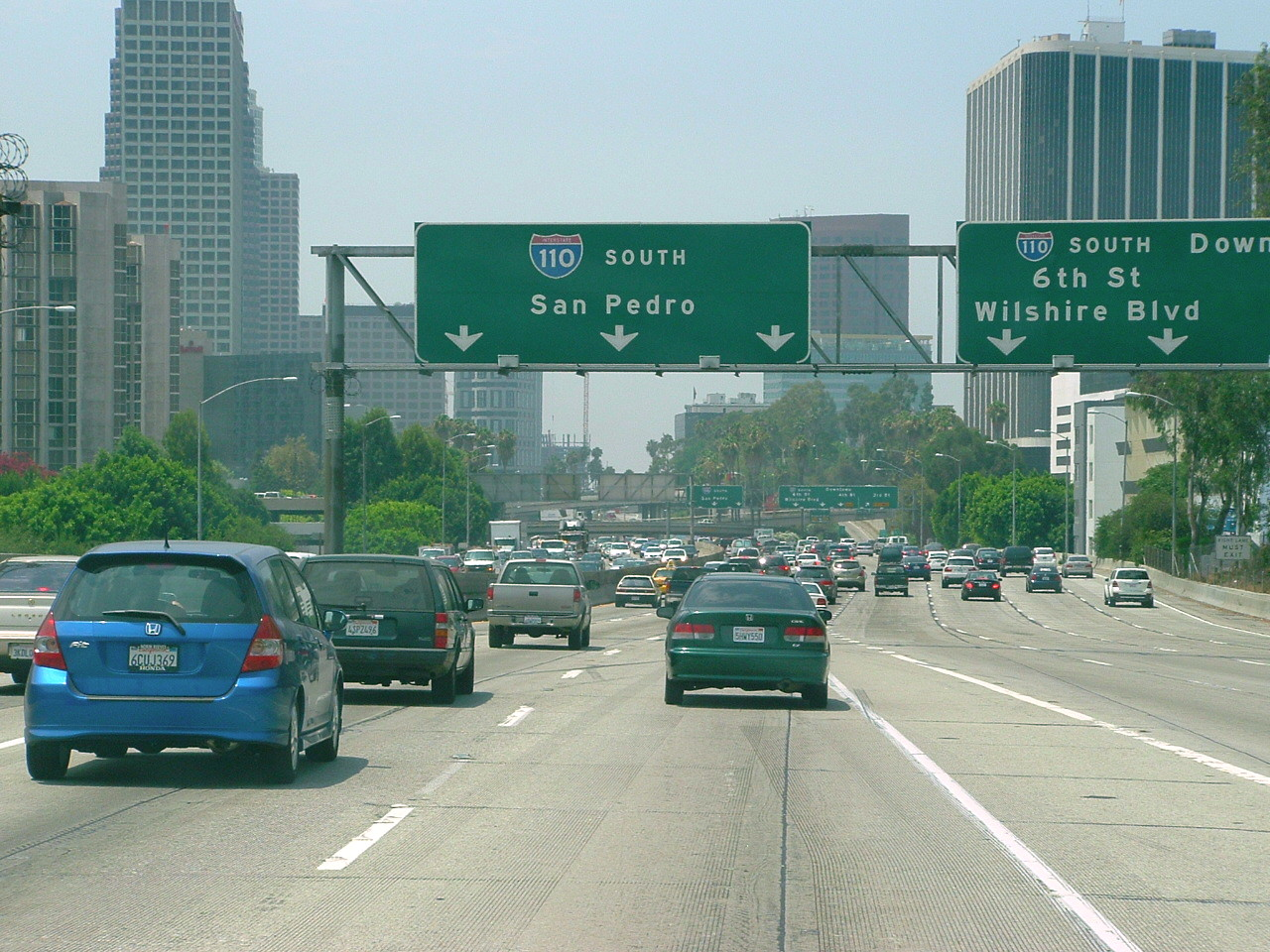
The Harbor Freeway southbound entering "The Slot" after emerging from the "4-level"

=== Harbor Freeway ===
The Harbor Freeway, signed as I-110, begins at Gaffey Street in San Pedro, where it then travels mostly due north to the Santa Monica Freeway (I-10) at a point south of downtown Los Angeles, where it becomes signed as SR 110. I-110 is primarily within the city limits of Los Angeles, running right along the South Los Angeles region and the Harbor Gateway, a two-mile (3.2 km) wide north–south corridor that was annexed by the city of Los Angeles specifically to connect San Pedro, Wilmington, and the Port of Los Angeles with the rest the city.

North of I-10, the freeway continues as SR 110 through Downtown Los Angeles to its junction with US 101 at the Four Level Interchange.

The Harbor Freeway, along with the Long Beach Freeway (I-710), are the principal means for freight from the Port of Los Angeles to railyards and warehouses further inland. Its interchange with the Santa Monica Freeway is notoriously busy and congested, and the portions bordering Bunker Hill in northwest Downtown Los Angeles are choked with traffic at peak travel times.

Landmarks

Notable landmarks and attractions near the Harbor Freeway include the Los Angeles Harbor College, California State University, Dominguez Hills, Watts Towers, Exposition Park (including the Los Angeles Memorial Coliseum, the BMO Stadium and the Lucas Museum of Narrative Art), the University of Southern California, Crypto.com Arena, L.A. Live, Los Angeles Convention Center, the skyline of Downtown Los Angeles; and Chinatown.

The Harbor Freeway is noted for its elaborate high-occupancy toll lane feature, with the HOT lanes elevated above the rest of traffic in many areas, constructed in 1994 by C.C. Myers, Inc. as HOV lanes and converted to HOT lanes in 2012. Of particular note is the Judge Harry Pregerson Interchange, which contains the most elaborate network of direct HOV/HOT connectors in Los Angeles County. It includes a seven-story ramp that connects the Century Freeway's HOV lanes to the Harbor Freeway's northbound HOT lanes and offers splendid views of the entire Los Angeles Basin and the San Gabriel Mountains. The interchange with SR 91 (formally known as the Edmond J. Russ Interchange) is also fairly large.

=== Arroyo Seco Parkway ===
SR 110 continues north as the Arroyo Seco Parkway from US 101 to Pasadena. From downtown, it passes through Elysian Park, where the northbound lanes pass through the four Figueroa Street Tunnels and the higher southbound lanes pass through a cut and over low areas on bridges. Then after crossing the Los Angeles River and the Golden State Freeway (I-5), the parkway runs alongside the Arroyo Seco seasonal river towards Pasadena.

== Harbor Transitway ==
The Harbor Transitway is a grade-separated, shared-use express bus and high-occupancy toll (HOT) corridor, running in the median of I-110, between SR 91 (Gardena Freeway) and Adams Boulevard in the south side of Downtown Los Angeles. The southern end of the HOT lanes also includes dedicated ramps connecting to the Harbor Gateway Transit Center.

As of January 2026, the high-occupancy toll (HOT) lanes are a 24/7 service. Solo drivers are tolled using a congestion pricing system based on the real-time levels of traffic. Carpools with two or more people and motorcycles are not charged. All tolls are collected using an open road tolling system, and therefore there are no toll booths to receive cash. Each vehicle using the HOT lanes is required to carry a FasTrak Flex transponder with its switch set to indicate the number of the vehicle's occupants (1, 2, or 3+). Solo drivers may also use the FasTrak standard tag without the switch. Drivers without any FasTrak tag will be assessed a toll violation regardless of whether they qualified for free.

== History ==
State Route 11
- Location: San Pedro - Pasadena
- Existed: 1934–1981

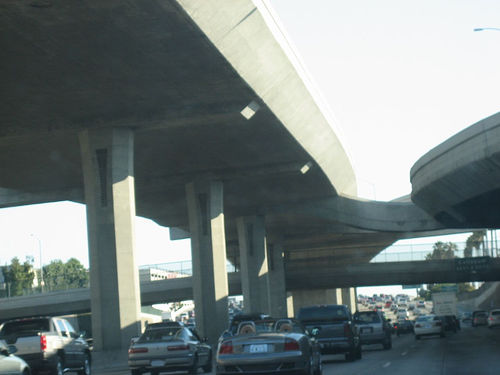
Carpool lanes on the upper deck of the Harbor Freeway, south of Adams Boulevard

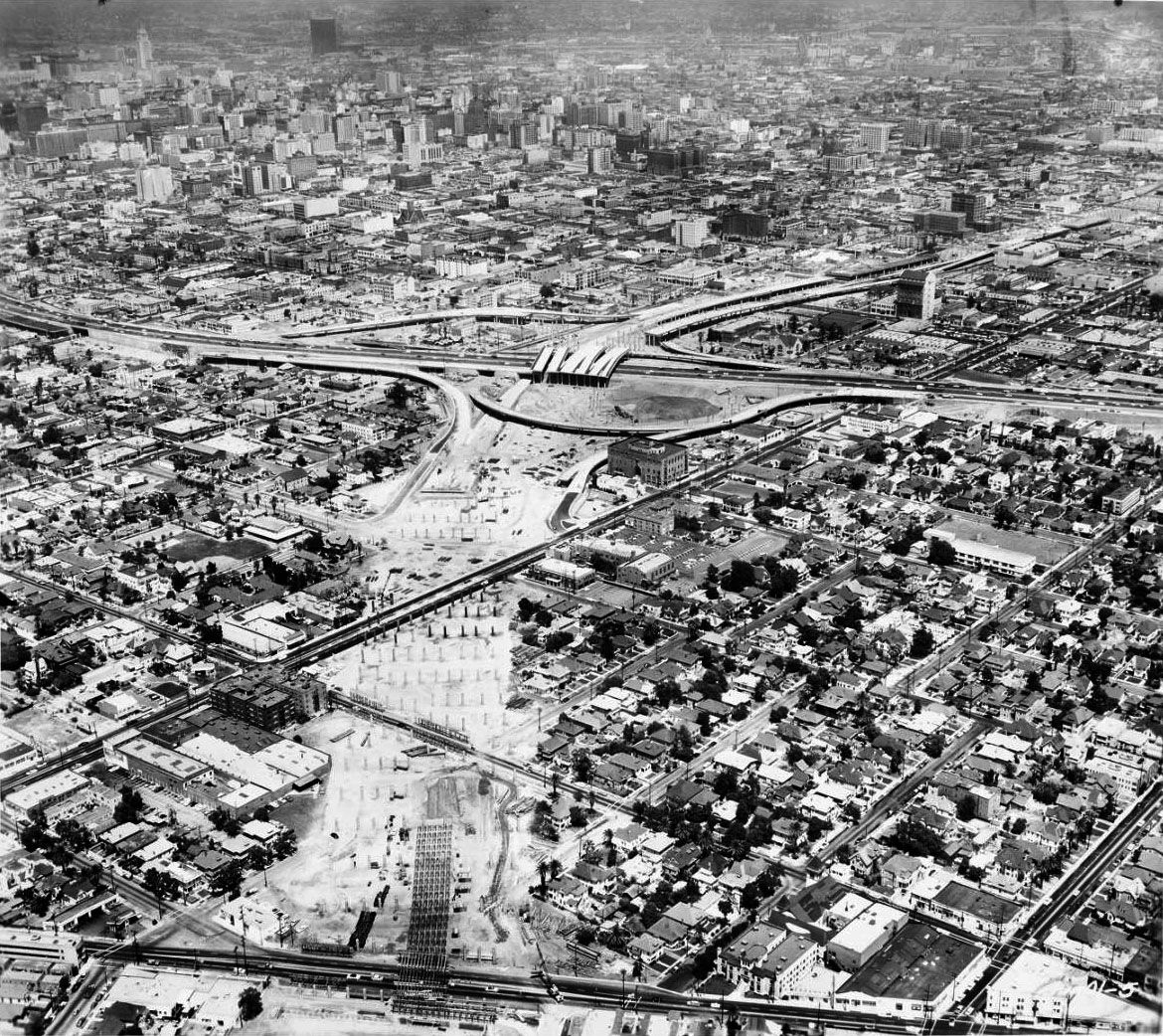
I-10 under construction (Near SR 11), c. 1960

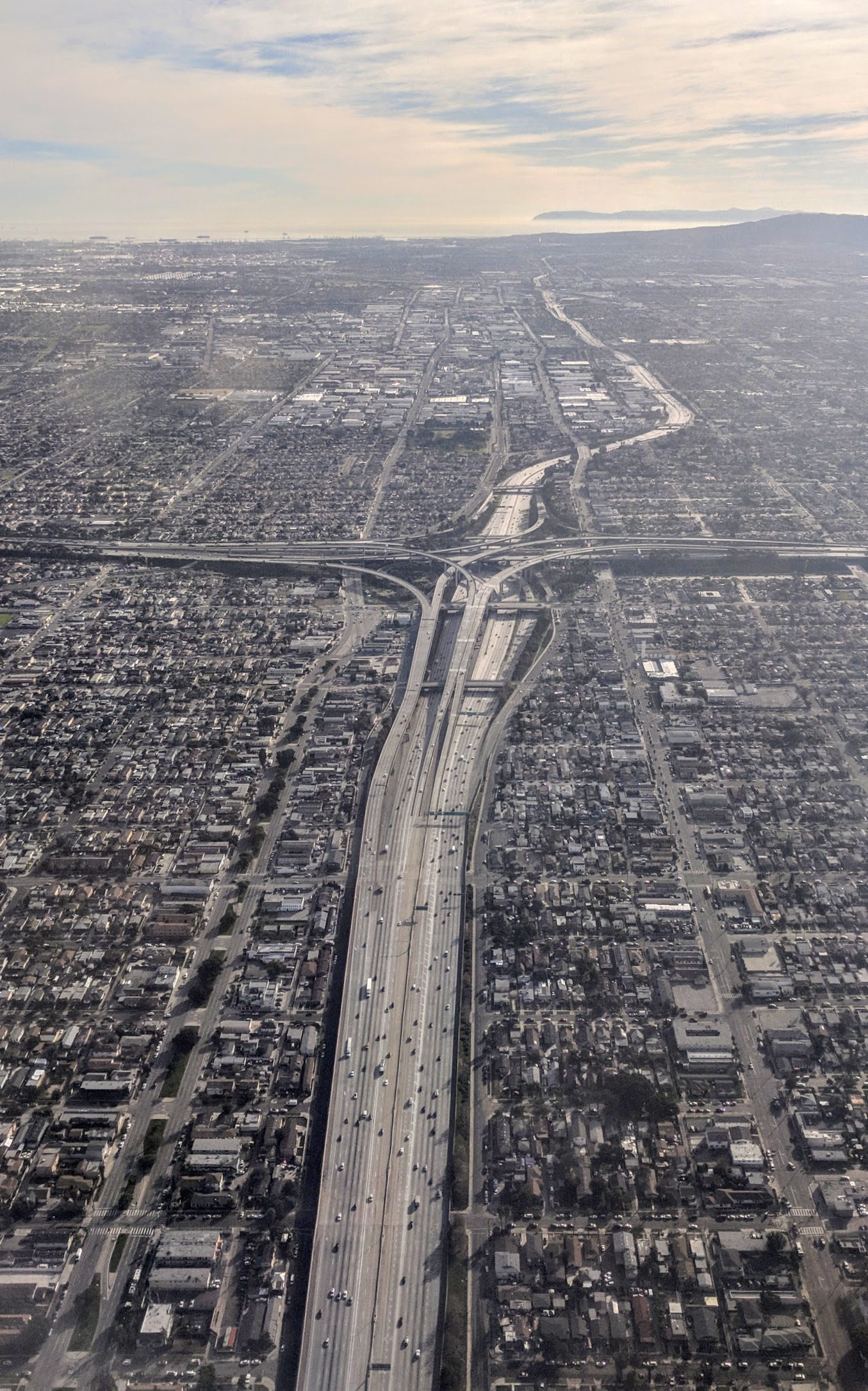
Aerial view from the north of the Harbor Freeway (I-110) and its Judge Harry Pregerson Interchange with the Century Freeway (I-105), on approach to Los Angeles International Airport. The Palos Verdes Peninsula and Santa Catalina Island are visible in the distance.

In the 1924 Major Street Traffic Plan for Los Angeles, a widening of Figueroa Street to San Pedro as a good road to the Port of Los Angeles was proposed. Progress was slow, and, in 1933, the state legislature added the entire length to the state highway system as Route 165, an unsigned designation. This route not only extended from San Pedro north to Los Angeles, but continued through the city-built Figueroa Street Tunnels and along the northern extension of Figueroa Street to Eagle Rock, and then followed Linda Vista Avenue (via an overlap on Route 161 (SR 134) over the Colorado Street Bridge) to Route 9 (now I-210) at the Devil's Gate Reservoir. The entire length of Route 165 became Sign Route 11 in 1934. US Route 6 was also assigned to the portion between SR 1 and Avenue 26 in 1937, and, at about the same time, US 66 was moved from Eagle Rock Boulevard to Figueroa Street, overlapping SR 11 between Sunset Boulevard (US 101) and Colorado Street (SR 134).

The state completed the Arroyo Seco Parkway which had been added to the state highway system in 1935 as Route 205, in early 1941, providing a faster route between SR 11 at Avenue 26 and Pasadena. US 66 was moved to the new route, while SR 11 remained on Figueroa Street and Linda Vista Avenue, the former also becoming a new US Route 66 Alternate. Construction of a freeway to San Pedro was much slower, despite having been in the earliest plans for an integrated system. Initially, the Harbor Parkway was to split at the merge with the Venice Parkway northeast of the University of Southern California, with the East By-Pass and West By-Pass straddling the Los Angeles Central Business District and rejoining at the split between the Arroyo Seco Parkway and Riverside Parkway south of Dodger Stadium. The West By-Pass was soon incorporated into the Harbor Parkway, and the first short piece, by then renamed the Harbor Freeway, opened on July 30, 1952, from the Four Level Interchange south to 3rd Street. (The Arroyo Seco Parkway was completed to the Four Level Interchange on September 22, 1953, and renamed the Pasadena Freeway on November 16, 1954.)

The Harbor Freeway gradually pushed south, opening to Olympic Boulevard on March 23, 1954, and Washington Boulevard on May 14, 1954. On March 27, 1956, the highway was extended to 42nd Street, and on April 24, 1957, it reached temporary ramps at 88th Place. Further extensions were made to Century Boulevard on July 31, 1958, 124th Street on September 24, 1958, Alondra Boulevard (which the county widened to carry the load) on May 2, 1960, 190th Street on July 15, 1960, Torrance Boulevard on August 28, 1962, and finally Pacific Coast Highway (SR 1) on September 26, 1962. There it connected with a section that had been open since June 19, 1956, from Pacific Coast Highway south to Channel Street. Along with the Vincent Thomas Bridge to Terminal Island, the final piece in San Pedro opened on July 9, 1970, completing the Harbor Freeway to its present length.

In December 1978, the Harbor Freeway was approved as an Interstate Highway by the FHWA. In 1981, the SR 11 designation was renumbered as I-110 on the Harbor Freeway, and SR 110 on the Pasadena Freeway. The I-110 designation had been previously applied to what is now a spur of I-10 from 1958 to 1968.

=== Richard Ankrom signage ===
In 2001, Richard Ankrom, a local artist who got lost trying to get onto I-5 North from northbound SR 110 because there was no clear official signage labeling access to I-5 North, solved his frustration by covertly modifying one of the overhead signs on the freeway just before the Four Level Interchange (34.055759°N 118.256181°W). Using official government sign specifications, Ankrom fabricated two sign pieces, one being an I-5 marker shield and the other with the word "NORTH", and affixed them to the left side of the sign. He performed his modifications in broad daylight, disguised as a Caltrans worker. In that district, Caltrans has three sign crews, each thinking one of the other two crews did the installation. After nine months, at Ankrom's request, the Los Angeles Downtown News broke the story.

Prior to Ankrom's work, the only signage directing motorists to the I-5 North off-ramp came at a quarter-mile (0.4 km) before the exit, thus forcing many to merge across multiple lanes in a very short distance. The signs were inspected by Caltrans to ensure they would not fall off onto the road below. Ankrom was never charged, despite statements from officials that his actions were illegal. Ankrom referred to his sign project as "Guerilla Public Service".

Caltrans later added an additional "5 North" sign over the left northbound lane at the entrance to the Figueroa Street Tunnels, as well as new electric signage, which will note when an additional lane is available for those wishing to transition to northbound I-5 (converting the current single lane transition to dual lanes).

In 2009, Caltrans replaced all signage along this segment with newer, more reflective versions. These new signs include Ankrom's original improvements.

== Preservation ==
Despite the increased traffic in Los Angeles, including trucks shipping products from the Port of Los Angeles in San Pedro, there are no plans to upgrade the rest of I-110 from I-10 to Pasadena to Interstate standards. Instead, Caltrans has pushed for a protected status alternative to preserve the Arroyo Seco Parkway as a historic landmark. The state legislature designated the original section, north of the Figueroa Street Viaduct, as a "California Historic Parkway" (part of the State Scenic Highway System reserved for freeways built before 1945) in 1993; the only other highway so designated is the Cabrillo Freeway (SR 163) in San Diego. The American Society of Civil Engineers named it a National Historic Civil Engineering Landmark in 1999, and it became a National Scenic Byway in 2002.

== Exit list ==
The entire route is in Los Angeles County.

Location	mi	km	Exit	Destinations	Notes
San Pedro	0.93	1.50		Gaffey Street – San Pedro	Southern terminus of I-110/Harbor Freeway
San Pedro	0.93	1.50	1A	SR 47 (Vincent Thomas Bridge) – Terminal Island, Long Beach	SR 47 exit 1B
San Pedro	1.23	1.98	1B	Channel Street / Pacific Avenue	Southbound entrance goes directly to SR 47 north
San Pedro	2.77	4.46	3A	Harry Bridges Boulevard	Reconstructed in 2016 from the formerly signed C Street interchange
Wilmington	3.26	5.25	3B	Anaheim Street	
Wilmington–Harbor City line	4.06	6.53	4	SR 1 (Pacific Coast Highway) – Torrance, Beach Cities	
West Carson–Carson line	5.45	8.77	5	Sepulveda Boulevard	
West Carson–Carson line	6.52	10.49	7A	223rd Street	Northbound access is via exit 7
West Carson–Carson line	7.02	11.30	7B	Carson Street	Signed as exit 7 northbound
West Carson–Carson line	7.74	12.46	8	Torrance Boulevard	
Carson–Los Angeles line	8.78– 9.07	14.13– 14.60	9	I-405 (San Diego Freeway) / 190th Street – Santa Monica, Long Beach	190th Street is not signed northbound; I-405 is former SR 7; I-405 north exit 37, south exit 37A
Los Angeles	9.87	15.88	10A	SR 91 east (Gardena Freeway)	Signed as exit 10 southbound; SR 91 west exit 6
Los Angeles	9.87	15.88	10B	SR 91 west (Gardena Freeway)	Signed as exit 10 southbound; SR 91 west exit 6
Los Angeles			—	I-110 Express Lanes	Southern end of Express Lanes on mainline I-110
Los Angeles			—	Harbor Gateway Transit Center	Express Lanes access only; southbound exit and northbound entrance; connects to West 182nd Street
Los Angeles			—	Alondra Boulevard	Former northbound exit only; removed in 1987 during construction of the Redondo Beach Boulevard interchange.
Los Angeles	11.24	18.09	11	Redondo Beach Boulevard	
Los Angeles	11.89	19.14	12	Rosecrans Avenue	
Los Angeles	12.90	20.76	13	El Segundo Boulevard	
Los Angeles	13.82	22.24	14A	I-105 east (Glenn Anderson Freeway) – Norwalk	Judge Harry Pregerson Interchange; signed as exit 14A southbound; I-105 exit 7B
Los Angeles	13.85	22.29	14B	I-105 west (Glenn Anderson Freeway) – LAX Airport	Judge Harry Pregerson Interchange; signed as exit 14A southbound; I-105 exit 7B
Los Angeles			—	I-105 east	Express Lanes access only; southbound exit and northbound entrance
Los Angeles	13.97	22.48	14B	Imperial Highway	Northbound exit is part of I-105 west
Los Angeles			—	I-105 west – LAX Airport	Express Lanes access only; southbound exit and northbound entrance
Los Angeles	14.97	24.09	15	Century Boulevard	No southbound entrance
Los Angeles	15.98	25.72	16	Manchester Avenue	Former SR 42
Los Angeles	16.98	27.33	17	Florence Avenue	
Los Angeles	17.51	28.18	18A	Gage Avenue	
Los Angeles	17.98	28.94	18B	Slauson Avenue	
Los Angeles	18.50	29.77	19A	51st Street	Southbound exit and northbound entrance
Los Angeles	19.00	30.58	19B	Vernon Avenue	Signed as exit 19 northbound
Los Angeles	19.50	31.38	20A	Martin Luther King Jr. Boulevard – Los Angeles Memorial Coliseum, Exposition Park, Banc of California Stadium	Formerly Santa Barbara Avenue
Los Angeles			—	39th Street – Coliseum	Express Lanes access only; northbound exit and southbound entrance
Los Angeles	20.00	32.19	20B	37th Street / Exposition Boulevard	
Los Angeles			—	I-110 Express Lanes	Northernmost access point on mainline I-110
Los Angeles			—	Adams Boulevard / Figueroa Street	Express Lanes access only; northbound exit and southbound entrance
Los Angeles	20.71	33.33	20C	Adams Boulevard	Exits only; southbound access is via I-10 east exit
Los Angeles	21.44	34.50	21	I-10 (Santa Monica Freeway) – Santa Monica, San Bernardino	Dosan Ahn Chang Ho Memorial Interchange; northern terminus of I-110; southern terminus of SR 110; southbound exit ramp to I-10 west provides direct exit to Washington Boulevard; southbound exit ramp to I-10 east provides direct exit to Grand Avenue / Olive Street – Convention Center; I-10 east exits 13A-B, west exit 13
Los Angeles	21.76– 22.12	35.02– 35.60	22A	Pico Boulevard / Olympic Boulevard – Downtown Los Angeles	Northbound access is via I-10 west exit
Los Angeles	22.36	35.98	22B	James M. Wood Boulevard / 9th Street / 8th Street	Signed as exit 22 northbound; James M. Wood not signed southbound, 8th Street not signed northbound
Los Angeles	22.83	36.74	23A	6th Street / Wilshire Boulevard	
Los Angeles	23.04	37.08	23B	4th Street	
Los Angeles	23.04	37.08	23C	3rd Street	
Los Angeles	23.73	38.19	24A	US 101 south to I-5 south (Santa Ana Freeway) / I-10 east (San Bernardino Freeway) / SR 60 east (Pomona Freeway)	Four Level Interchange; northern end of Harbor Freeway; southern end of Arroyo Seco Parkway; US 101 north exit 3, south exit 3B
Los Angeles	23.73	38.19	24A	US 101 north (Hollywood Freeway) – Ventura	Four Level Interchange; northern end of Harbor Freeway; southern end of Arroyo Seco Parkway; US 101 north exit 3, south exit 3B
Los Angeles	23.96	38.56	24B	Sunset Boulevard	Southbound exit and northbound entrance
Los Angeles	24.55	39.51	24C	Hill Street – Chinatown, Civic Center	No southbound entrance; signed as exit 24B northbound; left exit southbound
Los Angeles	24.73	39.80	24D	Stadium Way – Dodger Stadium	Signed as exit 24B northbound
Los Angeles	24.90	40.07	Figueroa Street Tunnel No. 1; northbound only		
Los Angeles	25.04	40.30	25	Solano Avenue / Academy Road	
Los Angeles	25.14– 25.37	40.46– 40.83	Figueroa Street Tunnels No. 2-4; northbound only		
Los Angeles	25.48	41.01	26A	I-5 north (Golden State Freeway) – Sacramento	Northbound left exit and southbound entrance; I-5 south exit 137B
Los Angeles	25.78	41.49	26B	Figueroa Street	Northbound left exit and southbound entrance; former SR 159
Los Angeles	25.91	41.70	26A	Avenue 26	Southbound exit and northbound entrance; former SR 163
Los Angeles	26.12	42.04	26B	I-5 (Golden State Freeway) – Santa Ana, Sacramento	Southbound exit and northbound entrance; I-5 north exit 137B, south exit 137A
Los Angeles	27.12	43.65	27	Avenue 43	
Los Angeles	28.05	45.14	28A	Avenue 52	
Los Angeles	28.38	45.67	28B	Via Marisol	
Los Angeles	28.76	46.28	29	Avenue 60	
Los Angeles	29.28	47.12	30A	Marmion Way / Avenue 64	Northbound exit and southbound entrance
Los Angeles	29.50	47.48	30	York Boulevard	Southbound exit and entrance
Los Angeles	30.10	48.44	30B	Bridewell Street	Northbound exit only
South Pasadena	30.59	49.23	31A	Orange Grove Avenue	
South Pasadena–Pasadena line	31.17	50.16	31B	Fair Oaks Avenue	No northbound entrance
Pasadena	31.91	51.35		Glenarm Street – Light Rail	At-grade intersection; northern terminus of SR 110/Arroyo Seco Parkway
Pasadena	31.91	51.35		Arroyo Parkway – Light Rail, Rose Bowl, Huntington Library	Continuation beyond Glenarm Street
1.000 mi = 1.609 km; 1.000 km = 0.621 mi: Closed/former; Electronic toll collection; Incomplete access; Route transition
