= Century Housing Corporation =

Nonprofit organization in Culver City, California, United States

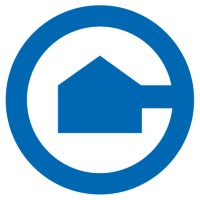
- Predecessor: Century Freeway Housing Program
- Formation: July 26, 1995
- Type: Nonprofit organization, CDFI
- Tax ID no.: 95-4540326
- Legal status: Tax exempt charity under IRC Section 501(c)(3)
- Purpose: Affordable housing finance and development
- Headquarters: Culver City, CA, USA
- Coordinates: 33.987670°N 118.389844°W
- Region served: State of California
- President & CEO: Jacqueline Waggoner
- Chief Financial Officer: William Wong
- Chief Strategy Officer: Beulah Ku
- Board of directors: Robert Abbasi, Christopher David Ruiz Cameron, John Chiang, Carrie Hawkins, R. Steven Lewis, Daniel B. Lopez, Anita Nelson, Louise Oliver, Kristina Olsen, Gregory Robinson, Darroch "Rocky" Young
- Website: www.century.org
- Formerly called: Century Freeway Housing Program

The Century Housing Corporation, often called Century Housing or simply Century, is a Culver City, California-based private, nonprofit lender to developers building affordable housing targeting low- and moderate-income wage earners. Founded as the Century Freeway Housing Program in 1979, Century Housing and its predecessor have financed more than 63,000 affordable homes throughout California.

== History ==
=== Century Freeway ===
Century Housing, and its predecessor, the Century Freeway Housing Program (CFHP), was initially created in response to the environmental and social impacts expected from development of the Century Freeway, one of the last urban segments of the Interstate Highway System to be developed in an existing urban area before fiscal realities ended the growth of freeway development. The Century Freeway was originally included in the 1958 Master Plan of Freeways and Express ways prepared by the Metropolitan Transportation Engineering Board (MTEB), and previous plans dating from 1956, and was proposed to go from the Los Angeles International Airport east to the City of Riverside. Despite being referenced with different route numbers, it remained a part of the California highway master plan, and by 1979 was included in District 7 Highway System as I-105, was planned to extend from El Segundo immediately south of Los Angeles International Airport (LAX) about 20 miles east to intersect with Interstate 5 in Norwalk, passing through the communities of Los Angeles, Hawthorne, Inglewood, Willowbrook, Lynwood, Paramount, Bellflower, Downey, and Norwalk. Ultimately, due to the opposition of Norwalk and the lack of capacity on Interstate 5, the right of way was terminated at the western edge of Norwalk, just east of the intersection with Interstate 605.

=== Keith v. Volpe ===
In 1972, before the construction of Century Freeway began, members of the community brought a lawsuit against the state and federal agencies responsible for the funding and construction of the freeway. The suit sought to require changes to the design of the freeway to reduce the environmental effects of the freeway on surrounding communities and regional air quality, mitigate the economic effects of the disruption to the community, extend employment and subcontracting opportunities to local residents and businesses, eliminate perceived racial and economic discrimination against displacees seeking replacement housing, and assure the availability of replacement housing for residents whose homes would be destroyed by the construction activities. The U.S. District Court issued a preliminary injunction in July 1972, prohibiting further work until federal and state officials complied with environmental and relocation assistance statutes. Litigants asked the issued an injunction to stop the state and federal governments from constructing the freeway until its environmental impact—including the depletion of the housing stock in the area surrounding the proposed freeway—could be evaluated and minimized. The case, presided over by then-District Court Judge Harry Pregerson, prevented construction for several years.

In 1979, the parties to the lawsuit entered into a consent decree (amended in 1981), and the Court lifted the preliminary injunction, permitting construction to go forward. The consent decree imposed a replacement requirement on the transportation agencies, under the provisions of the Uniform Relocation Act requiring public agencies to provide replacement housing as a "last resort" where it is found that there is an inadequate supply of housing to accommodate the persons being displaced by the construction. The consent decree established three separate programs: (1) 1,025 units were to be built through rehabilitation of new construction and made available to eligible purchasers or renters (the 1025 Program Segment); (2) 1,175 units were to be built to meet the needs of corridor residents eligible for benefits under the relocation act (the 1175 Program Segment); and, (3) as many units as possible were to be built from a federal commitment of $110 million plus the state's pro rata share (the $110 Million Program Segment). Any proceeds from sale of the housing developed by the $110 Million Program Segment were to be recycled into the program for reuse in developing additional housing.

=== Century Freeway Housing Program ===
The terms of the consent decree required development of replacement housing. In order to carry out this mandate, the Century Freeway Housing Program (CFHP) was created as a division of the California Department of Housing and Community Development (CalHCD). CalHCD created the Century Freeway Replenishment Housing Program, Housing Plan and Environmental Assessment in 1982.

Housing Plan and Environmental Assessment for Century Freeway Housing Program pursuant to Keith v. Volpe lawsuit

This plan implemented the consent decree's three programs within a "primary zone" of development approximating a band within six miles of the I-105 right-of-way. The CFHP was charged with creating a minimum of 3,700 homes at prices that fit the budgets of low- and medium-income families to replenish the housing stock that would be lost due to the construction of the freeway. The work of the CFHP was overseen by the Federal Highway Administration, as well as California state agencies.

Initially, the CFHP acted as a developer, acquiring land, and building single-family homes, condominiums, and rental apartments, or purchased completed units from private developers on a turnkey basis. In 1987, media reports claimed that the CFHP housing program was a failure, pointing to high costs, high vacancy rates, and opposition to the public housing development model being used for some housing. The charges led to calls for investigations by Congress and the grand jury. The Center for Law in the Public Interest (CLIPI), representing the plaintiffs in the Keith v. Volpe lawsuit, proposed in 1988 that the housing replacement program be completed by a to-be-formed nonprofit corporation, not CFHP. The proposed Century Community Housing Corp. would have been charged with building 2,500 new dwellings in three years, compared to the 1,300 units completed by CFHP over the prior seven years. The new entity was to be governed by a board including elected and appointed officials from affected cities, and was expected to compete for tax credits, tax exempt bond allocations, and other federal, state and local housing finance resources against other affordable housing developers to leverage the funds from the FHWA and Caltrans.

While CLIPI's proposal was not accepted, CFHP did alter its approach. In 1989, after several years of direct development activity, the CFHP was restructured to become a lender to provide a more efficient development process and to maximize leveraging opportunities with public and private lending sources.

== Privatization ==
In July 1995, after the completion of the freeway and meeting of the initial housing development goal, all parties agreed to the privatization of the CFHP as the Century Housing Corporation, the only known conversion of a California state program to a private, nonprofit corporation. The court retained oversight of the new entity, including appointment of members to its board of directors. The initial Board included Carl Covitz, Norm Emerson, Carrie Hawkins, G. Allan Kingston (who had served as the executive director of CFHP and was acting as administrator/trustee during the transition, and later would be president/CEO of the new nonprofit), Stephen McDonald, Robert J. Norris, Jr. (who had served as associate director of CFHP, and would later become executive vice president of the new nonprofit), William Park, William Robertson, and Ronne Lynn Thielen.

Century, now governed by its board of directors, was admitted as a defendant in Keith v. Volpe and became a party to the consent decree, with the responsibility to manage the assets of and honor the obligations of the housing program. Among other changes, Century Housing proposed altering some of the limitations of the consent decree, including expanding the geographic area in which its operations could be undertaken. Originally constrained to a zone of communities lying within six miles of the freeway right-of-way, the consent decree was amended to expand it to include communities within twelve miles of the freeway. Century Housing sought to expand this zone even farther away from the freeway, as well as shift its housing financing from outright grants or "soft debt" deep subsidy long-term financing which the borrowers were not required to repay for decades, to shorter term financing which developers would be expected to repay. This was opposed by plaintiffs representatives.

== Century Housing ==
Century's role—stocking the housing market with more options for working families and individuals—continues through loan and credit enhancement products, including construction financing, bridge loans, property acquisition and predevelopment loans, subordinate bond guarantees, subordinate bonds, and credit lines.

=== Lending ===
Century provides development capital to both for-profit and not-for-profit developers seeking to build housing that will be rented at affordable prices to persons and families who have moderate-, low-, very low- and extremely low-incomes throughout California. Most of these developers utilize government subsidy program funds as long-term (>20 years) capital, as well as funding from private financial institutions. While these government housing subsidy programs are highly competitive, once the developer receives commitments from these agencies, borrowing on short-term basis, e.g., to buy the materials and hire the labor to construct the housing, is relatively easy to acquire. However, financial institutions consider any loan made before the proposed projects have been approved for these government subsidy programs to be high risk, because of the uncertainty of whether, and when, such commitments might be secured. Century provides loans in this space successfully, and has had a very low default rate (<2% since its founding).

Century funds its loans to affordable housing developers from a combination of its own capital assets, lines of credit provided by commercial banks and charitable foundations, and participation in publicly sponsored loan funds, including the City of Los Angeles New Generation Fund, the Los Angeles County Housing Innovation Fund and the State of California Golden State Acquisition Fund. Century's financing of housing developments is typically early-stage, relatively high risk capital provided to borrowers to acquire property, perform necessary predevelopment studies and analyses, line up construction and permanent capital from public agencies and other private lenders, and acquire needed permits from public agencies. For some developers, Century also provides construction capital. The entitlement and financing process may require two or more years, and Century's loans are usually repaid from the construction or permanent financing the developer acquires from others.

=== Housing ===
Upon formation, Century assumed all of the assets and liabilities of the Century Freeway Housing Program, which included a considerable portfolio of rental apartments, as well as notes from loans made by the Freeway Program secured by single-family homes, condominiums and apartment buildings developed during construction of the Century Freeway. Over time, almost all of the owned properties were sold or transferred to other community development organizations, and most of the notes have been repaid as older developments are refinanced, often in order to renovate them to maintain the quality of the housing. However, Century has remained as owner, developer and property manager of one significant property, and has acquired interests in several other smaller properties in the greater Los Angeles metropolitan area.

==== Century Villages at Cabrillo ====
The Century Villages at Cabrillo, a 27-acre site in western Long Beach originally housed families assigned to the Long Beach Naval Shipyard, which was closed by the 1991 Base Realignment and Closure Commission (BRAC). In partial satisfaction of the requirements of the McKinney–Vento Homeless Assistance Act, when the Long Beach Naval Shipyard was closed, the BRAC deeded the Cabrillo and Savannah Navy Housing sites to the City of Long Beach, with the understanding that the property would then be transferred to Century Housing for development of housing to assist the homeless, and to the California State University, Long Beach Foundation (CSULB Foundation)

On the portion conveyed to the CSULB Foundation, the existing structures were demolished and replaced by a technology park, vocational center and job incubator. A portion of the remaining undeveloped property is proposed for development of a "big box" retail store.

The portion of the property which passed to Century Housing has been developed in stages to provide housing for homeless persons, including emergency shelters, transitional housing, a substance abuse recovery program operated by the U.S. Department of Veterans Affairs, and permanent supportive housing for households with family members who are disabled. Services are provided by some 20 health and employment readiness organizations, both public and private. The property now houses over 1,000 previously homeless men, women and children, over half of whom are armed forces veterans.

=== Active Century Affiliates ===
Century Housing has created special purpose affiliates to undertake specific activities. Some of these are single-asset entities which own properties and are structured as limited partnerships or limited liability companies to facilitate compliance with federal tax laws, particularly the requirements of the Low-Income Housing Tax Credit (LIHTC) program. Others are designed to manage relationships with financial institutions who provide capital which Century Housing lends to developers of low- and moderate-income affordable housing. In addition, there are four affiliated corporations:

- Century Affordable Development, Inc. (CADI) holds title to properties acquired through foreclosure or purchase for development purposes.
- Century Pointe, Inc. holds title to Century's corporate offices and supports Century's nonprofit operations.
- Century Villages at Cabrillo, Inc. holds title to former United States Navy property in Long Beach for development of housing and services benefiting homeless persons, especially military veterans.

=== Past Century Affiliates ===
Century Housing assumed responsibility for several Century Freeway programs not directly related to its primary mission of housing finance and development, and created other affiliates to provide services to the community. These programs were operated under Century Housing's More Than Shelter umbrella of services. Most of these programs have either been incubated to full independence, integrated with other community development organizations, or closed because other organizations provided the same services.

- Century Learning Initiatives For Today, Inc. (Century/LIFT) provided after school tutoring services to assist low-income students improve learning skills and maximize academic achievement. This program was determined to be duplicative of services being provided by public school districts with funding from federal sources, and California Proposition 49 (2002), including especially the Los Angeles Unified School District Beyond the Bell After School programs, and was closed in 2010.
- Century Community Training, Inc. provided job training placement services and post employment counseling to unemployed, underemployed persons living in low-income communities, primarily through pre-apprenticeship programs in cooperation with construction labor unions. This program was merged into the Center for Economic Opportunity, Inc. another entity created as a result of the Century Freeway project, in 2011.
- Century Community Charter Schools, Inc. operated two public charter schools, the Century Community Charter School and Century Academy for Excellence, located in the City of Inglewood and chartered by the Lennox School District. After establishment and period of incubation, these two charter schools were able to self-finance their on-going operations, and became completely independent of Century Housing in 2011.
- More Than Shelter for Seniors, Inc. was established to provide enriched living services to residents of Century-funded senior housing complexes. In 2006, this entity became completely independent as EngAGE, which continues to provide life-enhancing services to low-income seniors living in affordable apartment communities.
- Century Community Development, Inc. was created to qualify as a Community Development Financial Institution (CDFI) in the early years of that program. In 2010, Century Housing (the parent organization) was certified as a CDFI, and this entity was no longer needed.
- Century Community Children's Centers, Inc. owned Century's children's centers.
