= Interstate 105 (California) =

Auxiliary Interstate Highway in Los Angeles County, California, United States

Interstate 105
- Century Freeway; Glenn Anderson Freeway
- I-105 highlighted in red

Route information
- Auxiliary route of I-5
- Maintained by Caltrans
- Length: 18.82 mi (30.29 km) 17.64 miles (28.39 km) per FHWA
- History: 1963–1968 near East Los Angeles Interchange part of US 101 (Santa Ana Freeway); 1982–1993 Century Freeway (completed)
- NHS: Entire route

Major junctions
- West end: SR 1 near El Segundo
- I-405 on the Los Angeles-Hawthorne border I-110 in Los Angeles; I-710 on the Lynwood-Paramount border
- East end: I-605 / Studebaker Rd in Norwalk

Location
- Country: United States
- State: California
- Counties: Los Angeles

Highway system
- Interstate Highway System; Main; Auxiliary; Suffixed; Business; Future; State highways in California; Interstate; US; State; Scenic; History; Pre‑1964; Unconstructed; Deleted; Freeways
← SR 104	→ SR 107

Interstate 105 (I-105, locally referred to as the 105) is an east–west auxiliary Interstate Highway in the Greater Los Angeles urban area of Southern California. It runs from State Route 1 (SR 1) near El Segundo and Los Angeles International Airport (LAX) to Studebaker Road in the City of Norwalk. It is commonly known as the Century Freeway after Century Boulevard which it parallels, and also officially known as the Glenn Anderson Freeway after the late congressman Glenn M. Anderson who advocated for its construction.

== Route description ==
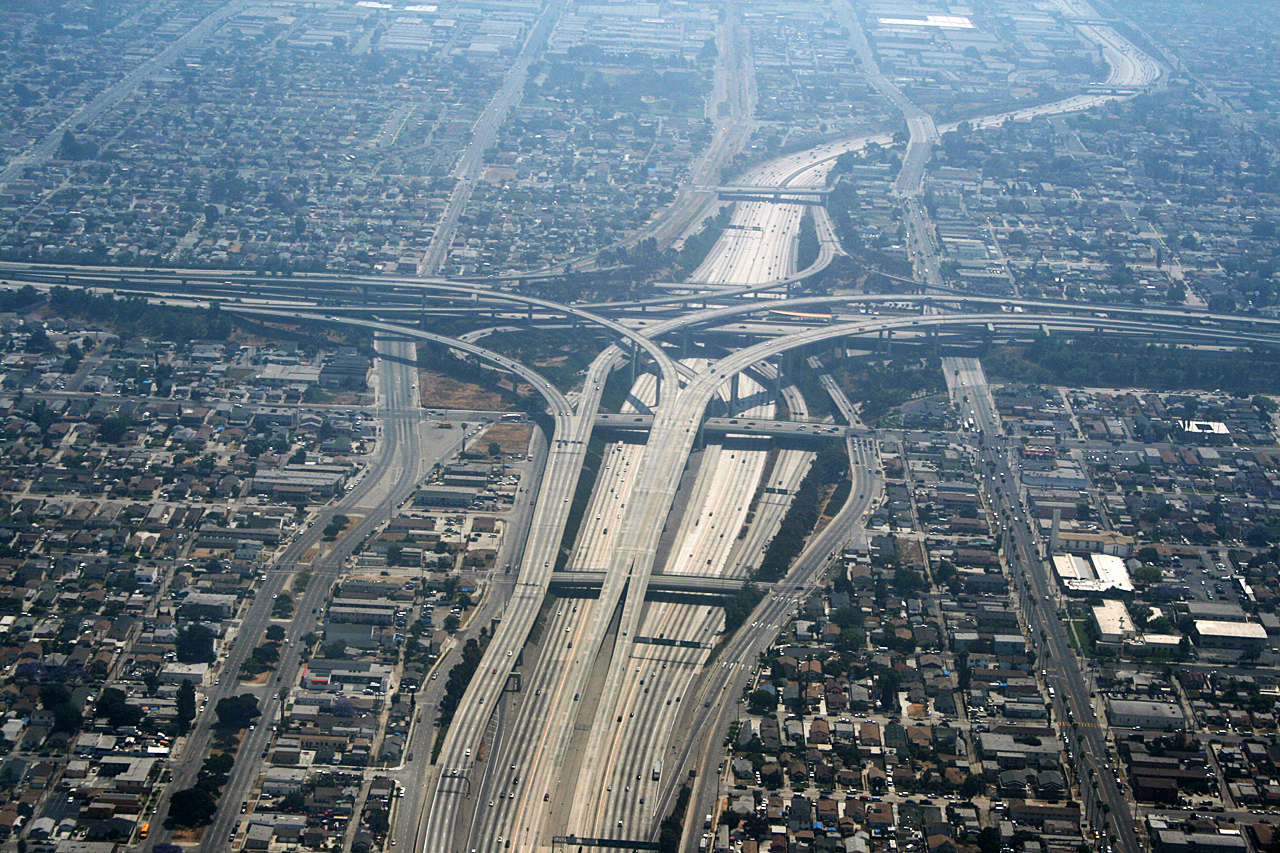
The Judge Harry Pregerson Interchange with the Harbor Freeway (I-110)

The entirety of I-105 is defined in section 405 of the California Streets and Highways Code as Route 105, and that the highway is from "Pershing Drive near El Segundo to Route 605".

Route 105 was never fully constructed as it is defined. Currently, the western terminus of I-105 is at Sepulveda Boulevard (SR 1) and Imperial Highway on the southern edge of Los Angeles International Airport (LAX), near the El Segundo–Los Angeles line. Motorists can still continue west via Imperial Highway over conventional roadway to Pershing Drive. Caltrans actually set Route 105's mile 0 along Imperial Highway about 0.5 miles (0.80 km) west of SR 1, but that segment is neither signed as part of I-105 or included in the Federal Highway Administration (FHWA)'s Interstate Highway route logs. Caltrans does not have any intention to adopt Imperial Highway further west to Pershing Drive as part of the state highway system or construct an extension of I-105 over it. A portion of undeveloped land south of this section of Imperial Highway exists to facilitate a potential extension of the freeway.

East of Sepulveda Boulevard, I-105 intersects with I-405 (San Diego Freeway) at the Lennox–Hawthorne line, then continues east near the northern city limits of Hawthorne and the southern city limits of Inglewood. Upon reaching the Harbor Gateway neighborhood of Los Angeles, I-105 intersects with I-110 at the five-level Judge Harry Pregerson Interchange. I-105 continues east into Willowbrook before entering the city of Lynwood, where it has a four-level interchange with I-710 and crosses the Los Angeles River. I-105 then runs through Paramount before entering Downey. In Downey, I-105 intersects with Lakewood Boulevard (SR 19). I-105 then enters Norwalk, where it meets with I-605. Although Route 105's aforementioned state legal definition sets its eastern terminus at I-605, the HOV lanes extend approximately 0.3 miles (0.48 km) further east to an at-grade intersection with Studebaker Road; this segment is also included in both state and federal records.

The freeway never intersects its parent route, I-5. I-105 complies with numbering conventions by intersecting other auxiliary routes of I-5 that do intersect I-5, namely I-405 and I-605.

Much of the length of the Century Freeway runs parallel to Imperial Highway. It also runs parallel to (and 1 mi (1.6 km) south of) Century Boulevard, from which its original name is derived. Century Boulevard, in turn, is named for its position equivalent to 100th Street in the Los Angeles grid.

The Los Angeles Metro Rail C Line runs in the median of nearly the entire length of I-105. The C Line's eastern terminus is at Norwalk, at the interchange between I-105 and I-605. 2 mi (3.2 km) from the western end of the freeway, the C Line separates onto its own right-of-way at Aviation Boulevard before turning north towards the LAX area, where a future people mover connecting Metro Rail to airport terminals is scheduled to open in 2026.

I-105 is part of the California Freeway and Expressway System, and is part of the National Highway System, a network of highways that are considered essential to the country's economy, defense, and mobility by the Federal Highway Administration.

== History ==
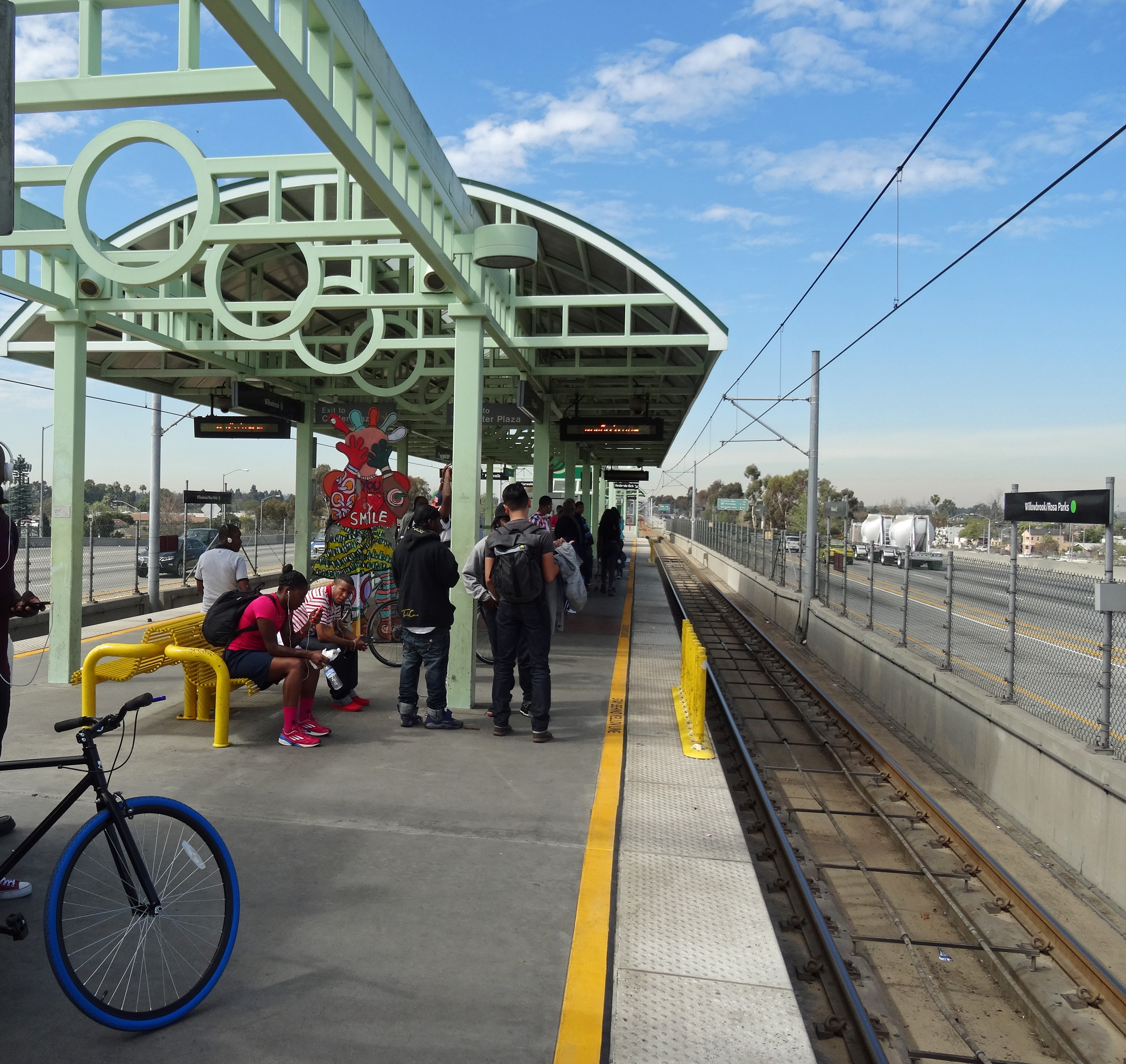
Metro C Line platform at Willowbrook/Rosa Parks station, which lies between the east and westbound lanes of I-105

=== Early planning ===
I-105 was an integral part of a Caltrans 1960s master plan for the Southern California freeway system, but did not open until 1993. The right-of-way was included on several early highway plans since at least 1947, although it was not named the "Century Freeway" until 1956, and was numbered Route 42. In 1965, the Century Freeway was added to the state system originated at State Route 1 (Sepulveda Boulevard) east to Central Avenue in the City of Los Angeles along an alignment very near to the current right-of-way. The current route was added to the Interstate system in 1968.

=== Design and local opposition ===
The route was designed between 1968 and 1972 by Caltrans District 7, under the direction of Design Chief Sid Elicks. However, opposition from some of the communities through which the right-of-way would pass slowed the process and led to some reroutings. Many factors contributed to the delay. The growth of the environmental movement in the 1960s created resistance to new freeway construction. Fiscal difficulties brought about by the 1971 Sylmar earthquake and the California tax revolt of the late 1970s further hampered Caltrans' construction efforts.

The major source of resistance to the freeway's construction was community opposition and the side effects of these demands. By the early 1970s, most of the areas in the freeway's path (and thus slated to be demolished) were predominantly African-American. Resentment over previous freeway projects' effects on other black communities resulted in significant modifications to the original route. Most cities along the way, weary of the noise and visual blight created by elevated freeways, demanded that the route be built far below grade in a "trench". Also, another source for resistance to the freeway's construction was that much of the I-105 path was going to be built in low income, high crime neighborhoods, which also delayed the freeway's construction until the crime in the areas went down.

Norwalk was opposed to the freeway's proposed route through its city center, and blocked the freeway from reaching its intended terminus at the Santa Ana Freeway (I-5); however, Caltrans had already decided to abandon that section due to the inability of the severely congested Santa Ana Freeway to accommodate any more traffic.

=== Keith v. Volpe ===
In 1972, community opposition resulted in a federal lawsuit, Keith v. Volpe, being filed, charging a violation of various civil rights protections and the National Environmental Policy Act (NEPA). An important figure in the freeway's history was Harry Pregerson, a United States federal judge who presided over the lawsuit concerning the freeway's construction and chose to continue presiding over the case despite being promoted to a higher level court. The interchange with I-110 is named the Judge Harry Pregerson Interchange in his honor. In 1972, Judge Pregerson enjoined the further development of the freeway until it has complied with the requirements of NEPA, the California Environmental Quality Act (CEQA), the Federal-Aid Highway Act, and the Uniform Relocation Assistance and Real Property Acquisition Act of 1970.

In 1979, this lawsuit resulted in a Consent Decree, amended in 1981, which imposed several conditions on the development of the freeway, including additional public hearings, preparation of an environmental report, alterations to the design to reduce lanes and intersections, improve carpooling and provide for a transitway, which became the Los Angeles Metro Rail Green Line, now known as the C Line. A portion of the right-of-way was also to be constructed below grade to buffer adjacent areas from the effects of traffic noise. After construction began in the 1980s, failure to perform a complete survey of the area's groundwater deposits, combined with the 20–30-foot (6.1–9.1 m) below-grade trench through the city of Downey, resulted in buckling and cracking along the eastern portions of the route. At one point, a giant sinkhole opened in the Bellflower Boulevard on-ramp. This resulted in the construction of an elaborate pump system along the freeway between the interchanges with I-710 and I-605.

=== Century Freeway Housing Program ===
A significant aspect of the Keith v. Volpe Consent Decree was the requirement that the housing removed to construct the freeway be replaced, leading to the creation of the Century Freeway Housing Program within the California Department of Housing and Community Development.

==== Notable demolished homes and buildings ====
The Hawthorne childhood home of Brian, Carl and Dennis Wilson of the Beach Boys was demolished in the mid-1980s to make way for the freeway, as was the house across the street where their bandmate David Marks grew up. In 2005, the Beach Boys Historic Landmark was built on the former site of the Wilson brothers' home and declared a California Historic Landmark.

The birthplace of former Metallica bassist Ron McGovney's house stood directly in the path of the route nearby to I-605 in Downey.

Another home in Downey, where siblings Richard and Karen Carpenter grew up before forming the musical duo the Carpenters, was also razed for I-105.

=== Post-construction ===
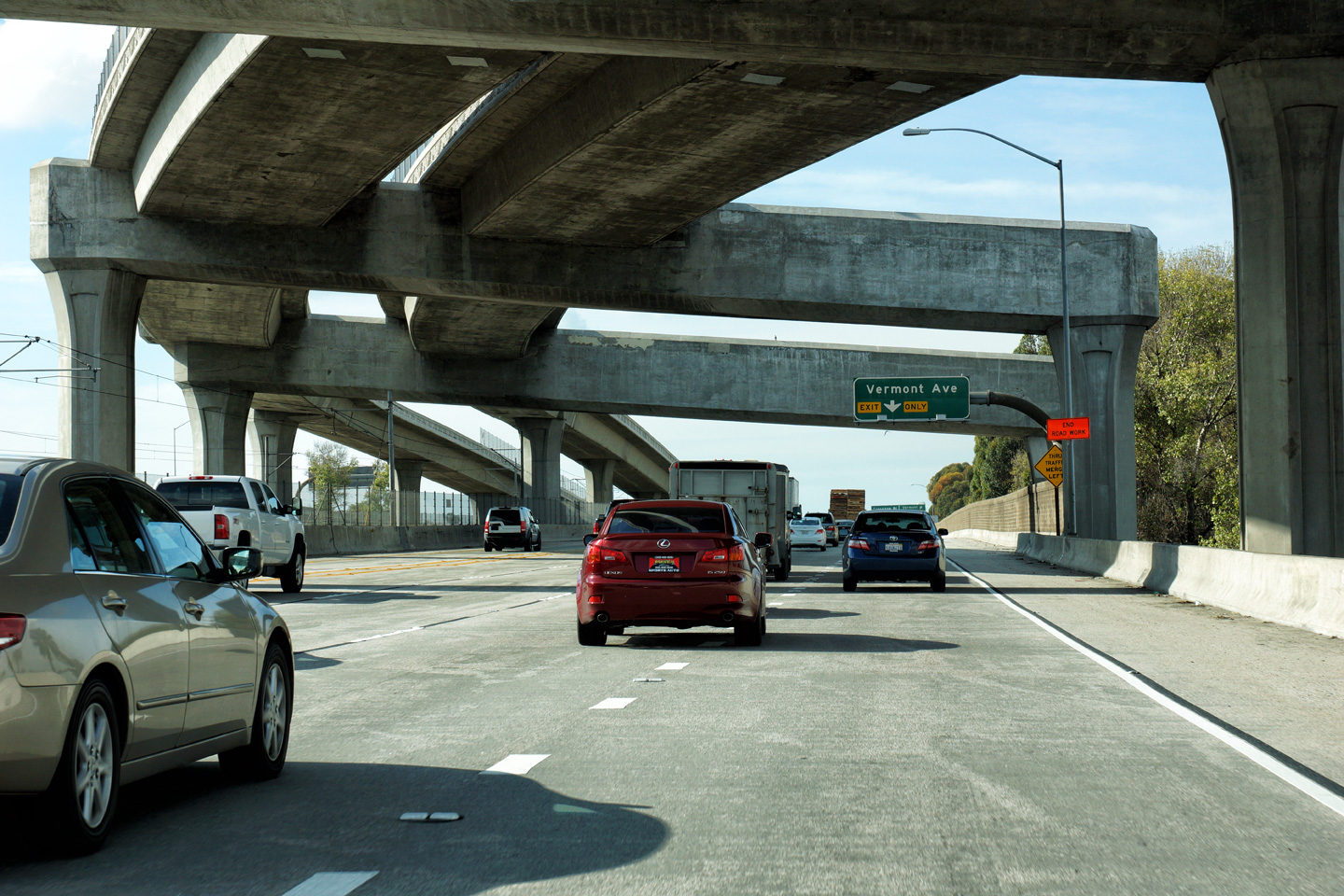
Westbound view along I-105 heading towards Vermont Ave, through the I-110 interchange

Throughout the difficulties, Congressman Glenn M. Anderson (D-San Pedro) tirelessly advocated for the route's construction, making claims it would provide congestion relief along Century, Manchester, and Firestone Boulevards and the Imperial Highway, as well as relieving pressure on the Santa Monica (I-10) and San Diego (I-405) Freeways for travelers between Downtown Los Angeles and LAX. After Anderson's death in 1994, Caltrans honored him by renaming the freeway in his honor. The route's original name, "Century Freeway", is still used on a number of maps.

The freeway was originally signed with El Segundo as its westbound control city; however, in recent years, many of the El Segundo signs have been replaced and/or covered with "LAX Airport" signage due to the western terminus' proximity to Los Angeles International Airport.

Shortly before opening, filmmakers had access to use the empty freeway for a number of weeks to film the 1994 motion picture Speed.

=== Interstate 105 (1964–68) ===
Previously, the I-105 designation was used for U.S. Route 101 (the Santa Ana Freeway, US 101) from I-5 (the Golden State Freeway) at the East Los Angeles Interchange to the connection to I-10 (the San Bernardino Freeway; this connection had been I-110); it went back to US 101 in 1968.

== Future ==
There are plans to convert the existing HOV lanes into high-occupancy toll (HOT) lanes. Segment 1 of the project between Sepulveda Bouelvard and Central Avenue is scheduled to be completed in 2028. As of 2025, both segment 2 between Central Avenue and I-710, and segment 3 between I-710 and Studebaker Road, are in the design and engineering phase.

== Exit list ==
The entire route is in Los Angeles County.

Location	mi	km	Exit	Destinations	Notes
Los Angeles	0.00	0.00	1A	Imperial Highway west	Continuation beyond the western terminus of Route 105 at this point; posted as exit 1A at the SR 1 (exits 1B–C) interchange
Los Angeles	0.05	0.080		California Street	At-grade intersection
Los Angeles			West end of freeway		
Los Angeles	0.50	0.80	1	Imperial Highway east	Eastbound signage; signed western terminus of I-105
Los Angeles	0.50	0.80	1B	SR 1 south (Sepulveda Boulevard)	Westbound signage
Los Angeles	0.50	0.80	1C	SR 1 north (Sepulveda Boulevard) – LAX Airport	Westbound signage
Los Angeles	0.99	1.59	1D	Nash Street – LAX Airport Alt. Exit	Westbound exit and eastbound entrance
Los Angeles	2.01	3.23	2A	La Cienega Boulevard / Aviation Boulevard	Westbound exit and eastbound entrance
Los Angeles–Lennox– Hawthorne–Del Aire quadripoint	2.01– 2.11	3.23– 3.40	2B	I-405 (San Diego Freeway) – Santa Monica, Long Beach	Sadao S. Munemori Memorial Interchange. Signed as exit 2 eastbound; former SR 7; I-405 north exit 45A, south exit 45
Hawthorne–Lennox– Inglewood tripoint	3.32	5.34	3	Prairie Avenue / Hawthorne Boulevard	Hawthorne Boulevard not signed eastbound
Hawthorne	4.71	7.58	5	Crenshaw Boulevard	
Los Angeles–West Athens line	6.77	10.90	7A	Vermont Avenue	
Los Angeles	7.39	11.89	7B	I-110 (Harbor Freeway) – Los Angeles, San Pedro	Judge Harry Pregerson Interchange; I-110 north exits 14A-B, south exit 14A
Los Angeles	7.39	11.89	—	I-110 Express Lanes north	Two-lane left exit; left lane tolled, right lane free HOV access only
Los Angeles–Willowbrook line	8.90	14.32	9	Central Avenue	
Willowbrook	9.78	15.74	10	Wilmington Avenue	
Lynwood	11.51	18.52	12	Long Beach Boulevard	
Lynwood–Paramount line	13.47	21.68	13	I-710 (Long Beach Freeway) – Pasadena, Long Beach	I-710 north exits 11A-B, south exit 11A
Paramount	14.13	22.74	14	Garfield Avenue	Eastbound exit and westbound entrance
Paramount	14.65	23.58	15	Paramount Boulevard	Westbound exit and eastbound entrance
Downey	15.67	25.22	16	SR 19 (Lakewood Boulevard)	
Downey	16.64	26.78	17	Bellflower Boulevard	
Norwalk	17.82	28.68	18A	I-605 south (San Gabriel River Freeway)	Eastern terminus for I-105's non-HOV traffic; I-605 exit 9B; exit to I-605 south also includes direct exit ramp for Rosecrans Avenue
Norwalk	17.82	28.68	18B	I-605 north (San Gabriel River Freeway)	Eastern terminus for I-105's non-HOV traffic; I-605 exit 9B; exit to I-605 south also includes direct exit ramp for Rosecrans Avenue
Norwalk	17.91	28.82	♦	Hoxie Avenue – Norwalk Metro Station	HOV exits only; all traffic allowed on entrances; westbound entrance also includes direct entrance ramp from Imperial Highway
Norwalk	18.15	29.21	♦	Studebaker Road	Eastern terminus of I-105's HOV lanes; all traffic is allowed on direct eastbound ramp from Hoxie Avenue; at-grade intersection
1.000 mi = 1.609 km; 1.000 km = 0.621 mi: Electronic toll collection; HOV only; Incomplete access
