= Caproni Ca.105 =

1930s Italian aircraft

Ca.105
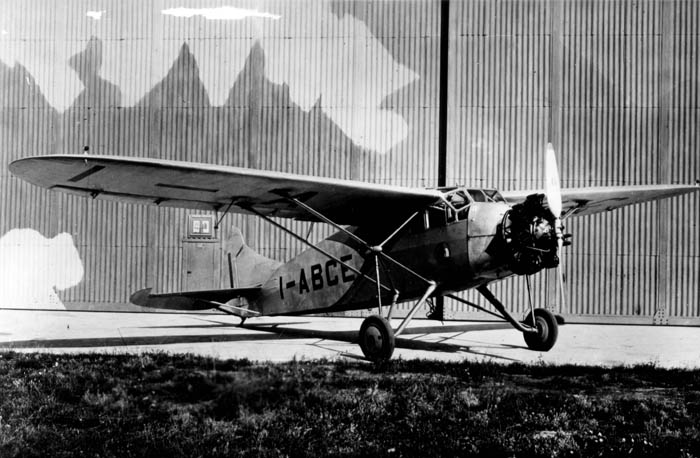
- Ca.105 I-ABCE used in a raid on Cape Town

General information
- Type: Reconnaissance aircraft/Airliner
- Manufacturer: Caproni
- Primary user: Regia Aeronautica
- Number built: 1

History
- Introduction date: 1930
- First flight: 1930
- Retired: 1934

The Caproni Ca.105 was a multirole high wing single engine monoplane developed by the Italian aeronautical company Aeronautica Caproni in the late 1920s.

== Design ==
The Ca.105 was an aircraft made in mixed technique that proposed a classic setting for the type of aircraft and for the role it was intended to cover both in civil and military, single engine in tractor configuration, high wing monoplane with closed cabin and fixed cart.

The fuselage, with rectangular section and realized with a structure in welded metallic trellis covered with treated canvas, integrates the cockpit to four places, the two front ones equipped with double controls and the others destined to the passengers.

The wing configuration was monoplane, with the wing positioned high on the fuselage and connected to it through a pair of brace rods on each side, rods that also served as a support for the cart. The structure was made of wood and was also covered in treated canvas, characterized by the possibility of being folded along the fuselage to facilitate hangarage operations.

The landing gear was a fixed bicycle with independent wheels, with the structure consisting of a vertical cushioned element connected to the bracing rods and anchored below the fuselage by V-shaped uprights, integrated at the back by a support pad positioned underneath tail.

== Operational history ==
Although owned by the Regia Aeronautica, the aircraft was given civil registration I-ABCE in anticipation of the raid that was to join Rome with Cape Town, South Africa . At the controls of the pilot couple Francis Lombardi and Leonida Robbiano, the aircraft took off from the airport of Rome in December 1931 in a southerly direction, but the long journey was interrupted in Tabora due to an inconvenience mechanic who forced the crew to return home.

On December 12, 1932, the aircraft was re-registered I-FOCO by the Ministry of Aeronautics and intended to remember the fallen of the first transatlantic Atlantic with a commemorative flight Rome-Bolama ( Portuguese Guinea ) on the occasion of the second anniversary on December 17 following. On that occasion the crew was formed by Leonida Robbiano and the journalist Mario Massai.

The Ca.105 remained in staff at the Regia Aeronautica until October 14, 1934, the date on which it was involved in an accident that compromised its repair. Declared out of commission, it was sent for demolition.

== Operators ==
Kingdom of Italy

- Regia Aeronautica

== Specifications (in airliner version) ==
Data from , Aeroplani Caproni dal 1908 al 1935

General characteristics

- Crew: 1
- Capacity: 3-4 passengers / 600 kg (1,300 lb) payload
- Length: 9.68 m (31 ft 9 in)
- Wingspan: 14 m (45 ft 11 in)
- Height: 3 m (9 ft 10 in)
- Wing area: 26 m^{2} (280 sq ft)
- Empty weight: 850 kg (1,874 lb)
- Gross weight: 1,450 kg (3,197 lb)
- Powerplant: 1 × Alfa Romeo Lynx 7-cylinder air-cooled radial piston engine, 150 kW (200 hp)
- Propellers: 2-bladed fixed-pitch propeller

Performance

- Maximum speed: 190 km/h (120 mph, 100 kn)
- Cruise speed: 175 km/h (109 mph, 94 kn)
- Range: 800 km (500 mi, 430 nmi)
- Service ceiling: 4,000 m (13,000 ft)

== See also ==
Related lists

- List of Interwar military aircraft
