= Judge Harry Pregerson Interchange =

Interchange in California

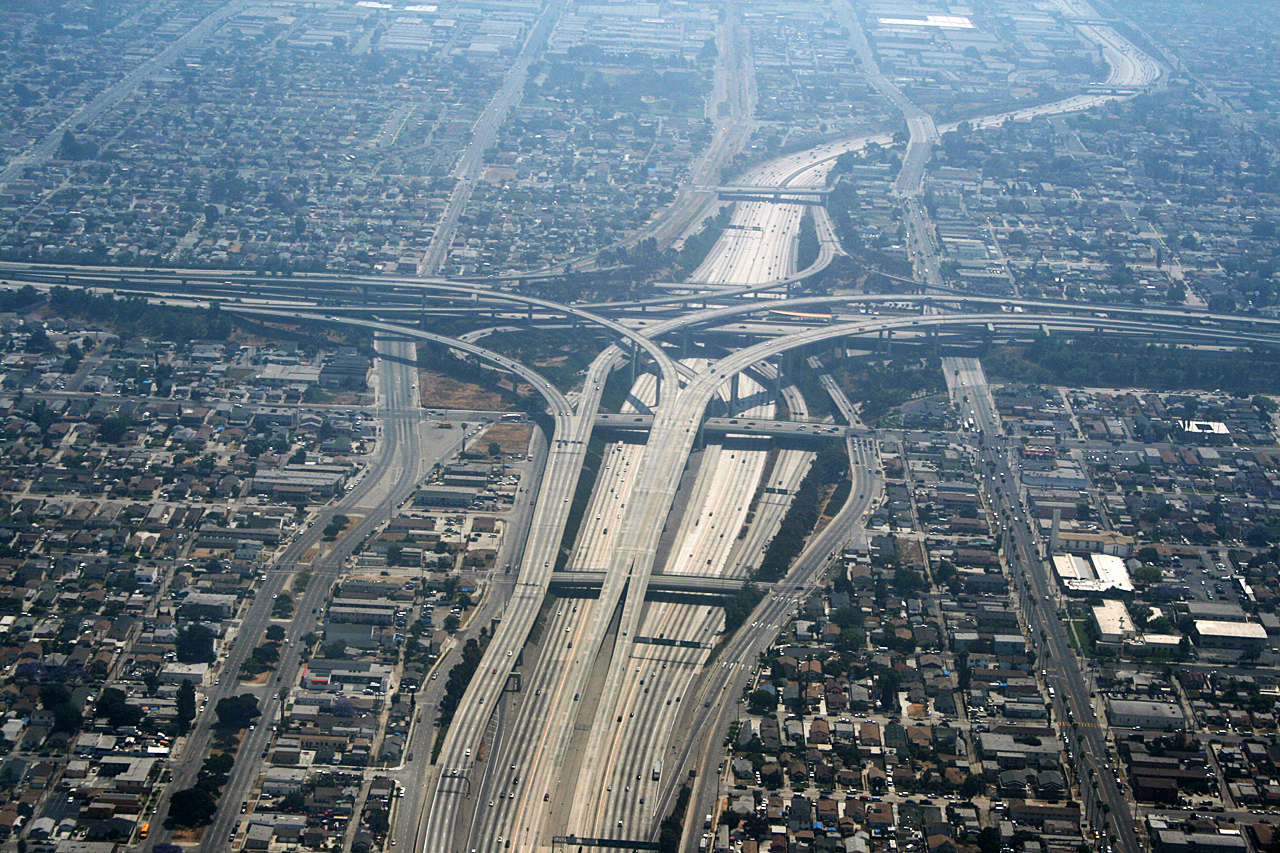
- The interchange looking southbound on I-110
- Interactive map of Judge Harry Pregerson Interchange

Location
- South Los Angeles, California, U.S.
- Coordinates: 33.9287°N 118.281°W
- Roads at junction: I-105; I-110

Construction
- Type: Five-level Stack interchange
- Opened: 1993
- Maximum height: 130 ft (40 m)
- Maintained by: Caltrans

The Judge Harry Pregerson Interchange is a five-level stack interchange near the Athens and Watts communities of Los Angeles, California. It is the interchange of the following routes:

- I-105 (Glenn M. Anderson Freeway) – El Segundo, LAX Airport, Norwalk
- I-110 (Harbor Freeway) – San Pedro, Los Angeles

The interchange permits traffic entering the interchange in all directions to exit in all directions (unlike, for example, the Hollywood Split and East Los Angeles Interchange). The interchange also contains Metro C Line tracks, direct HOV and Metro ExpressLanes connectors, the Harbor Transitway, and the Harbor Freeway station for the C Line and the Transitway, all of which contribute to the towering, imposing structure for which the interchange is known.

The interchange is over 130 feet (40 m) high. Opened with Interstate 105 in 1993, the interchange is named after Harry Pregerson, a longtime federal judge who presided over the lawsuit concerning the I-105 freeway's construction.

== Layout ==
Motorists entering the interchange on the freeway trunks from all directions have freedom to exit the interchange in all possible directions of travel (i.e., it is a complete interchange). Nearly all ramps are direct (an inherent advantage of the stack interchange design) and can be driven at near-mainline speeds if not congested; the main exception is the ramp from northbound I-110 to westbound I-105, which is a cloverleaf loop.

Traffic using the interchange's left-side connectors between the I-105 carpool (HOV) lanes and the I-110 Metro ExpressLanes (high-occupancy toll (HOT) lanes) is more restricted. Motorists entering eastbound or westbound on the I-105 HOV lanes may connect to the northbound I-110 HOT lanes. Motorists entering the interchange on the southbound I-110 HOT lanes may connect to either the eastbound or westbound I-105 HOV lanes, while motorists entering northbound on the I-110 HOT lanes do not have direct HOV connectors to I-105 and may only continue northbound. HOV/HOT drivers wishing to connect to a direction of travel for which there is no direct left-side connector must exit the HOV/HOT lane at a designated entry/exit point before the interchange and use the mainline connectors, as is typical for HOV lanes in Southern California.

=== Public transit ===
The interchange also houses the Harbor Freeway Metro station which jointly serves the Metro C Line light rail and Harbor Transitway bus corridor, which travel down the medians of I-105 and I-110, respectively.

== History ==
As described in a 1989 Los Angeles Times article, the interchange, connecting the existing I-110 with the new I-105 (then called the Century Freeway), was designed to be "biggest, tallest, most costly traffic structure yet built by California Department of Transportation" and "the first time the state's traffic engineers have integrated three modes of transportation--light-rail trains, high-occupancy vehicles and individual cars--into one giant intersection".

In 1996, the U.S. Federal Highway Administration recognized the Interstate 105/Interstate 110 interchange with an Award of Merit in the Urban Highways category of its biennial Excellence in Highway Design awards. The award recognized the interchange's design, which sought to improve traffic congestion, safety, and air quality.

== In popular culture ==
Shortly before the interchange opened, filmmakers had access to use it for the 1994 motion picture Speed. In one of the movie's best-known scenes, a bus must jump across an unfinished construction gap in an uncompleted elevated freeway-to-freeway ramp while still under construction. The highway section the bus jumped over is the directional ramp from I-105 WB to I-110 NB (not the fifth level HOV ramp from I-110 SB to I-105 WB as commonly believed), and as the flyover was already constructed, a gap was added in the editing process using computer-generated imagery with the help of Sony Pictures Imageworks. A 2009 episode of MythBusters attempted to recreate the bus jump as proposed, including the various tricks that they knew were used by the filmmakers such as the ramp, and proved that the jump, as in the film, would never have been possible.

For a full weekend in 2015, the left-side connector ramps between the I-105 HOV lanes and the I-110 HOT ExpressLanes were closed for filming the opening musical number of La La Land.
