= Figueroa Street Tunnels =

Series of freeway tunnels in Los Angeles, California

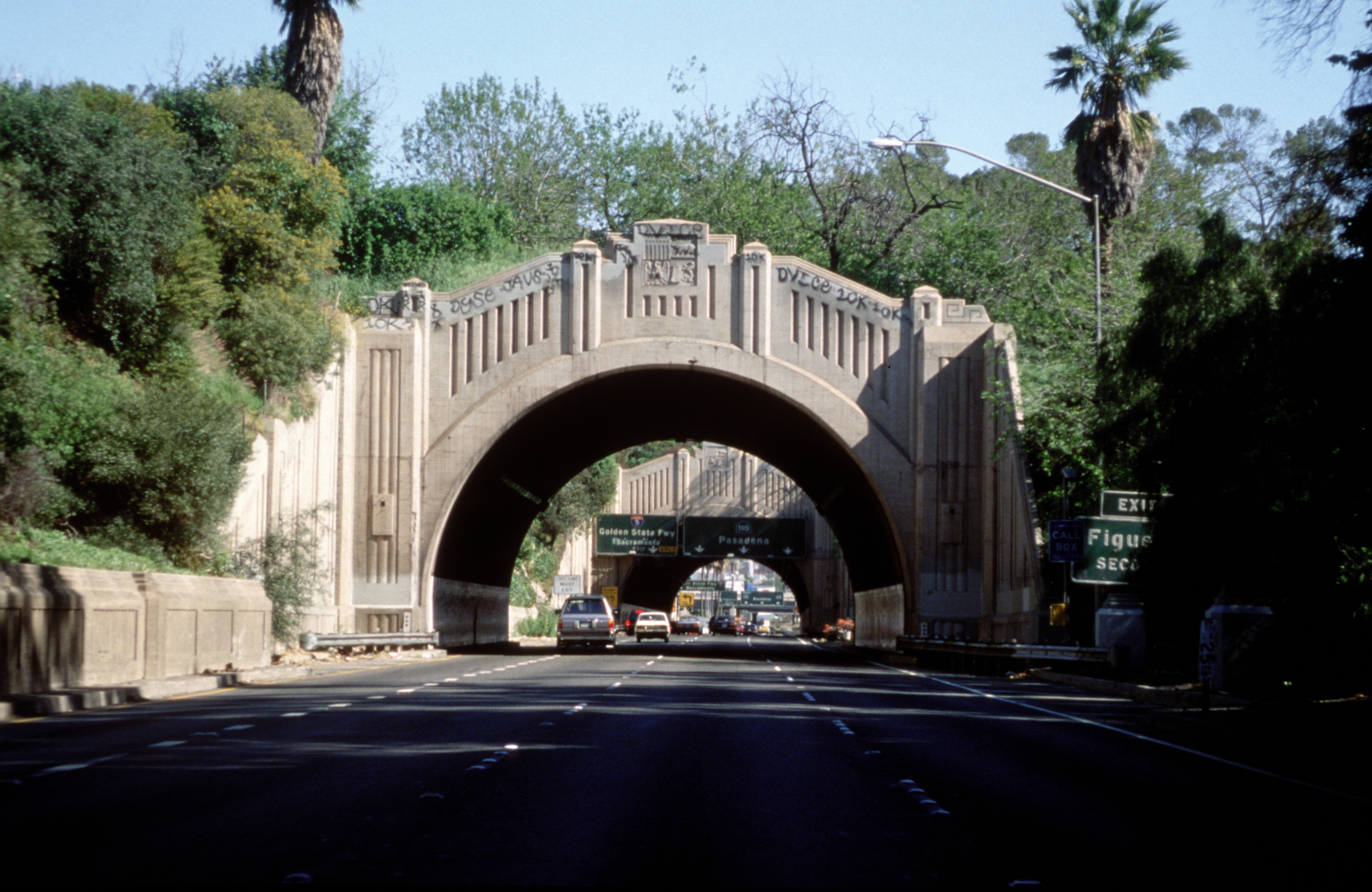
- Looking northeast through the third and fourth tunnels

Overview
- Location: Elysian Park, Los Angeles
- Coordinates: 34°04′23″N 118°14′02″W
- Route: Northbound lanes of SR 110
- Start: Northeast of Stadium Way
- End: Southwest of I-5

Operation
- Opened: 1931
- Operator: Caltrans

Technical
- Length: 755, 461, 130, and 405 ft (230, 141, 40, and 123 m, respectively)
- Tunnel clearance: 28.3 ft (8.6 m)
- Width: 46.5 ft (14.2 m)

The Figueroa Street Tunnels are a set of four four-lane tunnels that carry northbound traffic on State Route 110 (the Arroyo Seco Parkway) through Elysian Park in Los Angeles, California, United States. From south to north, the four tunnels measure 755, 461, 130, and 405 feet (230, 141, 40, and 123 m) in length, 46.5 feet (14 m) in width, and 28.3 ft (8.6 m) in height.

The north three tunnels opened in 1931 as a bypass to a section of North Broadway; the southernmost (and longest) opened in 1935, connecting to Figueroa Street downtown. In 1943, the Figueroa Street Viaduct was built to the north of the tunnels. This dedicated the tunnels to 4 lanes of eastward traffic, and the viaduct to 4 lanes of westward traffic. Several connections have been added to the street, most notably in 1940 to the Arroyo Seco Parkway and in 1953 to the Four Level Interchange.

The tunnels were designed by engineer Merrill Butler, who was responsible for many iconic Los Angeles River bridges - notably the Sixth Street Viaduct and the Glendale-Hyperion Bridge. The tunnels featured Art Deco patterns, ornamental street lamps, reflective tiling (similar to the 2nd Street Tunnel), and above all eight openings, a stylized Seal of Los Angeles.

Traffic through the tunnels is heavy at almost all times of day. At the north end of the tunnels is an interchange with Interstate 5 (Golden State Freeway), in which the leftmost lane makes a hard turn onto the offramp. There are also sharp exit and entrance ramps, on the right lane, at Solano Avenue after the first tunnel. Since the tunnels' incorporation into Arroyo Seco Parkway (now SR 110), Figueroa Street has been discontinuous. It merges into SR 110 at Alpine Street in Chinatown, south of the tunnels, and splits in Highland Park, north of the Figueroa Street Viaduct over the Los Angeles River.

== History ==
Circa 1911, traffic between Los Angeles and Pasadena crossed the Los Angeles River on the congested North Broadway Bridge, the largest concrete bridge in California at the time. The Dayton Avenue Bridge provided another crossing to the north, but the hills of Elysian Park prevented it from being connected to downtown. The north three tunnels opened by November 1, 1931, connecting to North Broadway on the south via Solano Avenue and Riverside Drive on the north. Riverside Drive was an earlier high-speed road along the Los Angeles River to Burbank, and also intersected the Dayton Avenue Bridge, which led to Dayton Avenue (now part of Figueroa Street) towards Pasadena. From opening, the tunnels carried two lanes in each direction, with a 5-foot (1.5 m) sidewalk on the side.

The fourth tunnel opened on August 4, 1936, continuing the route south and southwest to Figueroa Street at Alpine Street. (Bridges over Figueroa Street on Temple Street and First Street were built in 1940, further improving that entrance to downtown.) The Figueroa Street Viaduct opened in 1937, providing a wider and direct Los Angeles River crossing than the Dayton Avenue Bridge. After passing over the river and San Fernando Road, it tied into Dayton Avenue (Figueroa Street) south of Avenue 26. The Arroyo Seco Parkway opened in late 1940 as a freeway from the Viaduct to Pasadena. However, the six-lane parkway narrowed to four lanes at the viaduct and through the tunnels, and had a number of at-grade intersections on its way downtown.

The Southerly Extension of the Arroyo Seco Parkway supplemented the Figueroa Street Viaduct and Tunnels with a new southbound roadway to the west, and converted Figueroa Street to freeway standards south to Adobe Street. The new Los Angeles River Bridge left the existing road north of the original viaduct terminus at Figueroa Street, and crossed over the ramp to Figueroa Street, the Los Angeles River, and the northbound exit to Riverside Drive (now a ramp to Interstate 5 north, although Riverside Drive is still accessible from this ramp). Through Elysian Park, it was built higher than the tunnels, with open-cuts through the ridges through which the older tunnels were built, and viaducts over the valleys between the ridges. South of the southernmost tunnel, the older road was widened and upgraded to freeway standards south to Adobe Street. This new road opened December 30, 1943. A further extension was completed on September 22, 1953 to the Four Level Interchange with U.S. Route 101 (Santa Ana Freeway and Hollywood Freeway).

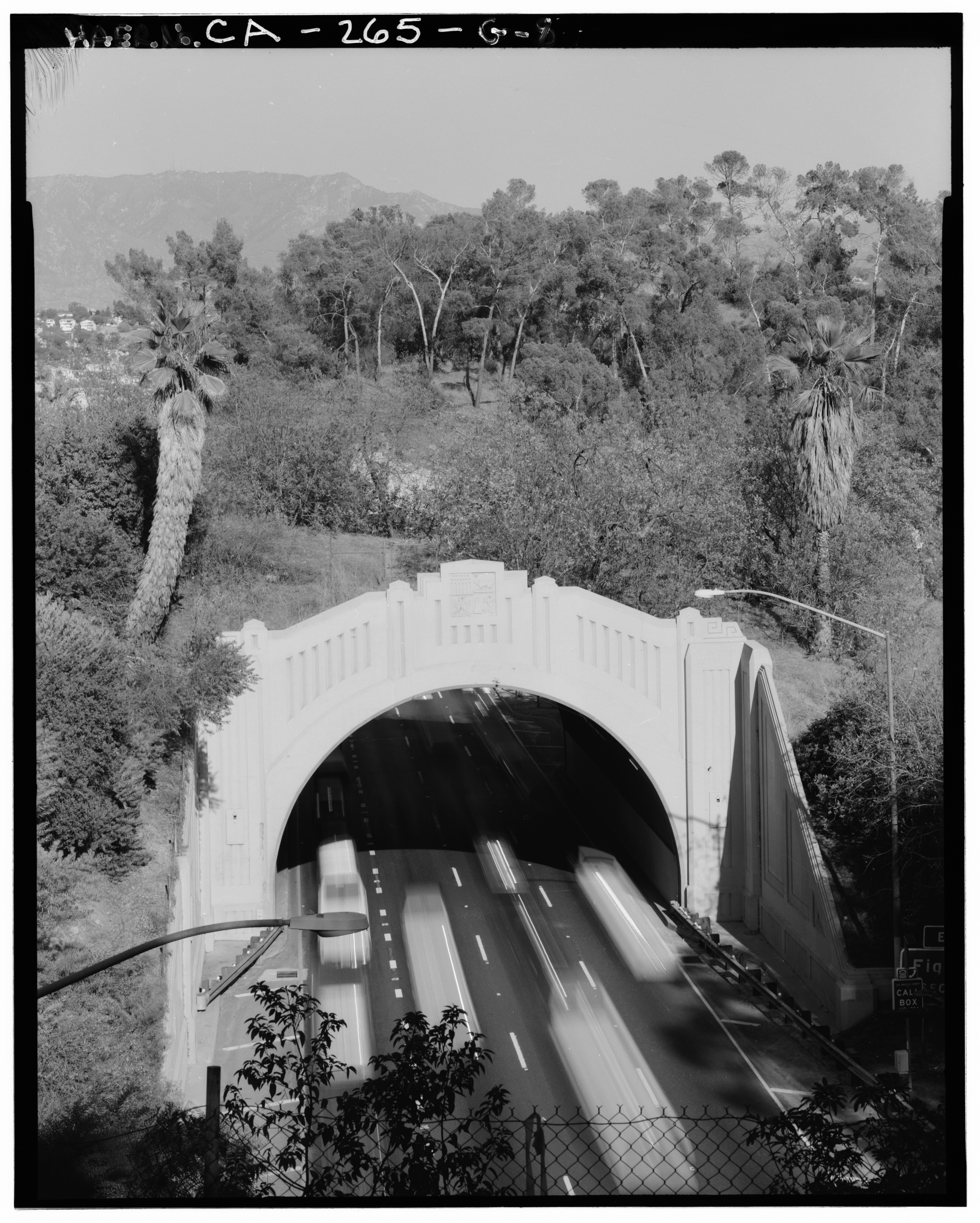
Tunnel, date unknown

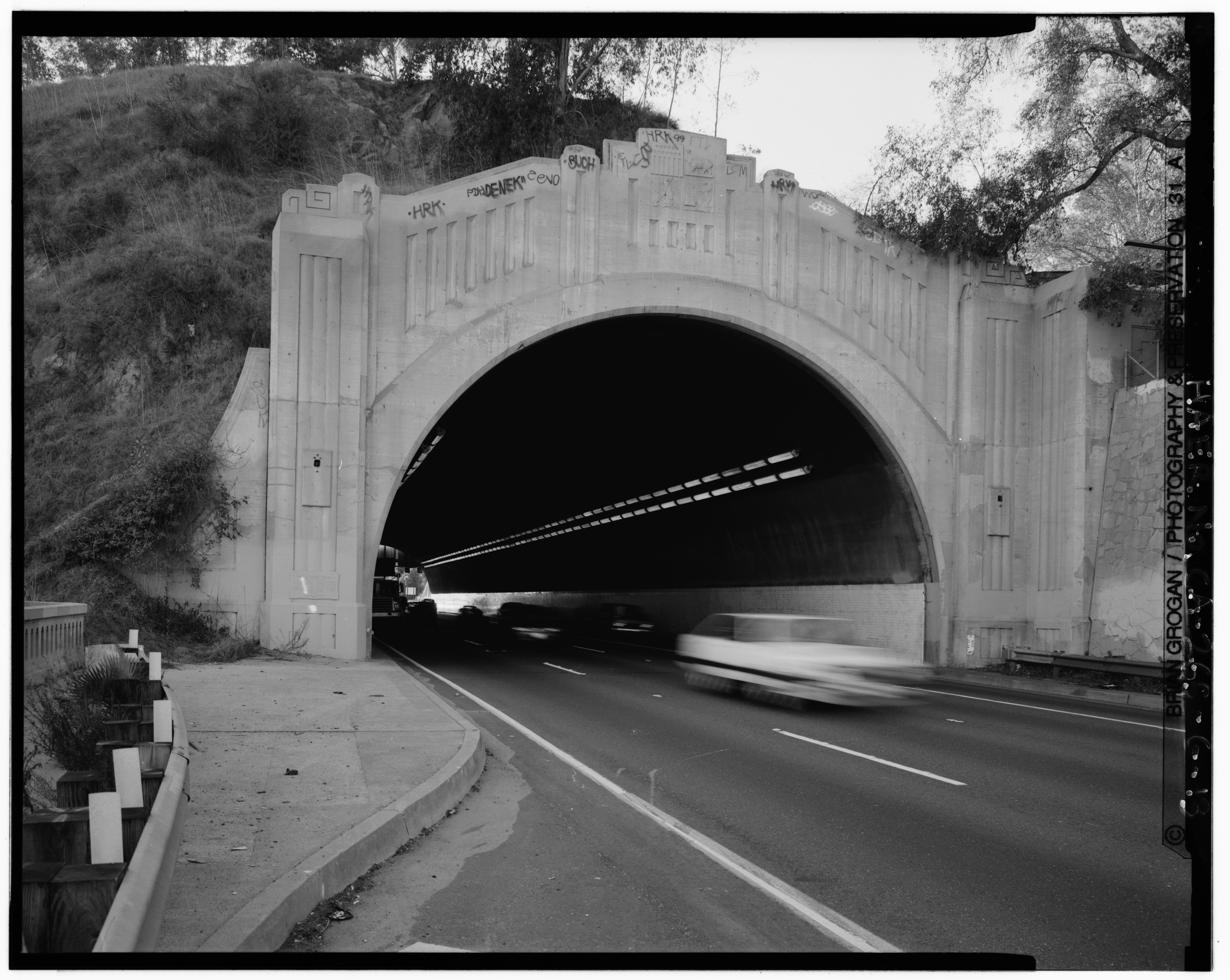
Tunnel No.1

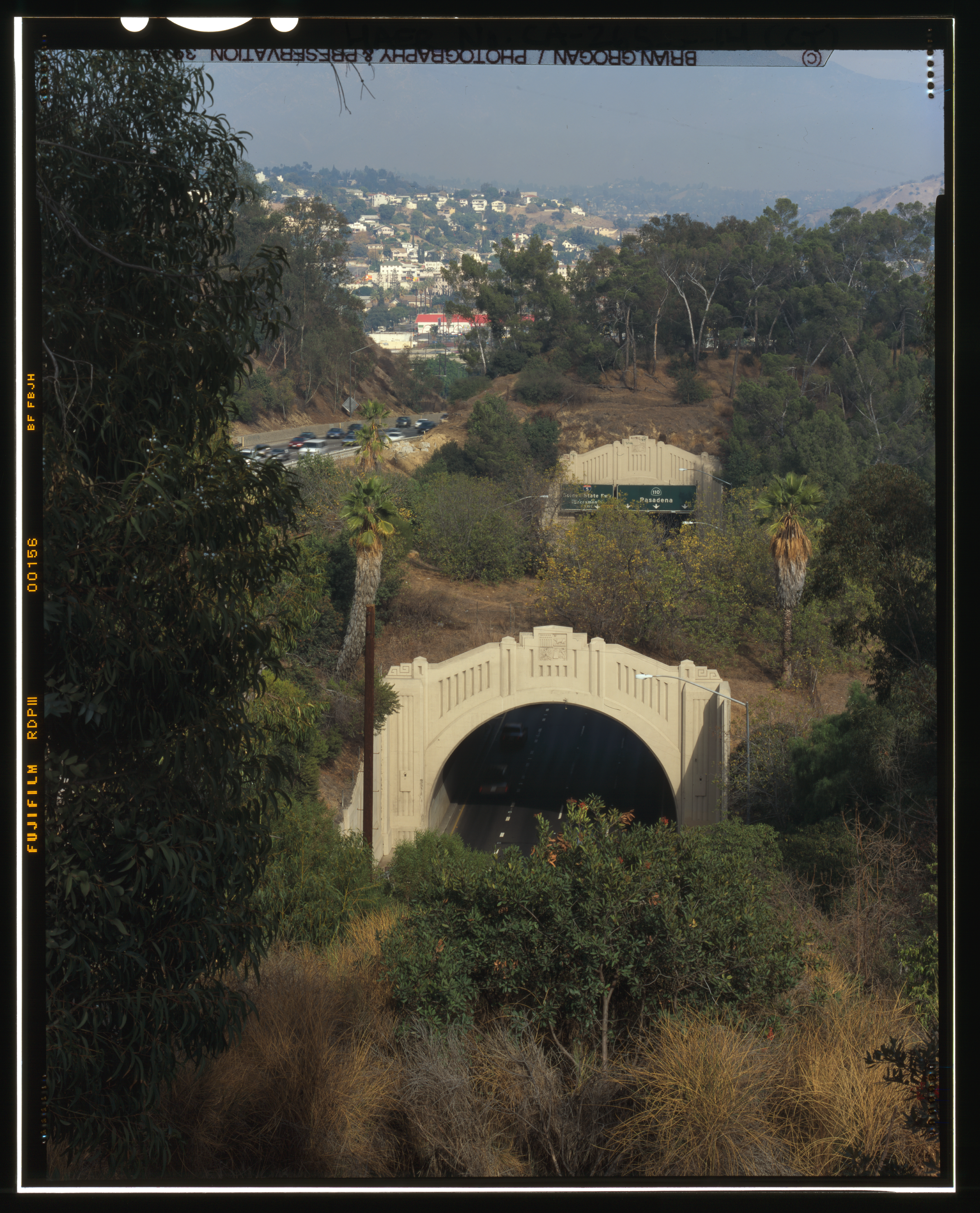
Tunnel No.2, south portal

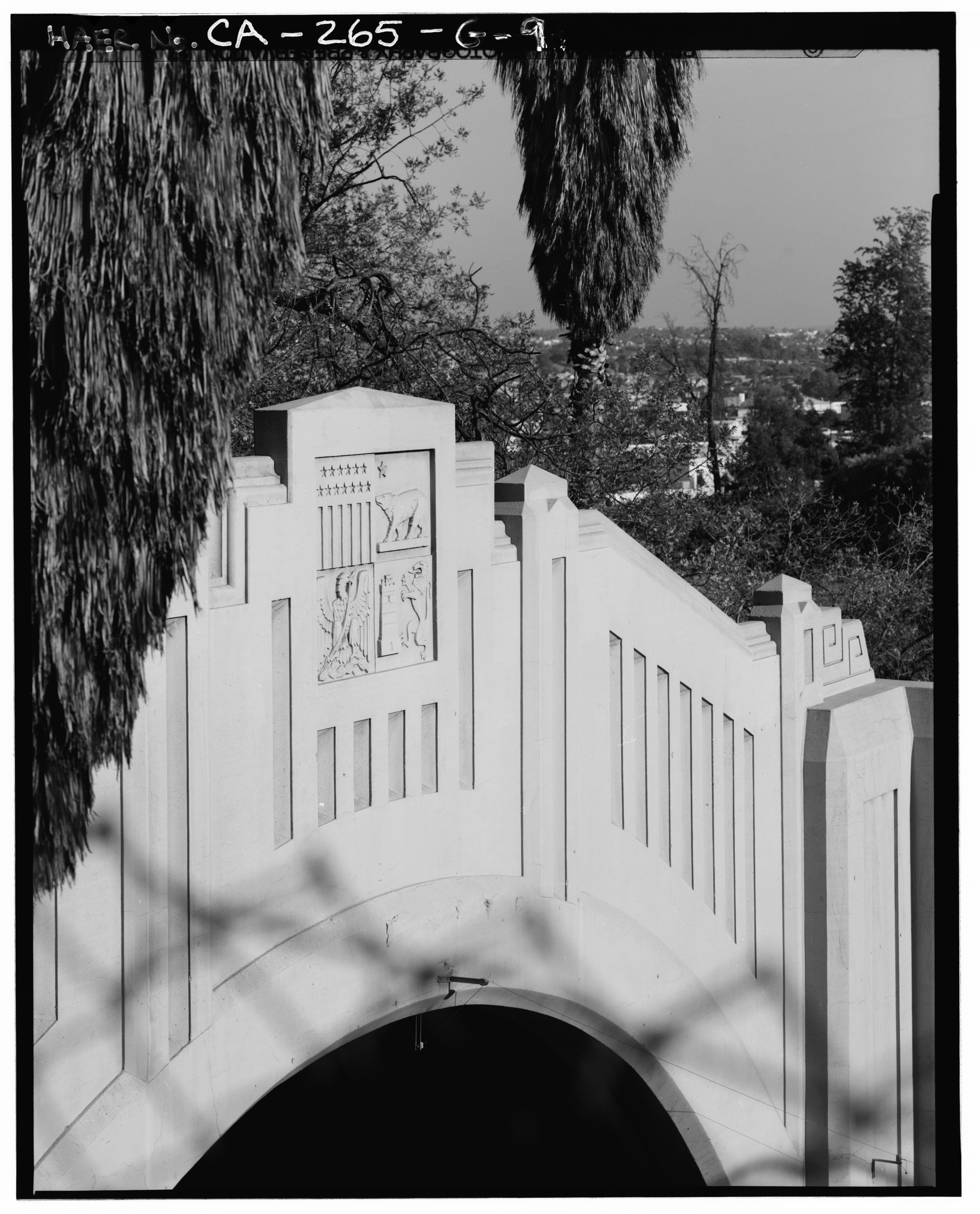
Detail view of design element on Tunnel No.2

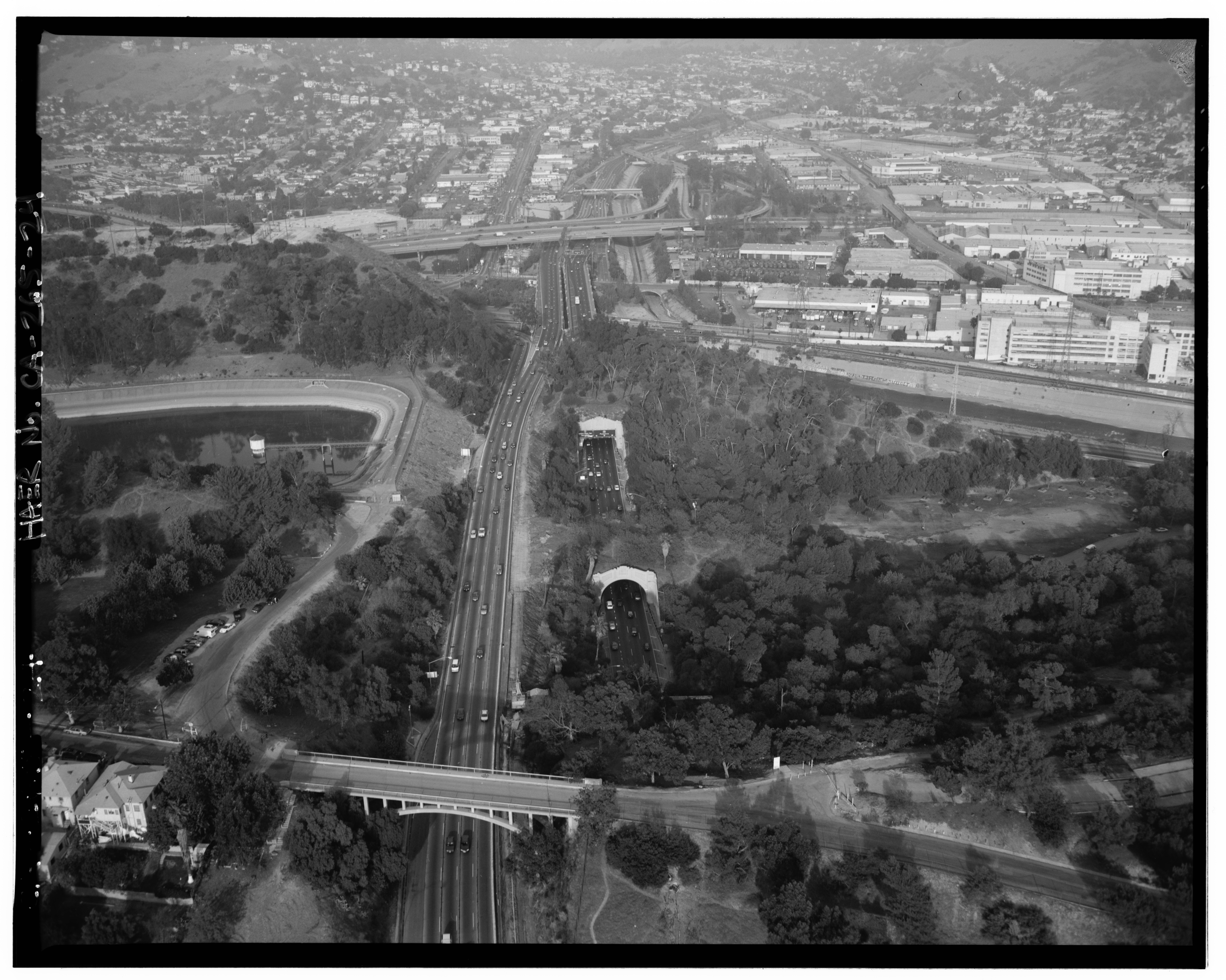
Aerial view

The tunnels (and Figueroa Street north of them) were part of pre-1964 Legislative Route 165, defined in 1933. By 1942, U.S. Route 6, U.S. Route 66, U.S. Route 99 and State Route 11 were signed through them. US 66 continued along the Arroyo Seco Parkway, while US 6 and US 99 turned northwest on San Fernando Road via Figueroa Street and Avenue 26, and SR 11 exited at Figueroa Street to run to Pasadena with U.S. Route 66 Alternate. US 99 moved to the new Golden State Freeway, bypassing the tunnels with Interstate 5, when it opened in 1962. US 6 and US 66 were removed from the Los Angeles area in the 1964 renumbering, leaving only SR 11 through the tunnels (and on the Parkway after 1964). SR 11 became State Route 110 in 1981, when the Harbor Freeway section of it became Interstate 110.

In April, 2008, retrofitting of the tunnel lighting was completed, replacing the tandem fluorescent lighting arrangement in place since 1964, with a more "efficient" lighting array.

== In popular culture ==
Famously featured in the 1982 Ridley Scott film Blade Runner, Harrison Ford drives through the tunnel while listening to the recording of an attempted murder.

Featured in the 1971 film Duel, in the opening credits sequence.

Seen in the end credits of the 1995 PlayStation video game Twisted Metal

In the 2005 film Rumor Has It…, three of the characters hold their breaths while driving through the tunnels.

At Disney's Hollywood Studios at Walt Disney World, a replica of the tunnel is used as the gateway from the Grand Avenue area to Star Wars: Galaxy's Edge.

== See also ==
- List of tunnels documented by the Historic American Engineering Record in California
