= Golden Mall =

Mall in Burbank, California, United States (1967–1989)

Coordinates: 34.1808°N 118.3109°W

The Golden Mall was a pedestrianized mall in downtown Burbank, California from 1967 to 1989. It consisted of San Fernando Boulevard from Tujunga Avenue to San Jose Street, immediately south of the present Burbank Town Center.

== Origins ==
The Golden Mall was built at a cost of $915,000 and opened in November 1967.

== Success ==
During the mid-1970s one source stated that the mall was still considered an important retail hub in Burbank. However, another source stated that already by 1970, only three years after opening, new businesses stopped coming in to the mall, and customers starting coming less and less. The reasons given for lower customer traffic were firstly, because of the difficulty of parking away from the stores (instead of in front as previously), and secondly, that the store windows were not visible from any major street, so people driving by were not inspired to stop and shop there.

== Attempts at revitalization as a pedestrian mall ==
By the late 1980s, the mall had deteriorated. Overgrown landscaping and deteriorating vegetation were a haven for vagrants, according to the Los Angeles Times. Unkempt storefronts and vacant stores were also putting off customers. Revitalization efforts focused on an empty 40-acre (16 ha) parcel adjacent to Golden Mall, now the site of the Burbank Town Center mall. Ernest Hahn didn't follow through on plans to build a $140 million "Towncenter" there - plans that included transforming Golden Mall into a themed " village street" that would feed into the new development. In April 1988 Walt Disney Co. abandoned plans to build a $611 million shopping and entertainment center there.

== Reintroduction of vehicle traffic ==
The city decided in the end to revitalize the area by reintroducing automobile traffic to the street. A multicinema opened in the late 1980s as well, helping bring traffic to the mall.

The plan to return vehicular traffic to the mall was proposed in 1985. 1987, the block from Tujunga to Olive were opened to vehicles. In June 1988, the city council studied the opening of the remaining three blocks from Magnolia to Tujunga.

Burbank Town Center finally opened at the north end of the former Golden Mall, built by European mall developer Haagen Co, in 1991, with IKEA moving in earlier in 1990.

Today this stretch of San Fernando Road forms part of the "Burbank Village" district.
