= Burbank Town Center =

Shopping complex in Southern California

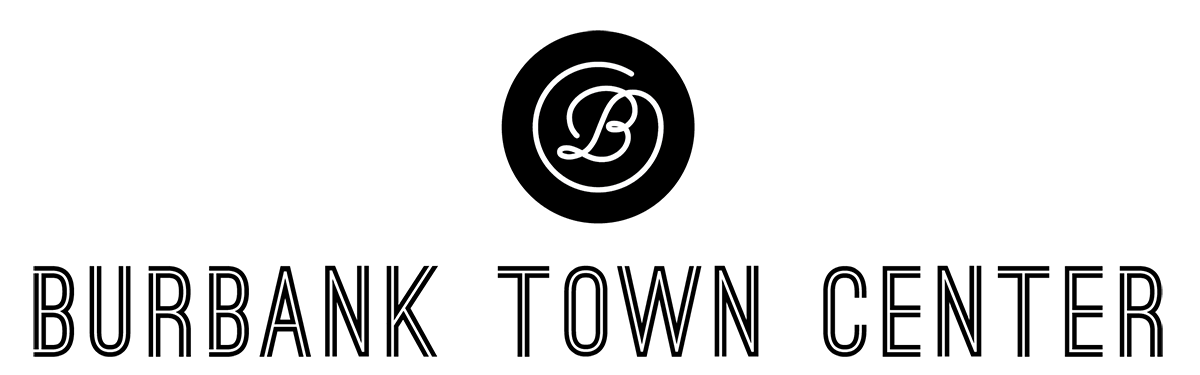

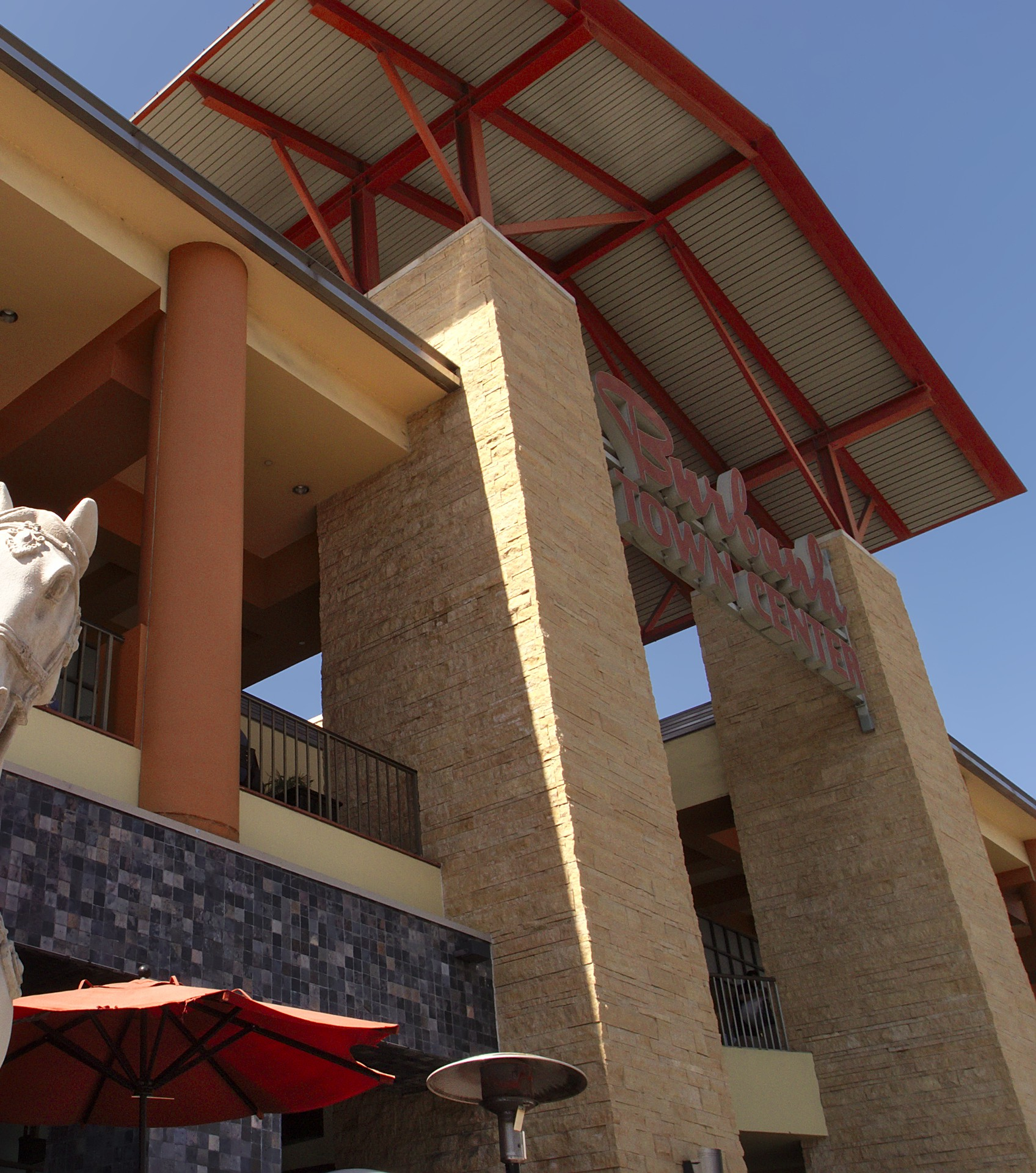
- Old entrance to Burbank Town Center on East Magnolia Boulevard
- Location: Burbank, California, U.S.
- Coordinates: 34.1837°N 118.3126°W
- Address: 201 East Magnolia Boulevard
- Opened: August 21, 1991; 35 years ago
- Developer: Alexander Haagen
- Manager: Onni Group
- Owner: Onni Group
- Num. of stores: 100+
- Num. of anchor tenants: 3
- Floor area: 1,200,000 square feet (110,000 m^{2})
- Floors: 3 (2 in Burlington)
- Website: burbanktowncenter.com

Burbank Town Center (formerly Media City Center) is a large shopping mall complex that opened in August 1991 in Burbank, California, United States. The three-level indoor mall is anchored by Macy's, Burlington, and ROUND1 Bowling & Amusement, with an open air shopping plaza anchored by Office Depot.

== History ==
The Golden Mall was a pedestrianized mall in downtown Burbank from 1967 to 1989. It consisted of San Fernando Boulevard from Tujunga Avenue to Magnolia Boulevard. At the north end of the Golden Mall was a vacant 40-acre parcel (16 ha). Plans to revitalize Golden Mall during the 1970s and 1980s hinged on several plans to develop the 40-acre parcel (16 ha). These plans started emerging as early as 1979, with developer Ernst Hahn planning a 5-anchor downtown mall, which, following financial difficulties, was scaled back to "Burbank Towncenter", which collapsed in 1987 following the withdrawal of anchor Robinsons. The Walt Disney Company was involved with plans for a large-scale shopping center on the site briefly, until 1988, when plans were dropped due to rising costs. Plans were handed off by the city to European mall developer Haagen Co the following year.

IKEA was the first store to open on the site, in late 1990. Drawing 146,000 people in its first six days of business, it was the first of four new IKEA stores in the area. The mall had, at this time, begun construction, despite Bullock's being the only announced anchor. Four office buildings and a hotel, possibly Sheraton, were also announced at this time. A $2 million, 12,500 sq ft (1,160 m^{2}) branch of the Natural History Museum of Los Angeles County was announced to be built at the property in February 1991, their first satellite location, with a planned opening of Summer 1992. A Buffums was also planned for the mall, before the chain's demise in early 1991.

The mall opened its doors for a "sneak preview" on August 21, 1991, with 20 of a planned 130 stores open along with anchors Sears and Mervyn's, with Bullock's slated to open in August 1992, along with the rest of "Phase 1" of the property, including a mall food court and movie theater, a 300-room hotel, 1 million sq ft (93,000 m^{2}) of office space, and the Los Angeles County museum. The mall had reached 60% occupancy by November 1991, including the opening of a 4-screen AMC Theatres. By June 1992, the opening of the satellite museum location had been pushed back into 1993. In early August 1992, billboards reading "There's Only One Johnny Carson" and "There's Only One Jimmy Dean", among others, went up around Burbank and the surrounding area, followed with a billboard reading "There's Only One Burbank Media City Center". Bullock's opened on September 2, 1992, with a grand opening celebration featuring a parade and appearances by actors from The New WKRP in Cincinnati and The Young and the Restless. Macy's came to the mall in 1996, with their conversion of all Bullock's stores to the Macy's name that year.

The mall was sold to Crown Realty in March 2003 for $110 million, with extensive remodeling plans announced in August that year. Designed by the Dallas architecture firm Omniplan, it included heavy use of "natural materials such as stone". A name change was also discussed at this time, in order to mitigate what the owners described as a perception problem, due to slumping sales in the mall. The mall was renamed to its current name, Burbank Town Center, in late 2004. Mervyn's closed in 2008, with the closure of the rest of the chain.

Burlington Coat Factory opened in 2010, in the former Mervyns space. Announced at the same time was Ashley HomeStore, which filled an outlying anchor space vacated by Circuit City in 2008. IKEA closed on February 4, 2017, shortly before the opening of a larger standalone IKEA store approximately a mile away on February 8. A $350 million plan to redevelop the former IKEA into smaller retail spaces, hotel rooms, and apartments was announced in January 2018, alongside $60 million of renovations to the mall itself.

On September 23, 2022, Sears announced the closure of the Burbank Town Center location, the last original anchor from the mall's opening day. The store closed on December 18, 2022, but reopened in October 2023 with only two of the three floors in use. On July 23, 2025 it was announced that Sears would close again on August 31.

== In popular culture ==
With The Burbank Studios (formerly NBC Studios), Warner Bros. Studios, the Warner Bros. Ranch, and Walt Disney Studios in Burbank, the mall regularly appears on film and television. In 2020, the former IKEA building was used for the filming of a Netflix game show called Floor is Lava.
