= Four Level Interchange =

Stack interchange in Los Angeles

- Bill Keene Memorial Interchange
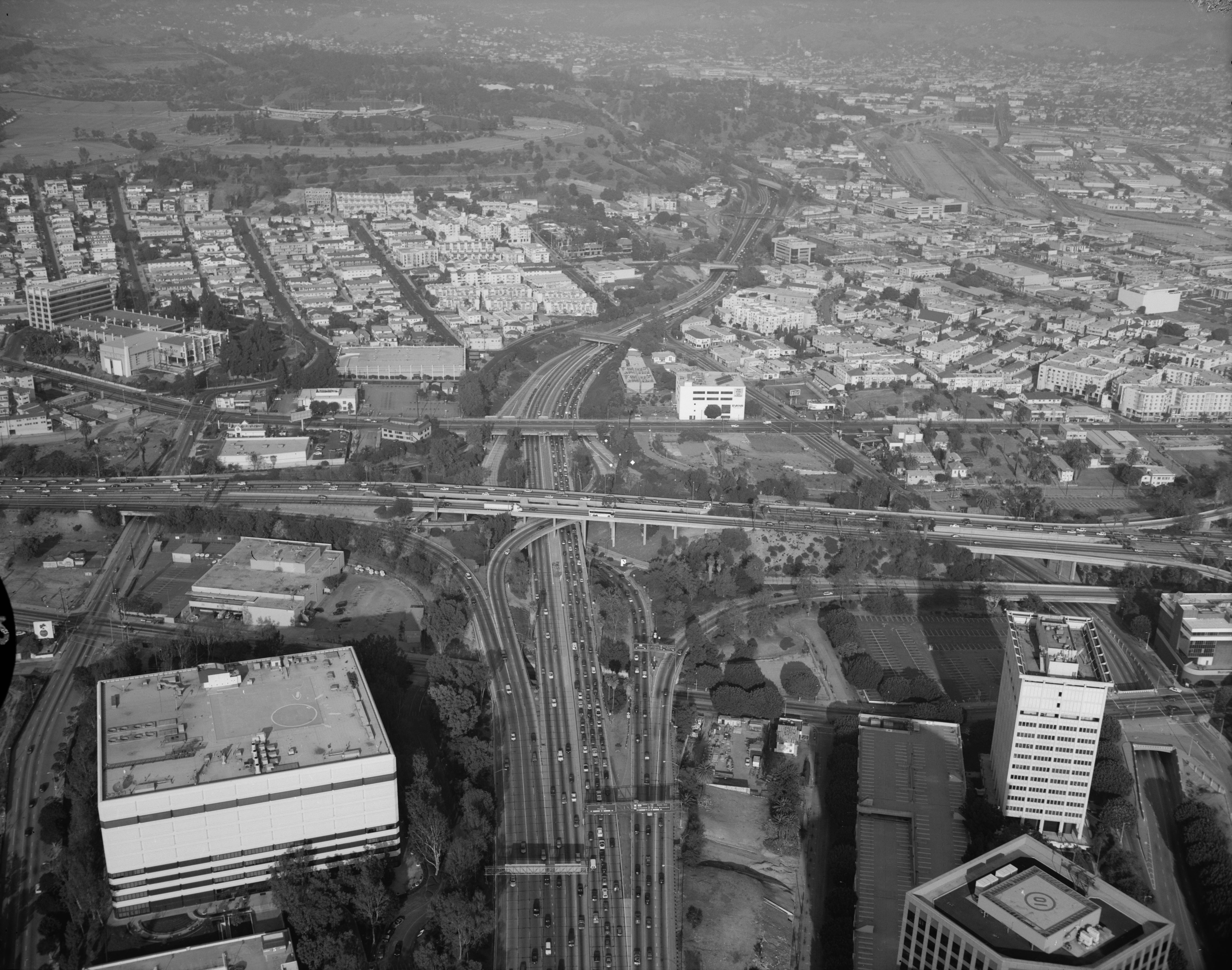
- Four Level Interchange of Arroyo Seco Parkway, Harbor Freeway, Santa Ana Freeway and Hollywood Freeway, looking northeast in January 1999
- Interactive map of Four Level Interchange

Location
- Los Angeles, California
- Coordinates: 34°3′45″N 118°14′55″W
- Roads at junction: SR 110 (Arroyo Seco Parkway / Harbor Freeway); US 101 (Hollywood Freeway / Santa Ana Freeway)

Construction
- Type: Four-level stack interchange
- Constructed: 1949
- Opened: 1953
- Maintained by: California Department of Transportation

The Four Level Interchange (officially the Bill Keene Memorial Interchange) is the first stack interchange in the world. Completed in 1949 and fully opened in 1953 at the northern edge of Downtown Los Angeles, California, United States, it connects U.S. Route 101 (Hollywood Freeway and Santa Ana Freeway) to State Route 110 (Harbor Freeway and Arroyo Seco Parkway). In 2006, the interchange was officially renamed in the memory of Los Angeles traffic and weather reporter Bill Keene.

== Description ==
The highway is a stack interchange that connects U.S. Route 101 to State Route 110. All movements are possible in this interchange between US 101, which crosses over SR 110, but not necessarily with surrounding roads, like Sunset Boulevard, which crosses SR 110 just northeast of the interchange. The interchange is located at Exit 3 of US 101 and Exit 24A of SR 110.

The four freeway segments ("paths" of travel) from the Four Level Interchange are:

- US 101 north (Hollywood Freeway) – Ventura
- US 101 south (Santa Ana Freeway) to I-5 south / I-10 east / SR 60 east
- SR 110 north (Arroyo Seco Parkway) – Pasadena
- SR 110 south (Harbor Freeway) to I-110 south – San Pedro

== History ==
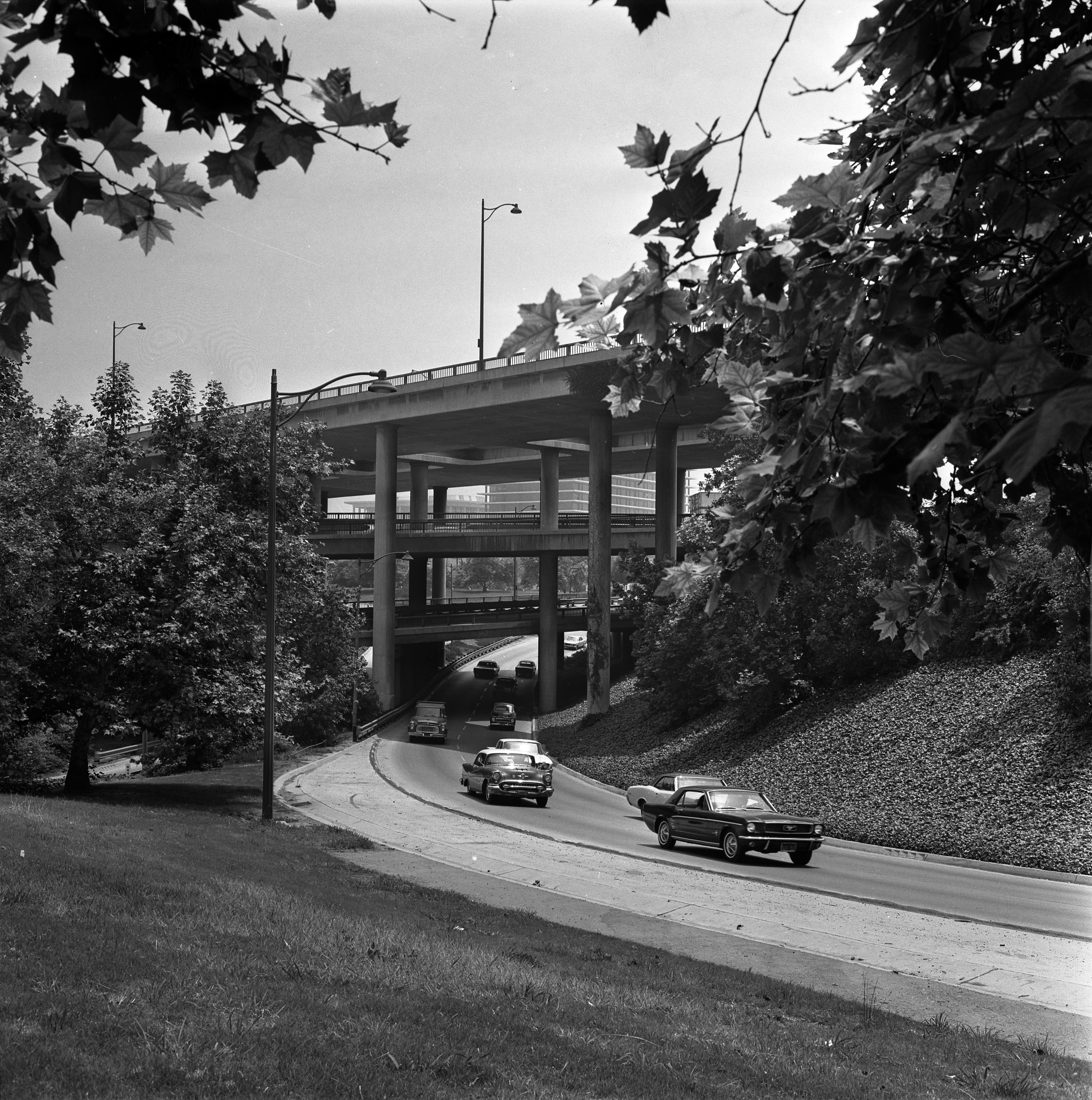
Four Level Interchange, 1966

While the highway oriented east–west at this intersection has consistently been numbered US 101, the numerical designation of the road oriented north–south at this interchange has changed over the years. Originally designated U.S. Route 66 and U.S. Route 6 and later signed as State Route 11, all of these designations were eventually removed from the intersection and replaced with the current designation of Route 110.

The four-level reinforced concrete structure was designed by a team of engineers and built by the James I. Barnes Construction Company. Although it was finished in 1949, it was not put into full use until the freeways it served were completed and opened on 22 September 1953.

In July 2006, the freeway interchange was officially named in honor of Bill Keene, former KNX and KNXT traffic and weather reporter, although the new name is rarely used. Keene referred to the interchange as "The Stacks" and the "4-H Interchange". During the 1960s, Dick Whittinghill on radio station KMPC sometimes called it the Four Letter Interchange.

The interchange was constructed as a stack interchange because surrounding buildings and terrain made construction of a cloverleaf interchange impractical. The construction of the interchange displaced over 4,000 people from their homes and cost $5.5 million ($52 million in 2024) – making it the most expensive half-mile of highway ever built at the time.

The mainline traffic of US 101 is at the top of the interchange, above the ramps, a rarity in stack interchanges. Other examples of similar configurations would later be constructed, including on the M25 interchange with M23 passing above the ramps (south of London), the junction of I-695 and I-70 in Baltimore, and the Interstate 805–Interstate 8 interchange in San Diego.

Its distinctive architecture has long made it a symbol of Los Angeles' post–World War II development, and it appears on numerous postcards from the 1950s and 1960s.

== See also ==
- Dosan Ahn Chang Ho Memorial Interchange, the counterpart at the southern edge of Downtown Los Angeles
- List of bridges documented by the Historic American Engineering Record in California
