= San Fernando Road =

Major street in the City and County Los Angeles

Coordinates: 34°13′40″N 118°22′53″W

- Interactive map of San Fernando Road
- Length: 24 miles
- South end: Avenue 20 in Los Angeles
- Major junctions: SR 2 in Glassell Park; SR 134 near Glendale; SR 118 near San Fernando
- North end: Sierra Highway near Sylmar

San Fernando Road is a major street in the City of Los Angeles and Los Angeles County. Within the Burbank city limits it is signed as San Fernando Boulevard, and north of Newhall Pass it is signed as The Old Road. It was previously designated as Business Loop 5 in the 1970s.

== Route ==
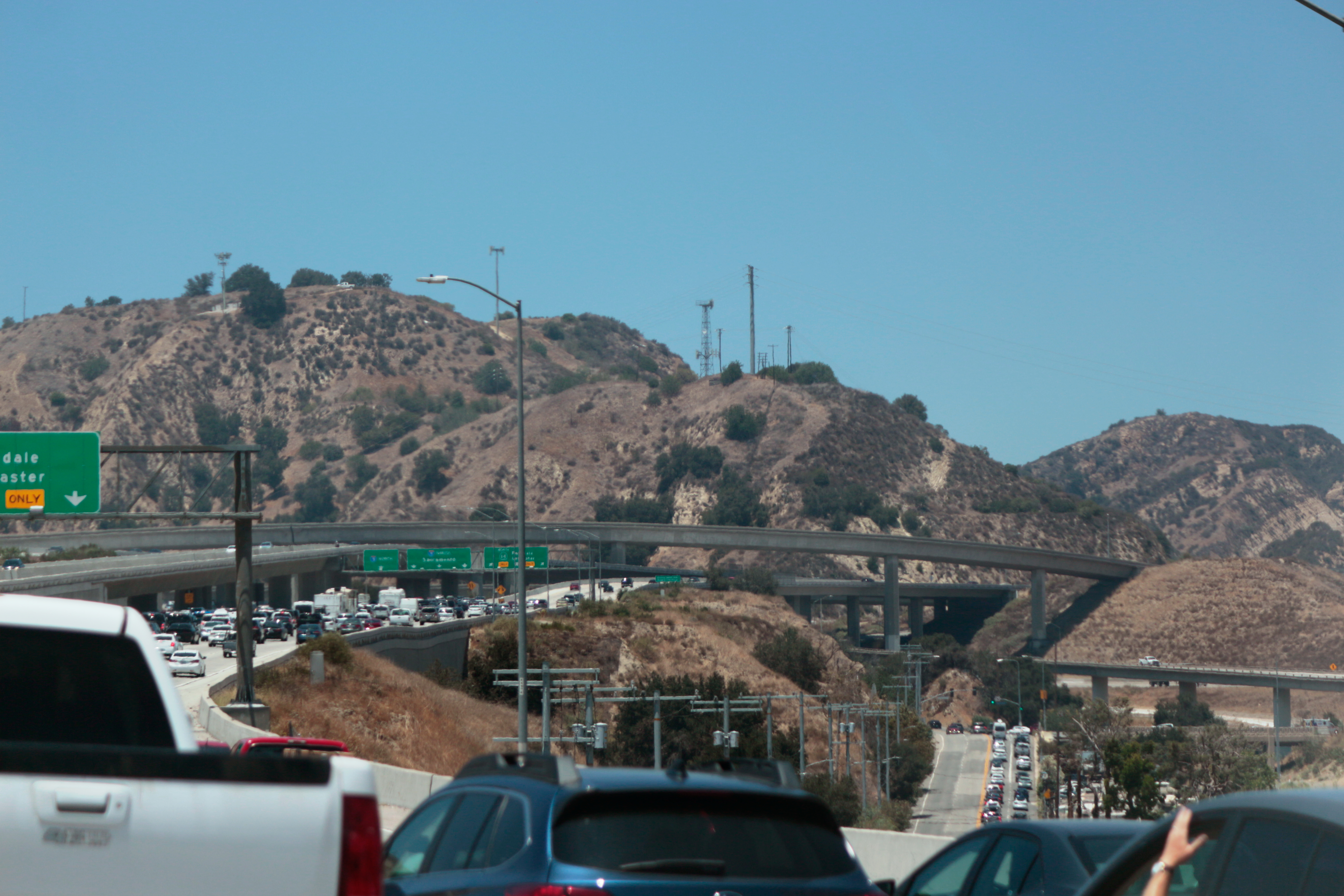
The northern terminus of San Fernando Road signage can be seen to the right of (and below) the Newhall Pass interchange in this photo looking north from Interstate 5

San Fernando Road starts at its intersection with Sierra Highway in the Sylmar neighborhood of Los Angeles. It passes through the city of San Fernando before re-entering the city of Los Angeles at the intersection with the Ronald Reagan Freeway (SR 118) in the neighborhood of Pacoima, where it parallels Interstate 5. Like Laurel Canyon Boulevard to the west in Sun Valley, it passes through rock quarries and the Hansen Dam Recreation Area, one of the last remaining open spaces in the San Fernando Valley.

North of Sierra Highway, San Fernando Road becomes The Old Road. The Old Road runs parallel to Interstate 5 and serves the Stevenson Ranch, Valencia, and Castaic neighborhoods in the western Santa Clarita Valley. It only very briefly passes through the Santa Clarita city limits, as it is west of I-5 for nearly its entire length.

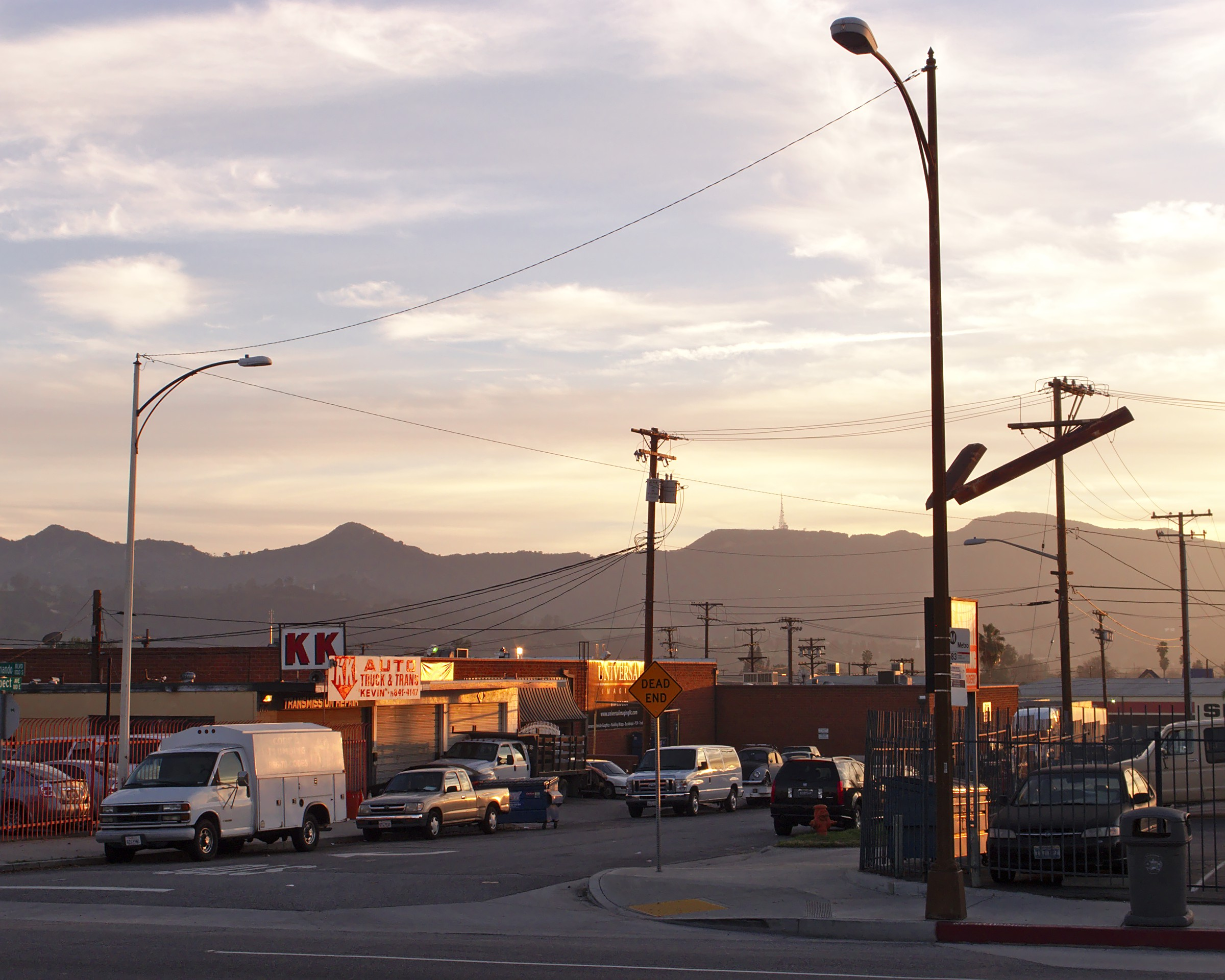
Looking south across San Fernando Road towards Griffith Park from Burbank

The portion between Sun Valley and the city of Burbank is mostly industrial, with heavy truck traffic through this area. San Fernando Road passes next to Bob Hope Airport and through downtown Burbank. Upon entering the Burbank city limits, it is signed as San Fernando Boulevard. At the intersection with Lincoln Street, there is an interruption in the route due to the reconstruction of the interchange with Interstate 5, with no direct link to the portion of San Fernando Boulevard that runs east of the freeway. At the intersection with Cypress Avenue in the Media City Center, there is another brief interruption in the route. 1st Street and Magnolia Boulevard connect both portions of San Fernando Boulevard. The road becomes San Fernando Road again once it enters the city of Glendale, where it serves as a major street for western and southern Glendale.

From the intersection with the Ventura Freeway (SR 134) to its southern terminus, the street closely follows the Los Angeles River through the Atwater Village, Glassell Park, and Cypress Park neighborhoods. North of Figueroa Street, San Fernando Road splits with Avenue 26, and passes under the Arroyo Seco Parkway at the mouth of the Arroyo Seco. San Fernando Road ends at the Pasadena Avenue intersection, where it becomes Avenue 20, which ends 5 blocks later at North Main Street, near Downtown Los Angeles.

== History ==
Prior to the construction of Interstate 5, San Fernando Road was old U.S. Route 99 and U.S. Route 6. With the completion of the Golden State Freeway, it was re-signed as State Route 163 in the 1960s and Business Interstate 5 in the 1970s.

Today, San Fernando Road is used as an alternative to Interstate 5 between Lincoln Heights and the Newhall Pass, due to the relatively few traffic signals on the route.

== Local Transportation ==
Metro Local lines 93, 94, 224, and 294 run along San Fernando Road, as well as Glendale Transit lines 7 and 12.

== Other uses ==
There was another San Fernando Road entirely within the city of Santa Clarita starting only 2 1/2 miles north of the northern end of the original San Fernando Road. San Fernando Road in Santa Clarita has now been renamed and split into 3 different streets (from south to north): Newhall Avenue, Main Street, and Railroad Avenue. The route formerly carried the easternmost segment of SR 126.

San Fernando Road should also not be confused with the nearby San Fernando Mission Boulevard. The two roads intersect in the City of San Fernando about a mile from the San Fernando Mission.

The former Southern Pacific Railroad, which now carries the Antelope Valley Line of the Metrolink rail system, follows both portions of San Fernando Road for their entire routes.
