= List of crossings of the Los Angeles River =

This is a list of crossings of the Los Angeles River. Crossings are listed from south to north; that is, going upstream from the mouth of the river channel in Long Beach.

== List ==
Photo	Crossing	City (neighborhood)	Constructed	Coordinates
	Queensway Twin Bridges carrying Queens Way	Long Beach	1969	
	West Ocean Boulevard	Long Beach	1959	
	Service Bridge	Long Beach		
	Shoreline Drive West (former Interstate 710)	Long Beach	1963	
	West Anaheim Street	Long Beach	1954	
	SR 1 (West Pacific Coast Highway)	Long Beach	1957	
	Service Bridge	Long Beach		
	West Willow Street	Long Beach	1946	
	Service Bridge	Long Beach		
	Wardlow Road	Long Beach	1950	
	I-405 (San Diego Freeway), includes 2 separate freeway interchange ramp crossings	Long Beach	1963	
	Railroad: Metro A Line (2 Tracks)	Long Beach	1987	
	Railroad: Union Pacific (1 Track)	Long Beach		
	West Del Amo Boulevard	Long Beach	1958	
	Long Beach Boulevard	Long Beach	1946	
	Artesia Boulevard	Long Beach	1949	
	SR 91 (Artesia Freeway), includes 5 separate freeway interchange ramp crossings	Long Beach	1971	
	South Atlantic Avenue	Long Beach and Compton	1937	
	Alondra Boulevard	Paramount and Compton	1958	
	East Compton/Somerset Boulevard	Paramount and Compton	1976	
	Rosecrans Avenue	Paramount and Compton	1951	
	Service Bridge	Paramount and Compton		
	I-105 (Glenn Anderson Freeway), includes the Metro C Line (2 Tracks in Freeway median), plus 4 separate freeway interchange ramp crossings	Paramount and Lynwood	1990	
	East Imperial Highway	South Gate and Lynwood	1951	
	I-710 (Long Beach Freeway)	South Gate	1955	
	Railroad: Union Pacific (1 Track)	South Gate		
	Firestone Boulevard	South Gate	1950	
	Railroad: Union Pacific (1 Track)	Bell Gardens and Cudahy		
	Clara Street	Bell Gardens and Cudahy	1939	
	Florence Avenue	Bell Gardens and Bell	1948	
	Gage Avenue	Bell Gardens and Bell	1940	
	Railroad: Union Pacific (1 Track)	Bell Gardens and Bell		
	East Slauson Avenue	Commerce, Bell, and Maywood	1942	
	South Atlantic Boulevard	Vernon	1931	
	Railroad: Los Angeles Junction/BNSF (1 Track)	Vernon		
	Railroad: Union Pacific (1 Track)	Vernon		
	South Downey Road	Vernon	1931	
	Bandini Boulevard	Vernon	1969	
	South Soto Street	Vernon	1928	
	East 26th Street	Vernon	2000	
	Railroad: BNSF - San Bernardino Subdivision (2 Tracks)	Los Angeles (Boyle Heights)		
	Railroad: Redondo Flyover: Metrolink Orange County Line & 91/Perris Valley Line, Amtrak Pacific Surfliner & Southwest Chief, and BNSF freight (2 Tracks)	Los Angeles (Boyle Heights)	2002	
	East Washington Boulevard (HAER CA-284)	Los Angeles (Boyle Heights)	1931	
	Railroad: Union Pacific - Los Angeles Subdivision (3 Tracks)	Los Angeles (Boyle Heights)		
	East 9th Street, carrying Olympic Boulevard (HAER CA-177)	Los Angeles (Boyle Heights)	1925	
	I-10 (Santa Monica Freeway), consists of 6 separate crossings for freeway mainline and interchange ramps	Los Angeles (Downtown)	1959	
	East 7th Street (HAER CA-282)	Los Angeles (Downtown)	1927	
	Sixth Street Bridge	Los Angeles (Downtown)	2022	
	East 4th Street (HAER CA-280)	Los Angeles (Downtown)	1930	
	East 1st Street (HAER CA-175) and Metro E Line (2 Tracks in street median)	Los Angeles (Downtown)	1929	
	US 101 (Santa Ana Freeway)	Los Angeles (Downtown)	1944	
	El Monte Busway	Los Angeles (Downtown)	1989	
	Macy Street Bridge, carrying Cesar E. Chavez Avenue (HAER CA-277)	Los Angeles (Chinatown)	1926	
	Railroad: Metrolink San Bernardino Line & Riverside Line (1 Track)	Los Angeles (Chinatown)		
	Mission Tower Railroad Bridge: Union Pacific - Alhambra Subdivision & Amtrak (2 Tracks, North Track splits to NE and E on bridge, South Track unused at present)	Los Angeles (Chinatown)		
	North Main Street (HAER CA-276)	Los Angeles (Chinatown)	1910	
	North Spring Street (HAER CA-275)	Los Angeles (Chinatown)	1928	
	Buena Vista Bridge, carrying North Broadway (HAER CA-274)	Los Angeles (Chinatown)	1909	
	Railroad: Metro A Line (2 Tracks)	Los Angeles (Chinatown)		
	Figueroa Street Viaduct (HAER CA-265-J) SR 110 (Arroyo Seco Parkway northbound)	Los Angeles (Chinatown)	1937	
	Los Angeles River Bridge SR 110 (Arroyo Seco Parkway southbound)	Los Angeles (Cypress Park and Echo Park)	1943	
	Downey Railroad Bridge: Metrolink Antelope Valley Line & Ventura County Line, Amtrak Pacific Surfliner & Coast Starlight (2 Tracks); future California High-Speed Rail - Burbank to Los Angeles section	Los Angeles (Cypress Park and Echo Park)		
	Dayton Avenue Bridge carrying Riverside Drive	Los Angeles (Cypress Park and Echo Park)	1939 (demolished 2015)	
	Riverside Drive and Los Angeles River Greenway Trail	Los Angeles (Cypress Park and Echo Park)	2017	
	Elysian Viaduct; I-5 (Golden State Freeway)	Los Angeles (Cypress Park and Echo Park)	1962	
	Taylor Yard Bicycle and Pedestrian Bridge	Los Angeles (Elysian Valley)	2021	
	SR 2 (Glendale Freeway)	Los Angeles (Atwater Village)	1961	
	Fletcher Drive (HAER CA-273)	Los Angeles (Atwater Village)	1927	
	Red Car Pedestrian Bridge	Los Angeles (Atwater Village)		
	Glendale-Hyperion Bridge Victory Memorial Viaduct, carrying Glendale Boulevard and Hyperion Avenue (HAER CA-272)	Los Angeles (Atwater Village)	1929	
	Sunnynook Drive Pedestrian Bridge	Los Angeles (Atwater Village)		
	Los Feliz Boulevard	Los Angeles (Atwater Village)	1925	
	La Kretz Pedestrian Bridge (North Atwater Pedestrian Bridge)	Los Angeles (Atwater Village)	2020	
	Colorado Street Freeway Extension	Los Angeles (Atwater Village)	1957	
	SR 134 (Ventura Freeway), includes 1 separate freeway interchange ramp crossing	Glendale and Los Angeles (Los Feliz)	1962	
	I-5 (Golden State Freeway)	Glendale and Los Angeles (Los Feliz)	1957	
	Riverside Drive	Glendale and Los Angeles (Los Feliz)	1938	
	Mariposa Equestrian Bridge	Burbank and Los Angeles (Hollywood Hills)	1939	
	SR 134 (Ventura Freeway)	Burbank and Los Angeles (Hollywood Hills)	1957	
	Private road to Warner Brothers Studios (Gate 7)	Burbank and Los Angeles (Hollywood Hills)		
	Barham Boulevard and Olive Avenue	Burbank and Los Angeles (Hollywood Hills)	1935	
	Cahuenga Boulevard and Lankershim Boulevard	Los Angeles (Studio City)	1940	
	US 101 (Hollywood Freeway)	Los Angeles (Studio City)	1957	
	Vineland Avenue	Los Angeles (Studio City)	1930	
	Tujunga Avenue	Los Angeles (Studio City)	1949	
	Dilling Street Pedestrian Bridge	Los Angeles (Studio City)		
	Colfax Avenue	Los Angeles (Studio City)	1956	
	Gilligan's Island Road (private) in the CBS Studio Center	Los Angeles (Studio City)		
	Radford Avenue	Los Angeles (Studio City)	1950	
	Laurel Canyon Boulevard	Los Angeles (Studio City)	1951	
	Laurelgrove Avenue Pedestrian Bridge	Los Angeles (Studio City)	1996	
	Whitsett Avenue	Los Angeles (Studio City)	1950	
	Coldwater Canyon Avenue	Los Angeles (Studio City)	1951	
	Fulton Avenue	Los Angeles (Studio City)	1951	
	Moorpark Street	Los Angeles (Studio City)	1952	
	Rye Street/Sunnyslope Avenue Pedestrian Bridge	Los Angeles (Sherman Oaks)		
	Woodman Avenue	Los Angeles (Sherman Oaks)	1952	
	Hazeltine Avenue	Los Angeles (Sherman Oaks)	1960	
	US 101 (Ventura Freeway)	Los Angeles (Sherman Oaks)	1959	
	Van Nuys Boulevard	Los Angeles (Sherman Oaks)	1952	
	Service Bridge	Los Angeles (Sherman Oaks)		
	Kester Avenue	Los Angeles (Sherman Oaks)	1972	
	Sepulveda Boulevard	Los Angeles (Sherman Oaks)	1928	
	I-405 (San Diego Freeway), includes 1 separate freeway interchange ramp crossing (upstream of mainline bridge)	Los Angeles (Sherman Oaks)	1958	
	Sepulveda Dam	Los Angeles (Encino)		
	Burbank Boulevard (twin bridges)	Los Angeles (Encino)	1974	
	Balboa Boulevard (twin bridges)	Los Angeles (Encino)	1941 and 1964	
	Busway: Metro G Line	Los Angeles (Encino)		
	White Oak Avenue	Los Angeles (Encino)	1960	
	Lindley Avenue	Los Angeles (Encino)	1957	
	Victory Boulevard	Los Angeles (Reseda)	1963	
	Etiwanda Avenue Pedestrian Bridge	Los Angeles (Reseda)		
	Reseda Boulevard	Los Angeles (Reseda)	1955	
	Amigo Avenue Pedestrian Bridge	Los Angeles (Reseda)		
	Wilbur Avenue	Los Angeles (Reseda)	1957	
	Vanalden Avenue Pedestrian Bridge	Los Angeles (Reseda)		
	Tampa Avenue	Los Angeles (Reseda)	1957	
	Corbin Avenue	Los Angeles (Reseda)	1957	
	Winnetka Avenue	Los Angeles (Winnetka)	1958	
	Vanowen Street	Los Angeles (Winnetka)	1958	
	Mason Avenue	Los Angeles (Winnetka)	1958	
	De Soto Avenue	Los Angeles (Winnetka)	1958	
	Variel Avenue Pedestrian Bridge	Los Angeles (Canoga Park)		
	Busway: Metro G Line and Canoga Avenue Pedestrian Walkway	Los Angeles (Canoga Park)	2012	
	Canoga Avenue	Los Angeles (Canoga Park)	1956	
	Owensmouth Avenue	Los Angeles (Canoga Park)	1958	

== Gallery of aerial views of multiple bridges ==
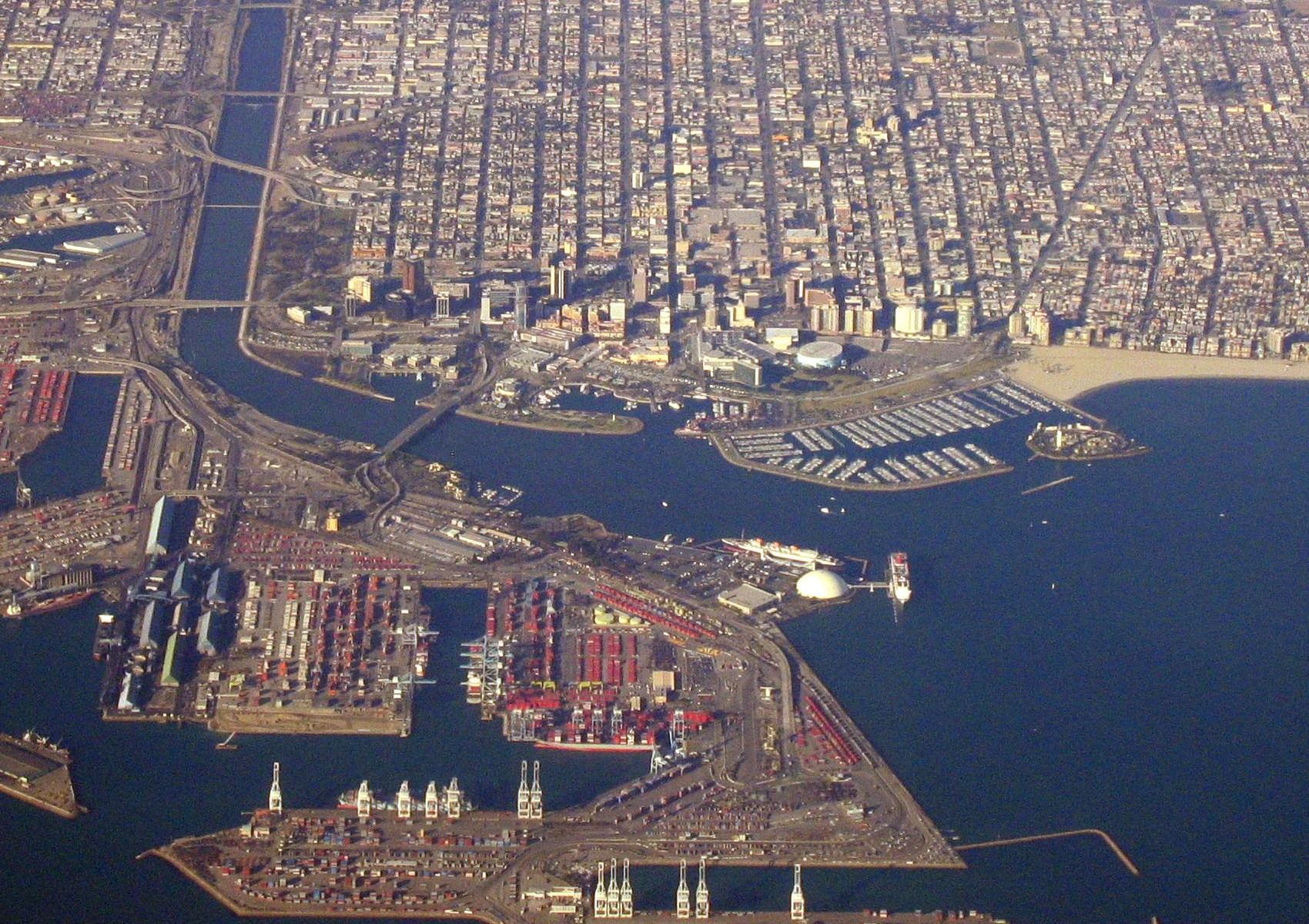
Bridges from the mouth of the Los Angeles River up to the West Willow Street Bridge in Long Beach, looking north

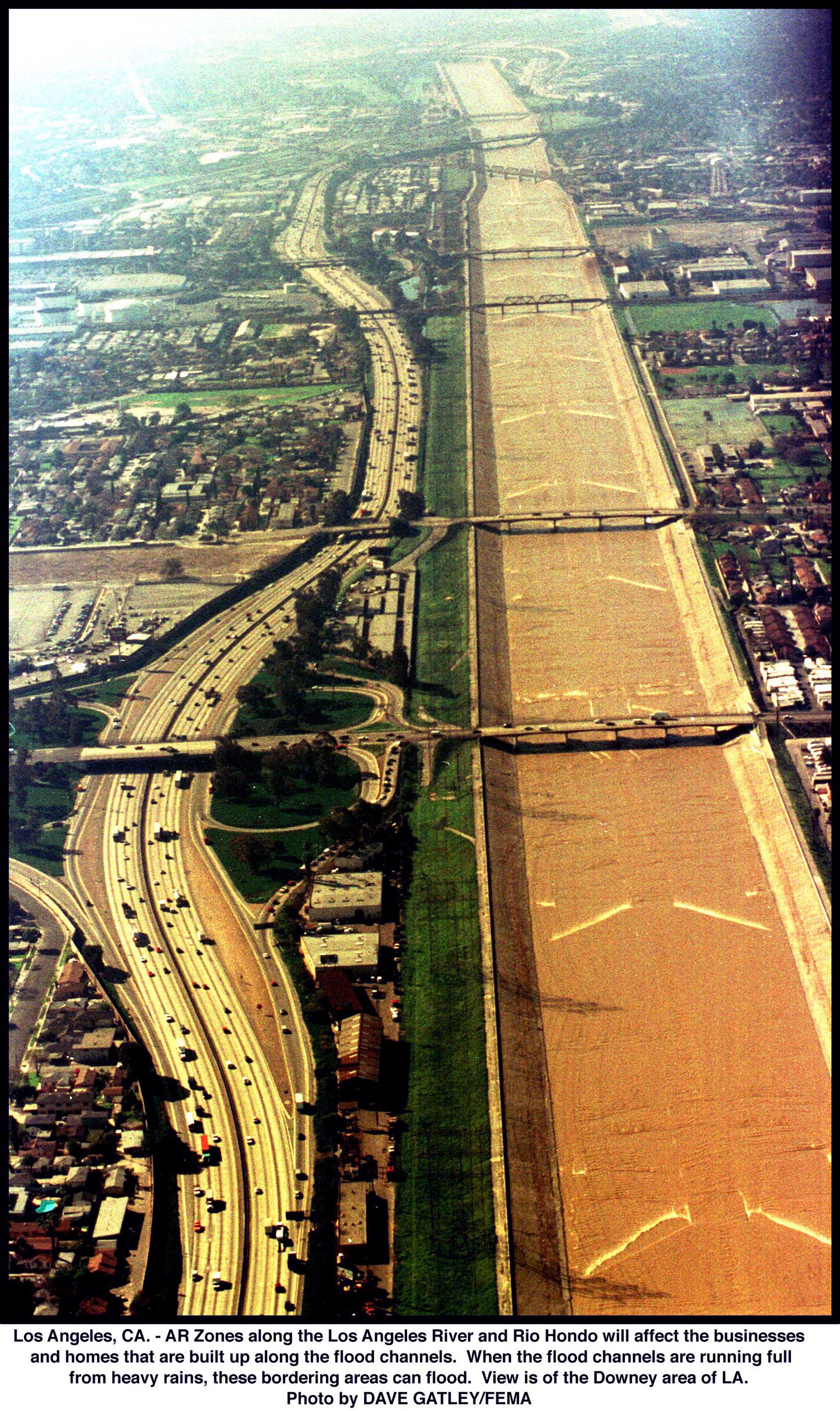
Bridges from Imperial Highway to Florence Avenue in South Gate and Bell Gardens, looking south

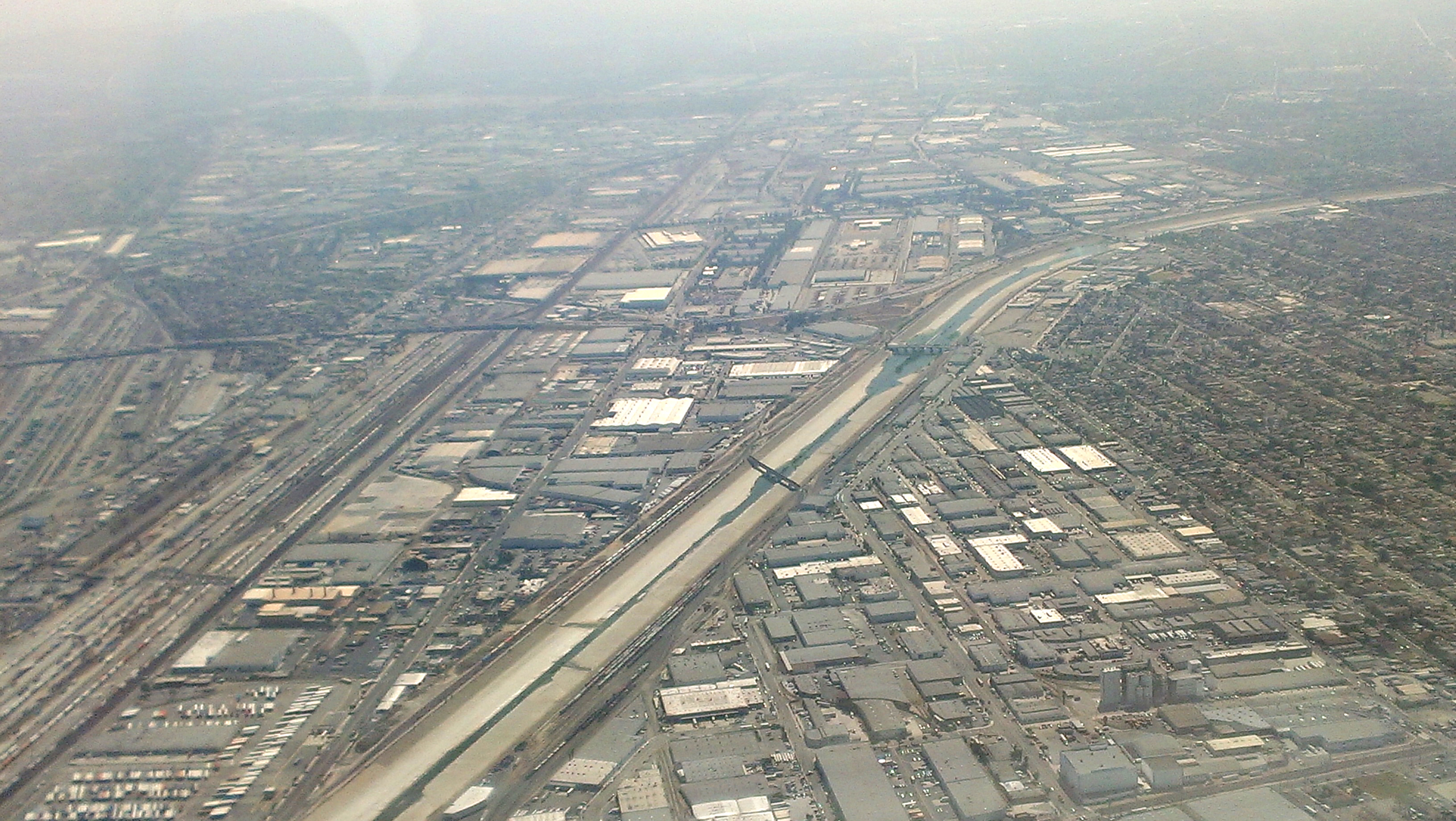
Bridges from Gage Avenue to South Atlantic Boulevard in and around Bell, looking southeast

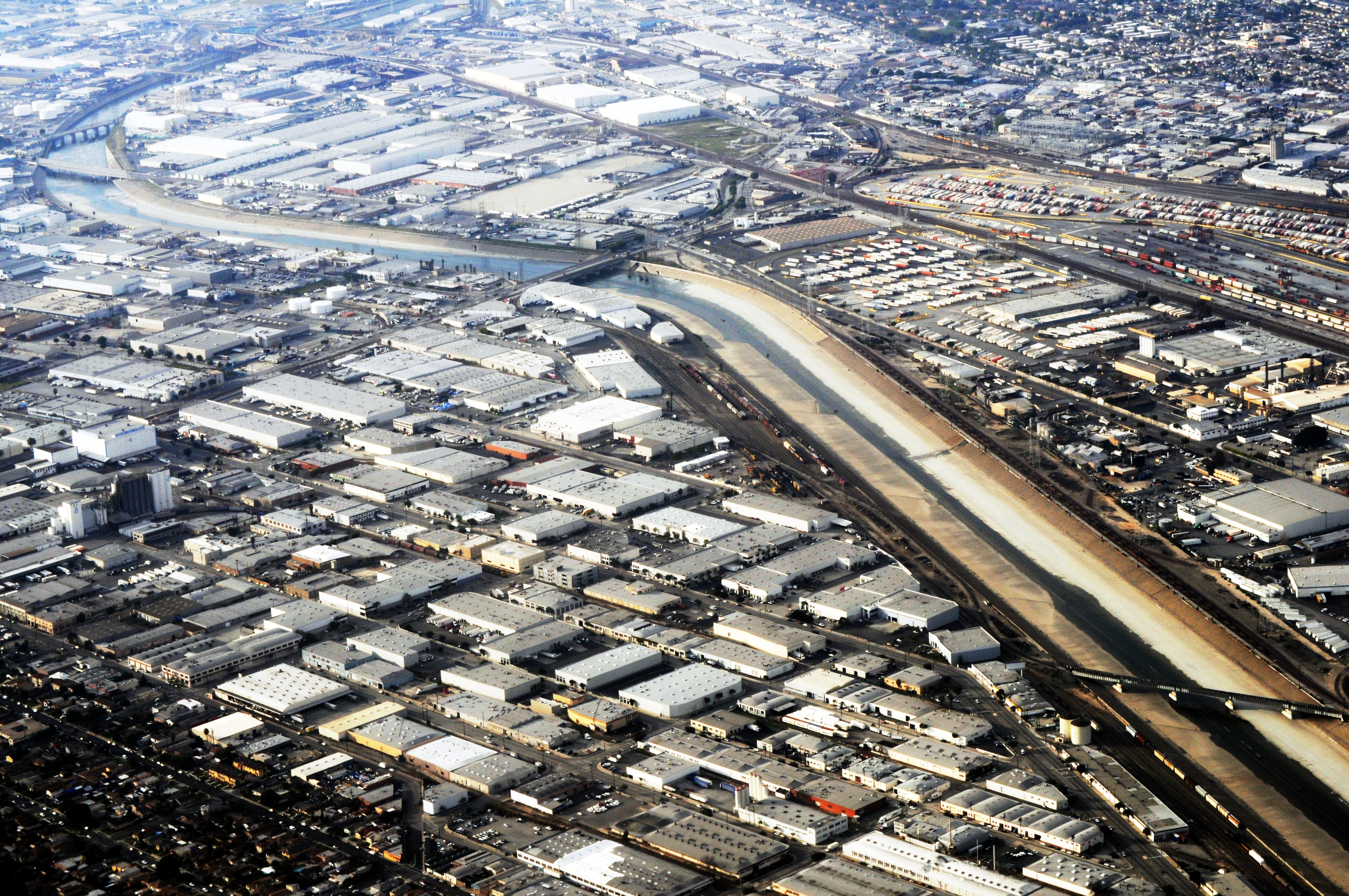
Bridges from a railroad bridge to South Soto Street in Vernon, looking north

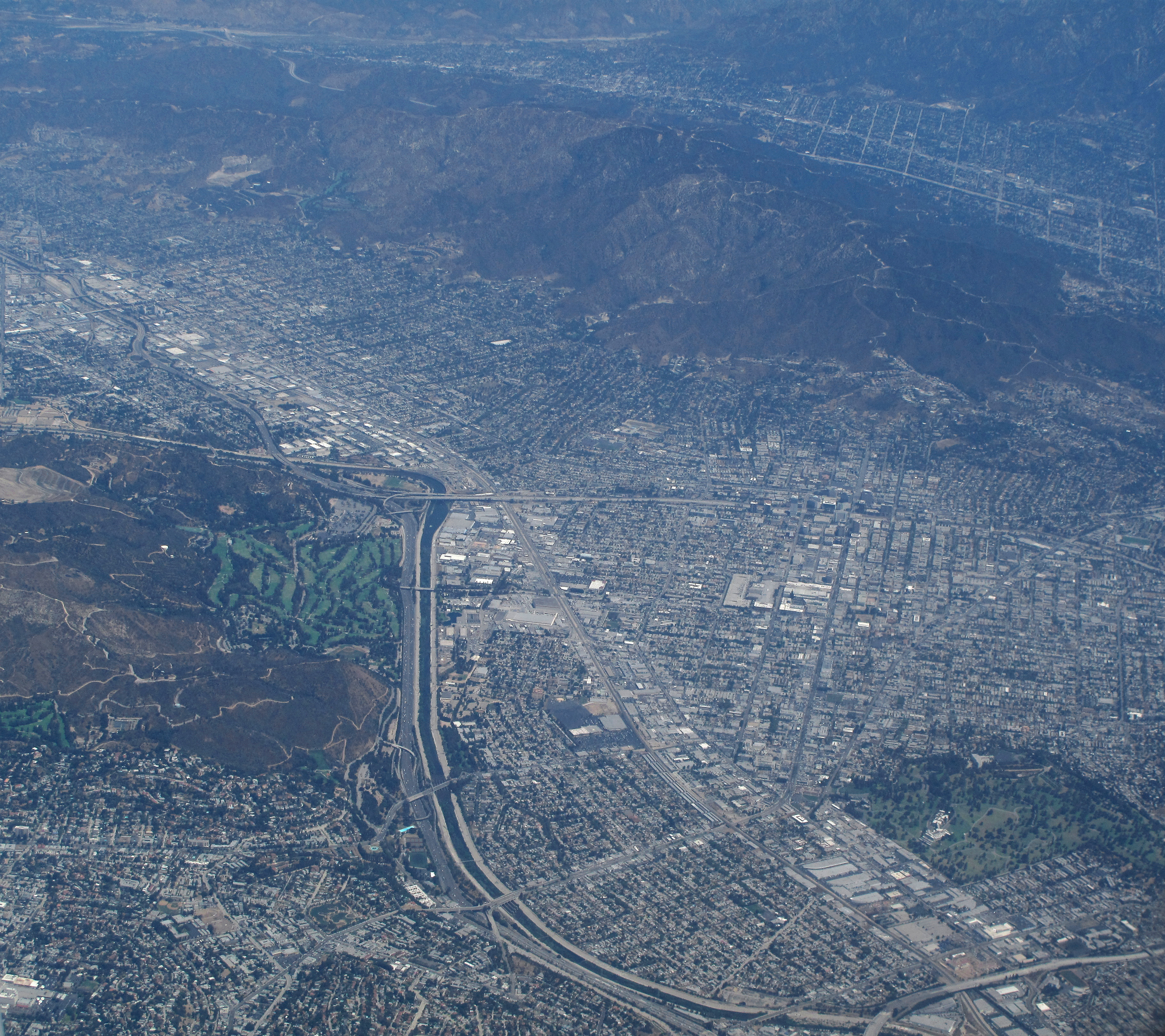
Glendale Narrows section from Glendale Freeway to Riverside Drive Bridges, looking north
