= Sixth Street Viaduct =

Bridge in Los Angeles, California

6th Street Viaduct
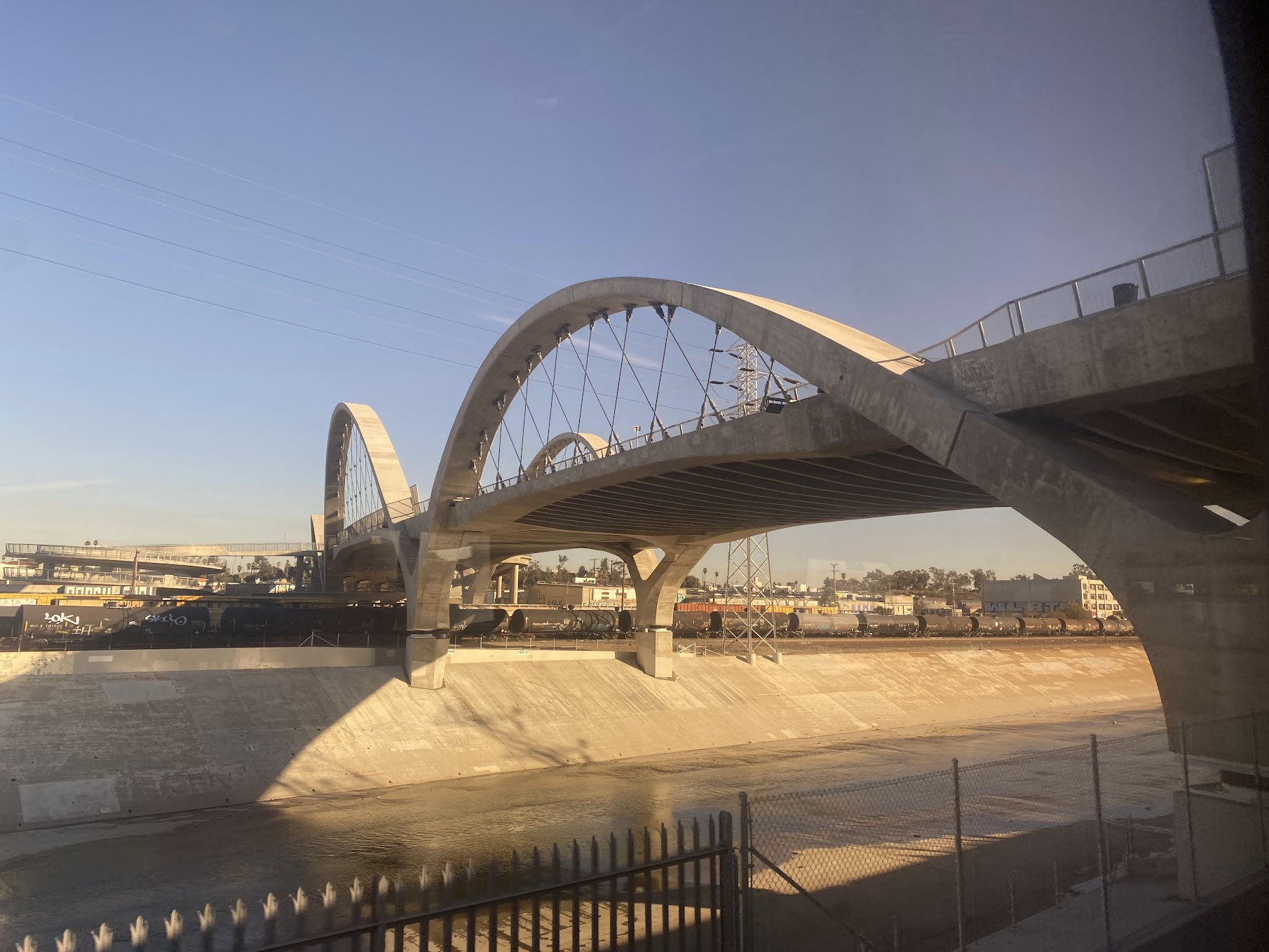
- The second incarnation of the Sixth Street Viaduct, 2023
- Coordinates: 34°2′17″N 118°13′37″W
- Carries: 6th Street/Whittier Boulevard
- Crosses: Metrolink tracks, Los Angeles River, Union Pacific Railroad tracks, Santa Ana Freeway, Golden State Freeway, several local streets
- Locale: Downtown and Boyle Heights areas of Los Angeles, California
- Official name: Sixth Street Bridge from the LA River
- Other name: 6th Street Viaduct
- Maintained by: City of Los Angeles and California Department of Transportation (Caltrans)
- ID number: 53C-1880 (City of Los Angeles), 53-0595 (Caltrans)

Characteristics
- Design: Viaduct
- Material: Reinforced concrete and steel
- Total length: 3,500 feet (1,100 m)
- Width: 46 feet (14 m)

History
- Opened: November 9, 1932; 93 years ago (Original viaduct); July 9, 2022; 4 years ago (Replacement viaduct)
- Closed: January 27, 2016; 10 years ago (Original viaduct)

Location
- Interactive map of 6th Street Viaduct

The Sixth Street Viaduct, also known as the Sixth Street Bridge, is a viaduct bridge that connects 6th Street in the Arts District in Downtown Los Angeles with Whittier Boulevard in the Boyle Heights neighborhood. The Sixth Street Viaduct spans the Los Angeles River, the Santa Ana Freeway (US 101), and the Golden State Freeway (I-5), as well as Metrolink (Orange County and 91/Perris Valley lines), Amtrak (Pacific Surfliner and Southwest Chief), and Union Pacific (along with Metrolink's Riverside Line) railroad tracks and several local streets.

The first incarnation, which opened in 1932 and demolished in 2016, was replaced with the second incarnation in 2022. The predecessor was composed of three independent structures: the reinforced concrete west segment, the central steel arch segment over the river, and the reinforced concrete east segment. In 1986, the Caltrans bridge survey found the Sixth Street Viaduct eligible for inclusion in the National Register of Historic Places.

The demolition of the predecessor bridge was due to serious structural issues, including several large cracks, resulting from the high alkaline content of the concrete composition, due to architectural unsophistication. As a result, concerns over the structure's seismic instability outweighed its historical status, leading to its closure for demolition and replacement in January 2016. The new replacement bridge was completed six years later and opened on July 9, 2022. Since opening the new replacement bridge has gone dark, and has been vandalized.

== Demolition and replacement ==
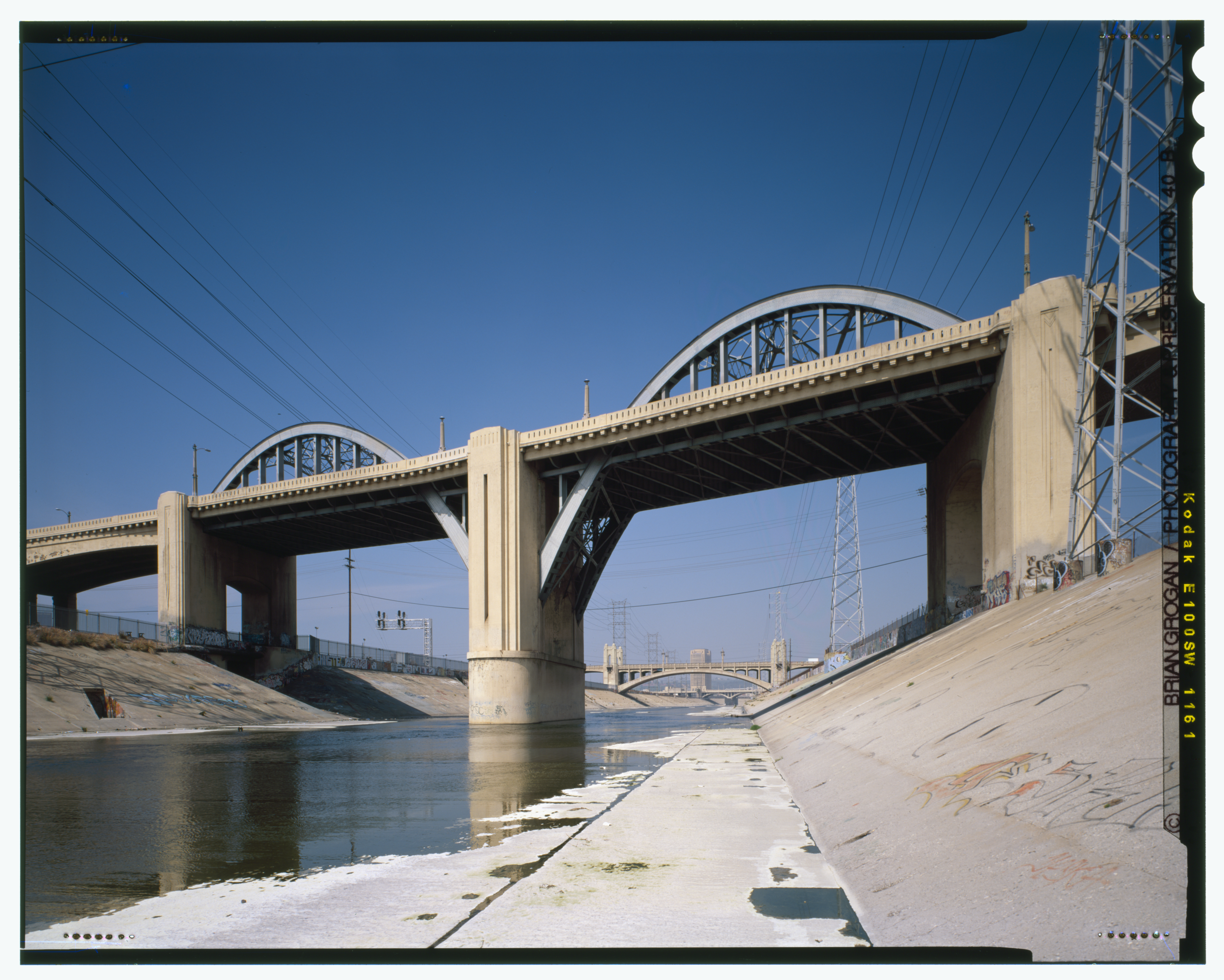
The 1932 incarnation over the Los Angeles River

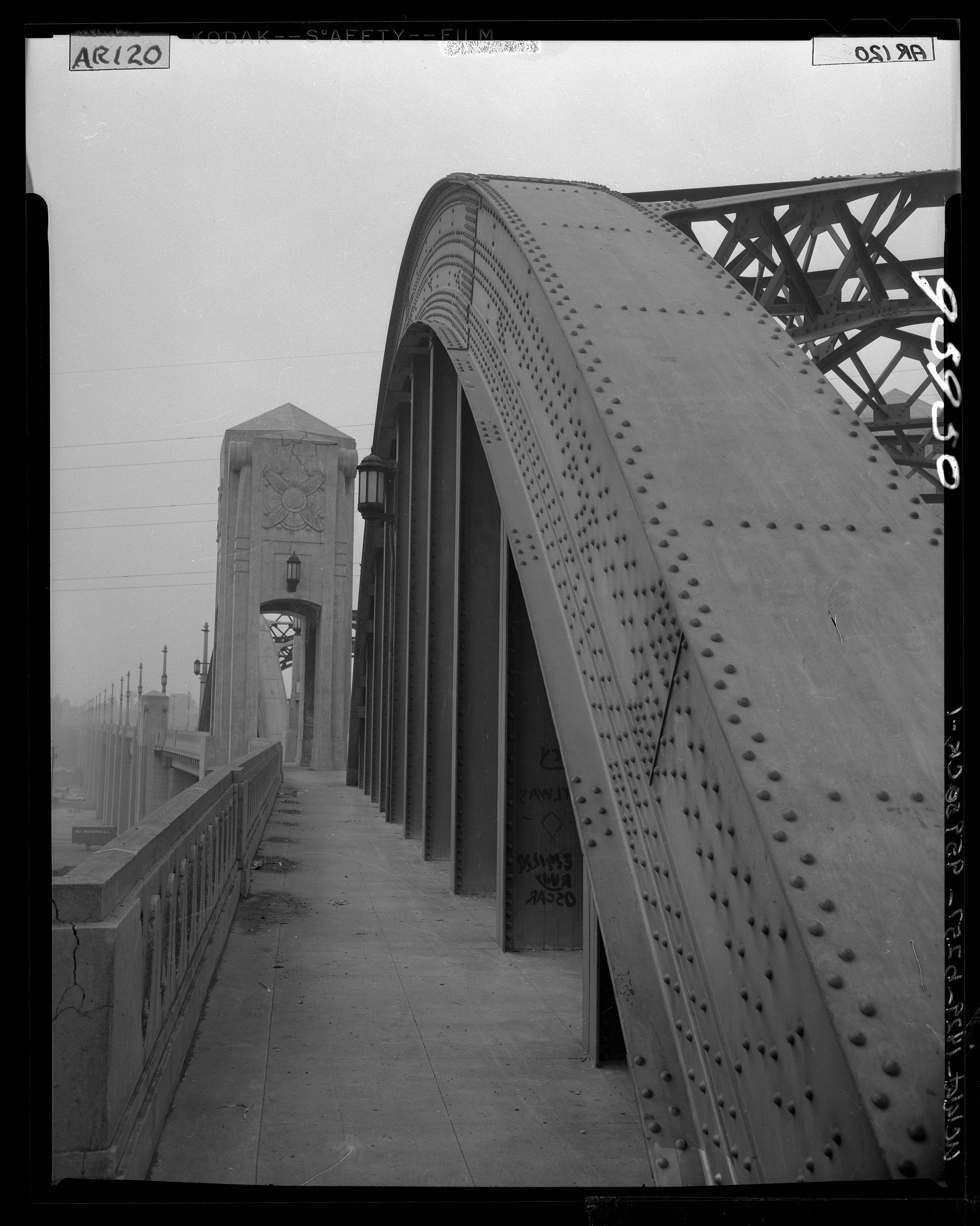
Walkway and steel arch girder of the original 6th Street Viaduct over the Los Angeles River, 1956

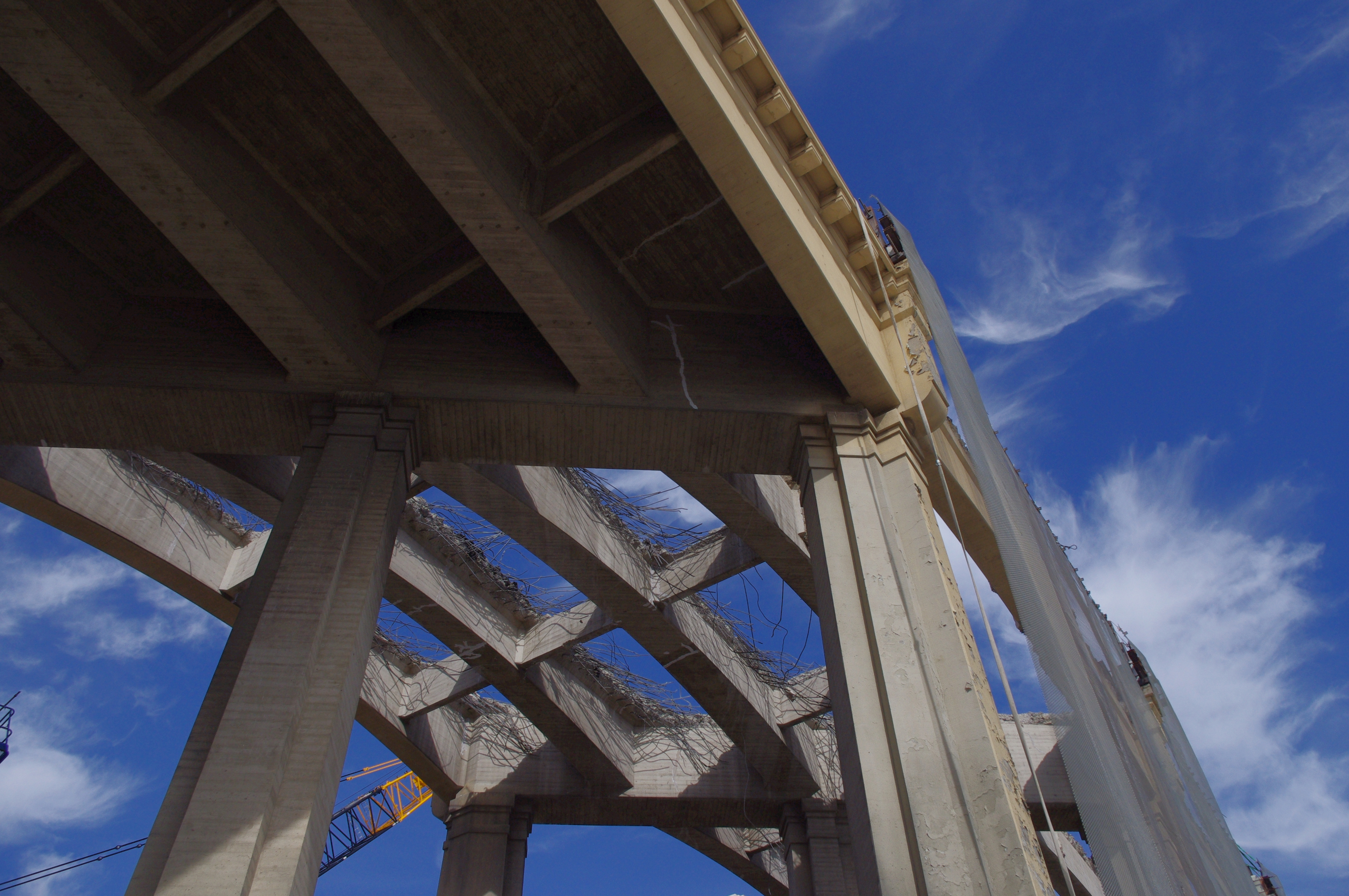
Demolition of the predecessor viaduct bridge in April 2016

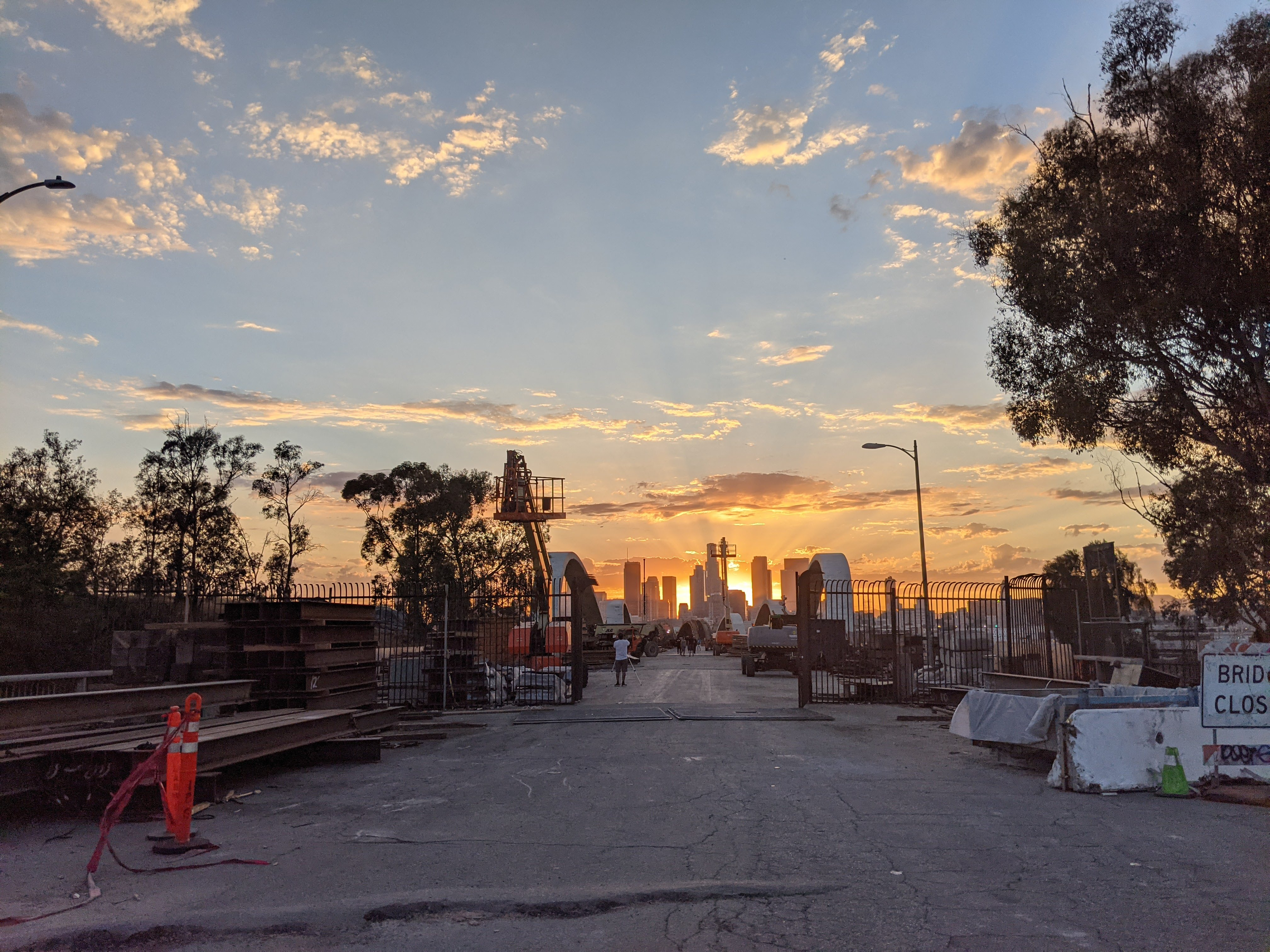
The new viaduct during construction as seen from Boyle Heights on June 22, 2021.

During the construction of the viaduct in the 1930s, an onsite plant was used to supply the concrete for construction. However, the quality of the concrete turned out to have a high alkali content and led to an alkali-silica reaction (ASR), which created cracks in the concrete and sapped the strength of the structure. It is the only one of the historic L.A. River viaduct bridges to suffer from ASR.

Estimates stated that the viaduct had a 70% probability of collapse due to a major earthquake within 50 years. After initial demolition plans were delayed, the bridge was closed on January 27, 2016, and demolition began on February 5, 2016. It took nine months to demolish the existing bridge.

Prior to the demolition, Los Angeles mayor Eric Garcetti recorded the R&B song "101SlowJam", backed by musicians from the city's Roosevelt High School, and issued it via a video on his own YouTube channel. The public service announcement video advertised the closure of parts of the 101 Freeway to accommodate the demolition of the viaduct. An estimated 48,000 cubic yards (37,000 m^{3}) of concrete, 1,245 tons of structural steel, and 4,200 tons of rebar were hauled away as construction began on the replacement.

The newly completed bridge is designed by architect Michael Maltzan and the HNTB Design-Build team and contractors Skanska and Stacy and Witbeck. The new design has several green spaces built under and around it. Bridge construction has experienced several years-long construction delays and multimillion-dollar cost increases. When opened, the new span included single-direction bicycle lanes separated from motor traffic with rubber curb bumps and impact-forgiving bollards, a design feature that was universally panned as unsafe and dangerous to cyclists using the bridge. A need for emergency vehicle access was given as justification for this design decision by officials, however this has been challenged by advocacy groups and community members. The bridge opened on July 9, 2022.

A park was planned to be made underneath the replacement bridge, with construction of it beginning in August 2023, with plans to complete construction in 2026. In 2026, the opening of the park was delayed to 2027.

=== Replacement damage and vandalism ===
By June 13, 2024, wire thieves had stripped out 38,000 feet (12,000 m) of copper wiring powering the bridge's LED lighting system, leaving it entirely darkened. Lighting remained out in 2025 due to continued theft of wiring at the bridge, and vandalism continued to occur on the bridge despite attempts to stop it. The bridge has been the site of multiple street takeovers. By February 2026, almost 7 miles (11 km) worth of copper wire has been stolen from the bridge.

== Artworks ==
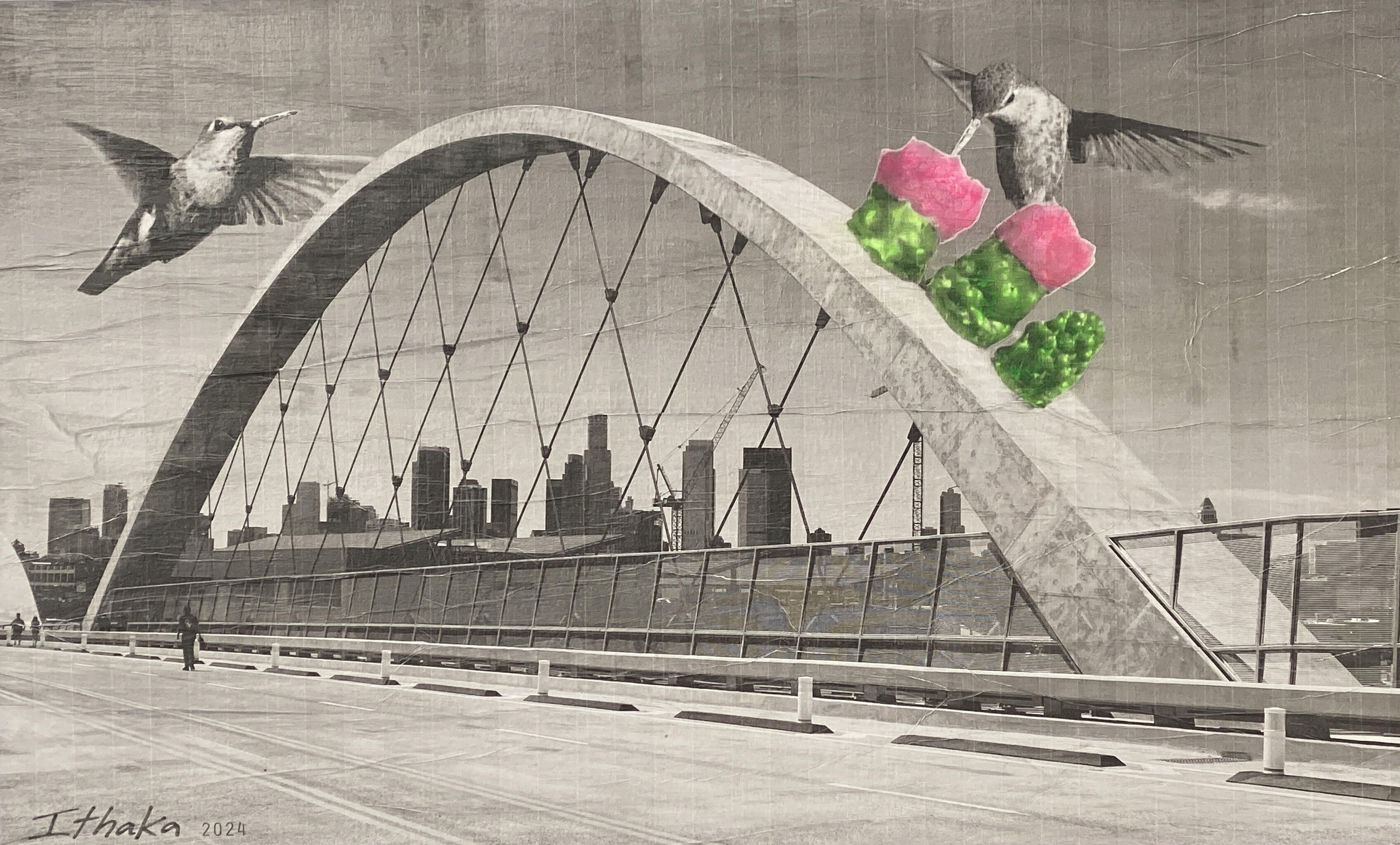
Colibrís Gigantes en el Puente de la Calle Sexta

Colibrís Gigantes en el Puente de la Calle Sexta a 2024 mixed-media art piece by Ithaka Darin Pappas portraying two gigantic hummingbirds feeding from cactus flowers growing directly from the concrete arches of the Sixth Street Viaduct.

== See also ==
- List of crossings of the Los Angeles River
- List of bridges documented by the Historic American Engineering Record in California
