= Queensway Twin Bridges =

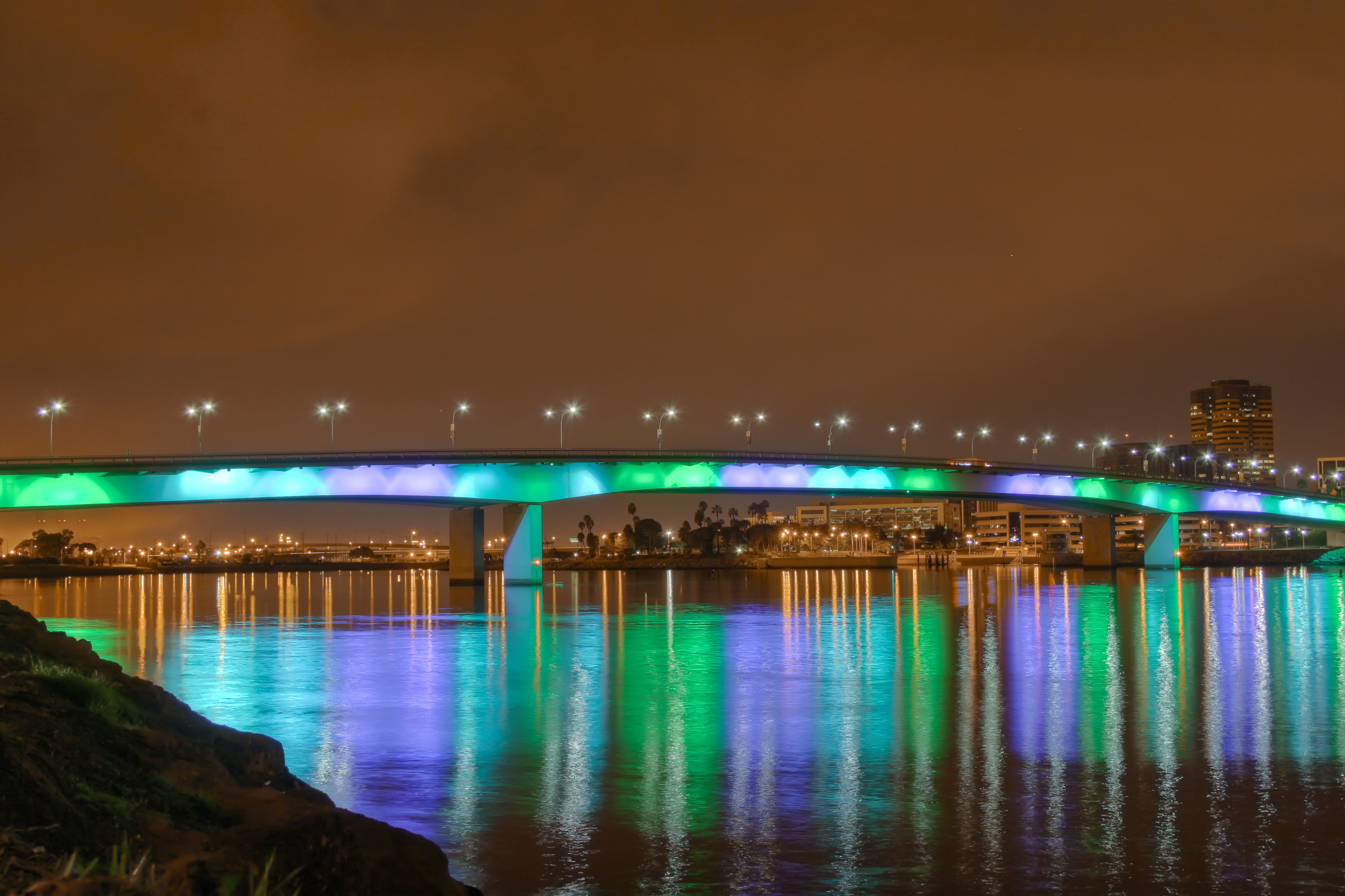
- Queensway Twin Bridges, lit at night
- Coordinates: 33.759985°N 118.199294°W
- Carries: Queens Way
- Crosses: Los Angeles River / Queensway Bay
- Locale: Long Beach, California
- NBI: 53C-0551 L/R

Characteristics
- Design: Orthotropic deck steel box girder
- Material: Steel
- Total length: 1,200 ft (370 m) each (5,400 ft (1,600 m) each, including approaches)
- Width: 46 ft (14 m) each
- Longest span: 500 ft (150 m) each
- No. of spans: 3 each
- Piers in water: 4 total (2 per bridge)
- Clearance below: 45 ft (14 m)
- No. of lanes: 6 (3 on each bridge)

History
- Designer: Martin A. Nishkian
- Construction end: June 1970
- Construction cost: 1966: US$15,500,000 (equivalent to $153,808,000 in 2025)
- Opened: October 5, 1970

Location
- Interactive map of Queensway Twin Bridges

The Queensway Twin Bridges (sometimes Queens Way Bridges or Queensway Bay Bridge) connect downtown Long Beach with the outer Port of Long Beach. They are the southernmost crossing of the Los Angeles River, near the mouth of the river, where it empties into Queensway Bay, and they are the primary arterial link between Long Beach and RMS Queen Mary. The bridges were completed in June 1970 and opened on October 5, 1970.

== History ==
During the planning and construction phase, the bridge was known as the Magnolia Avenue Bridge or Magnolia Bridge. The consulting engineering firm headed by Martin A. Nishkian was retained to design the bridge.

The bridges were built relatively quickly. The superstructure was prefabricated offsite, shipped and partially assembled before being erected in 14 pieces over only 11 days. Murphy Pacific fabricated the complete superstructure in their Richmond, California yard and shipped it to Long Beach in 30 sections via barge. Six segments were erected on the harbor side in late January 1970; the six mirror-image segments were erected on the Long Beach side in early May 1970; finally, the largest and heaviest 290-foot-long (88 m) drop-in sections of the main spans were erected on May 26, 1970.

By 1972, the bridges had taken on their present name.

In April 2010, seismic retrofits were started on ramps leading to the bridges. The contractor abruptly abandoned work in November 2010, as the contractor stated that they had not been paid and the County of Los Angeles finding fault in the contractor's work to-date.

== Design ==
Each bridge carries an orthotropic deck atop steel box girders. Each bridge spans a total of 1,200 ft (370 m), excluding approaches, as a three-span girder bridge, with a 500 ft (150 m) main span flanked on each side by a 350 ft (110 m) side span. Including the 1,900 ft (580 m) south and 2,300 ft (700 m) north approaches, the total length of each bridge is 5,400 ft (1,600 m). The deck is coated with an epoxy asphalt wearing surface.

The main span includes a central 290 ft (88 m), 617-short-ton (560 t) drop-in section which was lifted in place by the Marine Boss floating crane. The drop-in span is supported on each side by a 105 ft (32 m) section cantilevered off the pier. The Bridges feature a 45 ft (14 m) vertical clearance above the average low tide mark and provide three lanes of traffic in each direction with a 6 ft (1.8 m) wide sidewalk outboard of the traffic lanes. The cost of the bridge was estimated at US$7,391,632 (equivalent to $71,370,000 in 2025), with the approach structures costing an additional US$5,882,761 (equivalent to $56,800,000 in 2025).

The Bridges subsequently won an AISC Prize Bridge Award in 1971.

== In popular culture ==
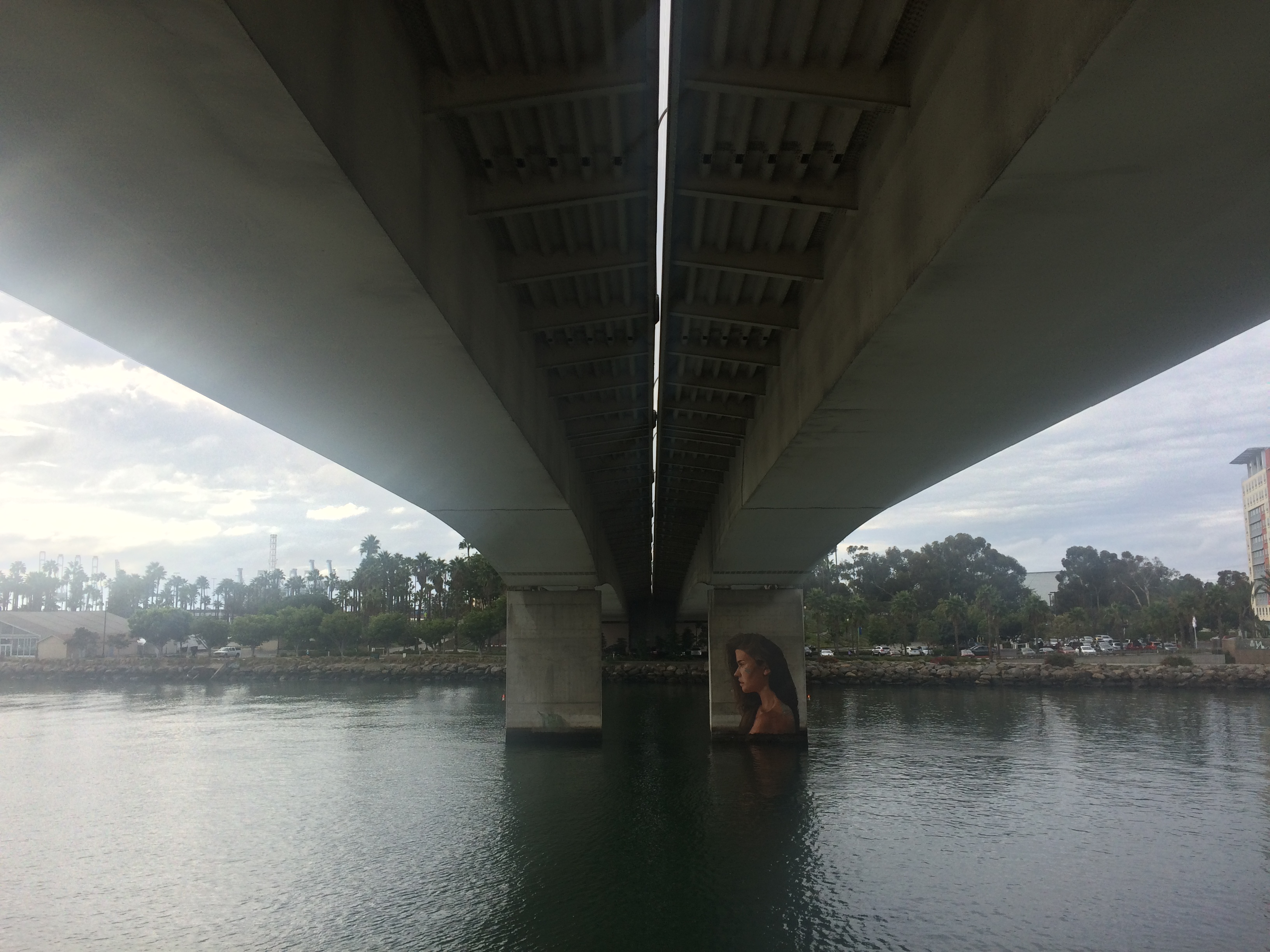
View of bridge from underneath (2016), which has been used as the shooting location for scenes from Dexter

The cost of closing the Queensway Bridges is only US $2,500 per day, facilitating filming on weekdays when many other Los Angeles-area locations are difficult to close. The Queensway Twin Bridges have served as the filming locations for numerous television shows and movies, most notably in:

- CSI: Miami (2002–2012): Numerous instances.
- Anchorman: The Legend of Ron Burgundy (2004): The biker, played by Jack Black, throws Ron's dog Baxter off the Queensway Twin Bridges.
- Dexter (2006–13): In the season 2 episode The British Invasion (2007), Lila parks under the bridge and examines Dexter's bag of tools; and in the season 3 episode The Lion Sleeps Tonight (2008), Dexter meets with Miguel Prado under the bridge.
- Bedtime Stories (2008): A candy truck gets into an accident on the bridge, raining gumballs on Skeeter.
- Get Smart (2008): Driving scenes were shot on the bridge.
- Transformers: Revenge of the Fallen (2009): The bridge served as a freeway in Shanghai.
- Knight and Day (2010): Roy and June ride a motorcycle across the bridge (with the location transplanted to Spain).
- The Bridge (2013–14): The Queensway Twin Bridges served as the eponymous Bridge of the Americas.
- Agents of S.H.I.E.L.D. (2013–2020): An explosion scene for the season 1 episode titled "The Bridge" was filmed on November 6, 2013.
- Rosewood (2015–2017): The Season 1 finale featured a car explosion filmed on the bridge.

== See also ==
- List of crossings of the Los Angeles River
