= Glendale-Hyperion Bridge =

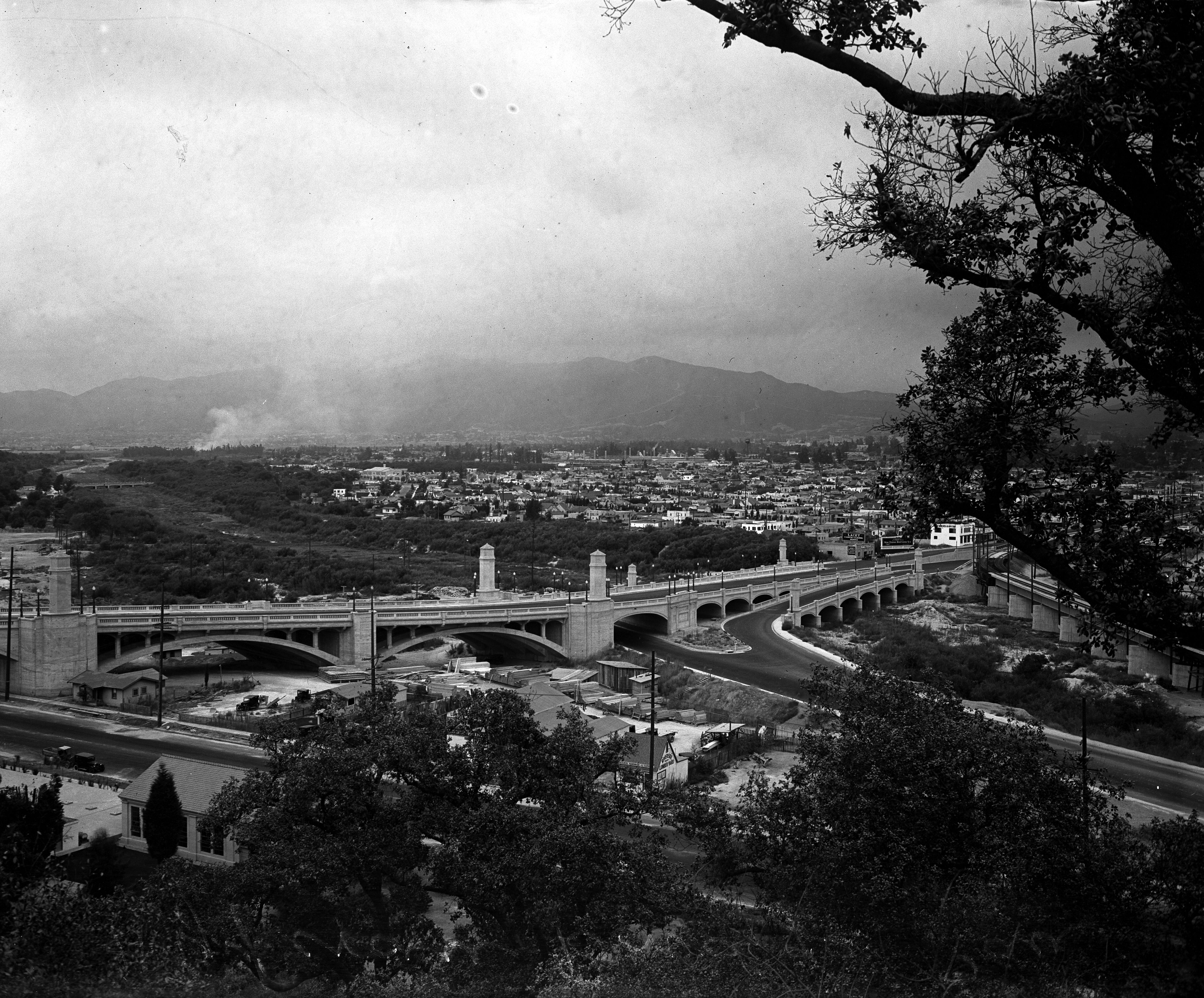
- The Glendale Hyperion Bridge c. 1928
- Coordinates: 34°6′49″N 118°15′55″W
- Carries: Motor vehicles Red Cars (until 1959)
- Crosses: Los Angeles River, I-5
- Locale: Silver Lake, Atwater Village
- Other name(s): Hyperion Bridge, Victory Memorial Bridge

Characteristics
- Design: Concrete arch viaduct
- Total length: 400 ft (120 m)
- Width: 85 ft (26 m)

History
- Designer: Merrill Butler
- Opened: February 1929

Location
- Interactive map of Glendale-Hyperion Bridge

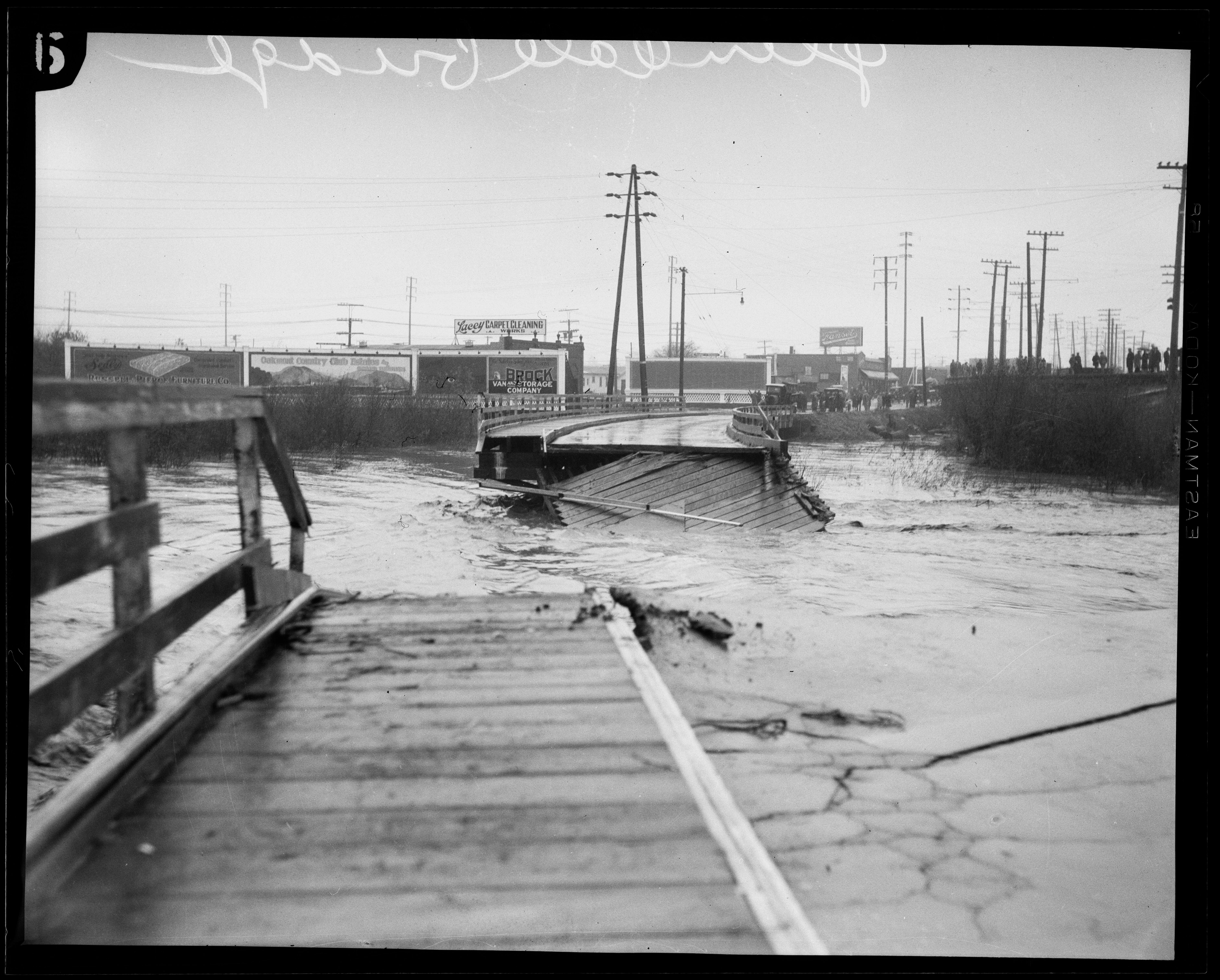
The 1910 wooden bridge shortly after it was destroyed by flooding in February 1927.

The Glendale-Hyperion Bridge is a concrete arch bridge viaduct in Atwater Village that spans the Los Angeles River and Interstate 5. The Hyperion Bridge was constructed in 1927 by vote of the citizens that lived in Atwater Village at the time and was completed in February 1929. The bridge spans 400 feet over the Atwater section of the Los Angeles River and has four car lanes. The bridge has become more widely known since the building of a small-scale replica at Disney California Adventure in Anaheim, California.

== History and construction ==
Before the building of the Glendale-Hyperion Bridge there was a wooden bridge where it now stands. That bridge, built around 1910, served as the main entrance to Atwater Village, until its collapse after a large flood in 1927.

After the collapse of the original bridge Atwater needed a more convenient way of traveling to downtown Los Angeles. That year the citizens of Atwater Village, which was about 2,100 individuals, voted for the building of a new bridge to cross the Los Angeles River. On March 27, 1927, construction began on the bridge. The original idea of building a bridge to cross the river was expanded to so the bridge would cross the pre-5 freeway. When the construction started, the city called the architectural designer, Merrill Butler. Merrill Butler bought 35,000 cubic yards (27,000 m^{3}) of concrete and 6 million pounds (2,700,000 kg) of reinforcing steel. They also drove about 1,500 wood and 3,200 concrete piles to support the piers and abutments. They also constructed 13 arches on the bridge. In total, Merrill Butler spent about $2 million on the construction of the bridge. Butler decided to put in a section for trolley cars to cross the bridge along with cars. In September 1928 the Hyperion Bridge was officially opened.

In 1929, the Pacific Electric Railway constructed a line next to the Hyperion Bridge that would have Red Cars cross the Los Angeles River and down Glendale Boulevard. Up until 1959 the Red Cars would routinely cross the Los Angeles River next to the Hyperion Bridge. The line was shut down in 1959 in favor of Freeways. Today the concrete walls that held up the Red Car tracks still stand although the tracks have since been dismantled. The bridge also served as a filming location in the 1988 live-action/animated film Who Framed Roger Rabbit as the end point of the Benny the Cab chase scene.

== Today ==
Today the Glendale-Hyperion Bridge still serves the people of Los Angeles and Glendale by serving as a crossing point between the cities. In 2004 multiple murals were painted on the old Red Car walls. Because of that the area underneath and around the Glendale-Hyperion Bridge is now named "Red Car Park". Prior to 2011, the area underneath the bridge served as an encampment for the local homeless. In 2011, all homeless people were removed as well as all of their belongings.

On May 12, 2015, Los Angeles City Councilman Mitch O'Farrell announced that the Atwater Red Car Pedestrian Bridge, a permanent pedestrian/bicycle bridge would be built atop the old Red Car Pylons, connecting the two banks of the L.A. River. The project began in 2018 after the design phase was completed, and coincided with a retrofitting for the Glendale-Hyperion Complex of Bridges Project. The 430 ft (130 m) long bridge was completed in January 2020 at a cost of $4 million, and is named after the Red Car trolleys that once used the bridge's route. The bridge is a multi-modal bridge serving both pedestrians and bikes.

=== Anaheim replica ===
In 2012, a small-scale version mimicking the architectural features of the Hyperion Bridge was revealed as a functioning bridge exclusively for the Disneyland Monorail System on Buena Vista Street in Disney California Adventure in Anaheim, California. This same monorail bridge had previously been styled to resemble San Francisco's Golden Gate Bridge when the park opened in 2001.

== See also ==
- Atwater Village
- Glendale Boulevard
- List of bridges documented by the Historic American Engineering Record in California
- Los Angeles River
