= Balloon Corps =

Balloon Corps may refer to

- History of military ballooning
- Union Army Balloon Corps, Civil War era
- Observation Balloon Service in World War I
- French Aerostatic Corps
- British Balloon Command
- German Balloon Corps
