= Taylor's Tavern =

Coordinates: 38°52.530′N 77°09.467′W

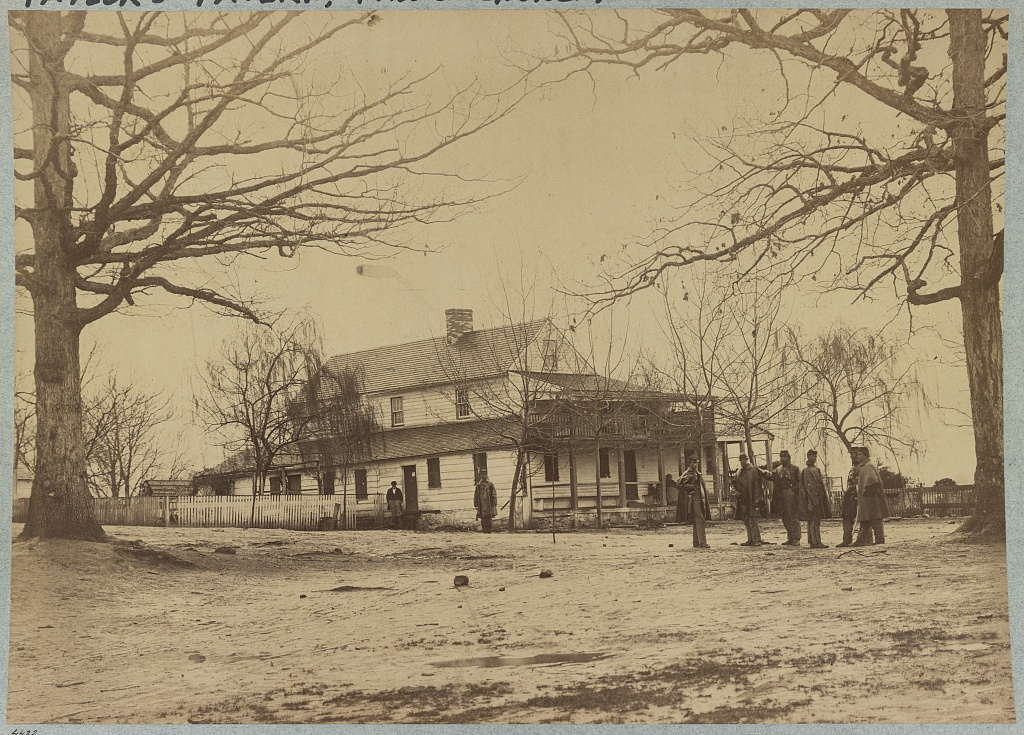
Taylor's Tavern during the Civil War.

Taylor's Tavern was a significant outpost for Union Forces during the US Civil War. It was among the first locations in Virginia where the two opposing sides came into contact. The tavern was probably built about 1800 near the site of an old Indian trading post at Seven Corners.

== Background ==
An inscription on a historical marker placed by the City of Falls Church, Virginia, at Taylor's Tavern, reads:

Two-story building with verandahs stood on 56 acres bought in 1856 by Wm. Taylor (part of 1731 271-acre T. Harrison grant). Tavern faced Alexandria-Leesburg Pike west of Junction with Georgetown Road (Wilson Boulevard). Near here on June 24, 1861, balloonist Thaddeus Lowe conducted first aerial reconnaissance in U.S. military history. In August–September CSA Col. J.E.B. Stuart's troops fortified Upton's & Munson's Hills. By October 1861 Union troops had reoccupied hills and added forts Taylor, Buffalo, and Ramsay as a separate group 4–5 miles west of main ring of Washington defenses.

The tavern was the site of the first aerial reconnaissance mission in the United States, a balloon flight by Thaddeus S. C. Lowe on June 24, 1861. With the assistance of a detachment of fifteen men, he carried his craft, the Enterprise, to the tavern site, from which he conducted a number of test flights.

The site of the tavern is today marked by Fort Taylor Park, a city park.
