= Paullin =

Paullin is a surname. Notable people with the surname include:

- Charles O. Paullin (1869–1944), American naval historian
- Louise Paullin (1848–1910), American stage actress
- William Paullin (1812–1871), American balloonist

== See also ==
- Paulin (disambiguation)
- Paulli
