= History of military ballooning =

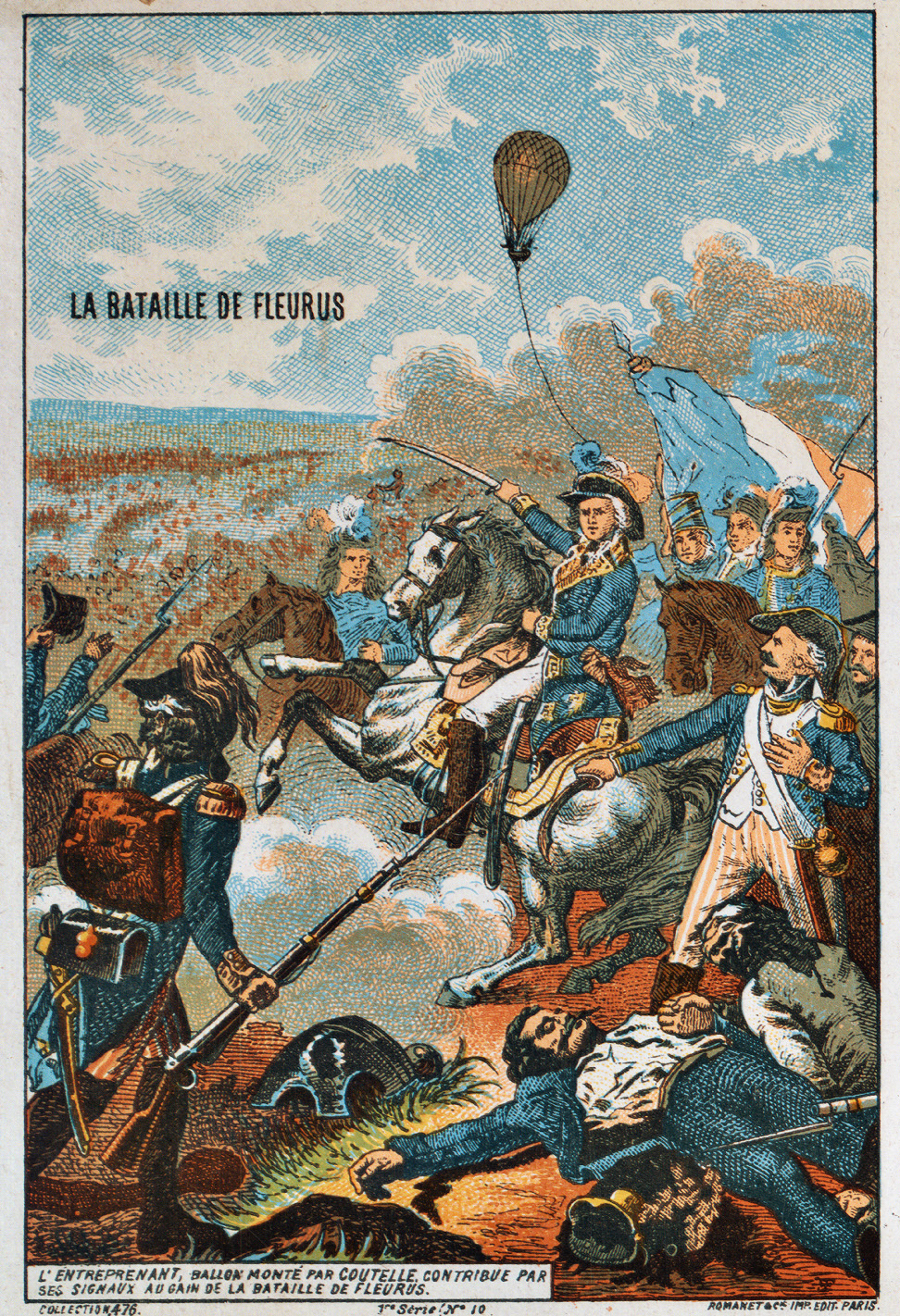
L'Entreprenant at the Battle of Fleurus (1794)

Balloons and kites were the first inventions used in aerial warfare and their primary role was reconnaissance. Balloons provided a reliable and stable means of elevating an observer high over the battlefield to obtain a birds-eye view of troop positions and movements. An early instrument of aerial intelligence collection, they were also useful for creating accurate battlefield maps, an important ingredient for battlefield success. Incendiary balloons also have a long history. Incendiary balloons carry hot air or something that can catch fire to destroy enemy territory. They could also hold small bombs for combat. The history of military ballooning dates back to the late 18th century, when the Montgolfier brothers, Joseph-Michel and Jacques-Étienne, first demonstrated the potential of hot-air balloons for military use. The first recorded military use of balloons was during the French Revolutionary Wars, when the French military used balloons to gather intelligence on the movements of the enemy. Balloons were also used during the American Civil War, where they were used for reconnaissance and communication. Balloons had a decline after several incidents in the interwar period.

In the late 19th century, military ballooning began to evolve, as advances in technology allowed for the development of more sophisticated balloons and equipment. Balloons were equipped with cameras, telegraphs, and other instruments that allowed for more detailed and accurate reconnaissance and observation.

During World War I, military ballooning reached its peak of development, as balloons were used extensively for reconnaissance and observation by both the Central powers and the Entente. Balloons were used to spot enemy movements, direct artillery fire, and provide early warning of enemy attacks. They were also used for transporting goods, messages, and people across the battlefield.

After World War I, the use of military balloons declined, as aircraft and other technological innovations made them less relevant. However, balloons were still used for some specialized purposes, such as for meteorological observations and for training pilots. During the Cold War, the United States sent hundreds of high-altitude balloons over Eastern Bloc countries to gather intelligence on their nuclear capabilities, before replacing them with its newer spy planes.

Today, military ballooning is not widely used, as other technologies such as drones and satellite have taken over its main roles.

== Kongming lantern ==
Kongming lanterns were used as military signalling. The lantern was invented in the late Han dynasty, when Han dynasty chancellor Zhuge Liang (Kongming) was surrounded by Wei dynasty General Sima Yi at Pinlo, Sichuan. Zhuge Liang used paper-made "lanterns," or hot air balloons, to signal the rescue forces. The Kongming lantern became a common military signal in China. The Mongolian army studied Kongming lanterns from China and used them in the Battle of Legnica during the Mongol invasion of Poland. This is the first time ballooning was known in the western world. Flying the Kongming lantern is now a civilian festival of memorizing chancellor Zhuge Liang in the Lantern Festival.

== Early Western balloons ==
=== Early French balloons ===
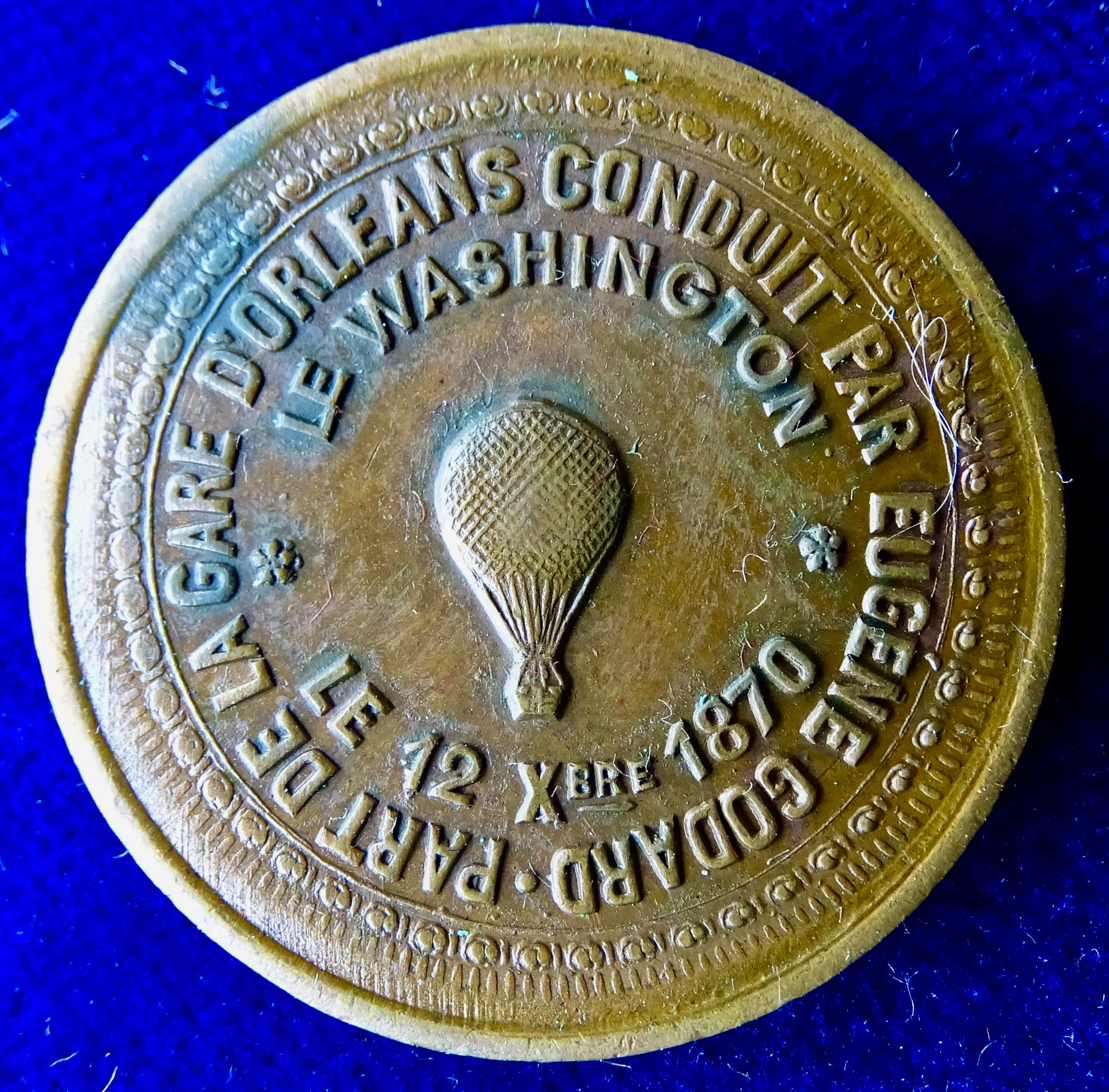
France 1870 Siege of Paris, Hot Air Balloon Le Washington, obverse

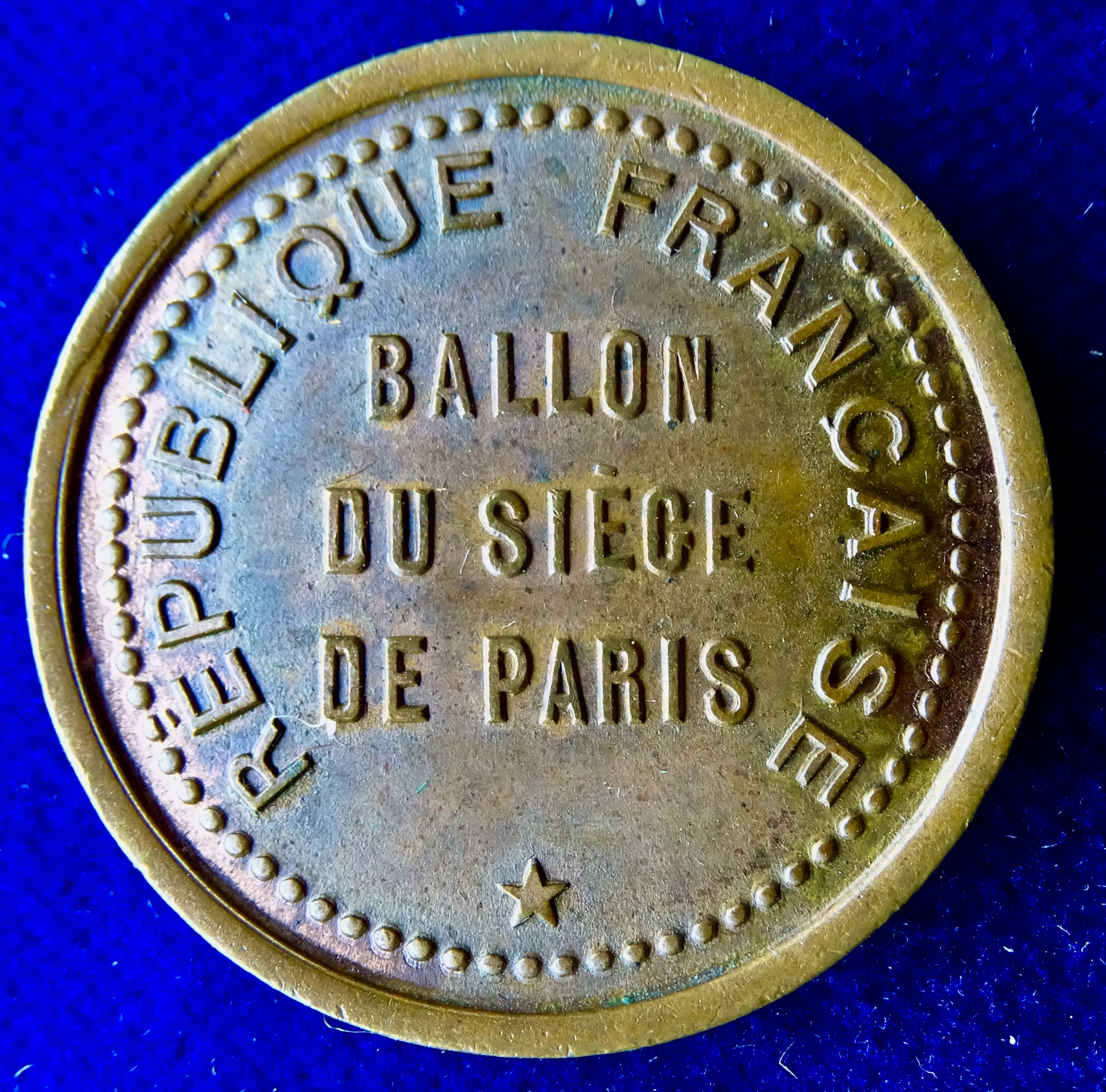
The reverse of this token. Eugène Godard was the balloonist of the Le Washington on 12 December 1870

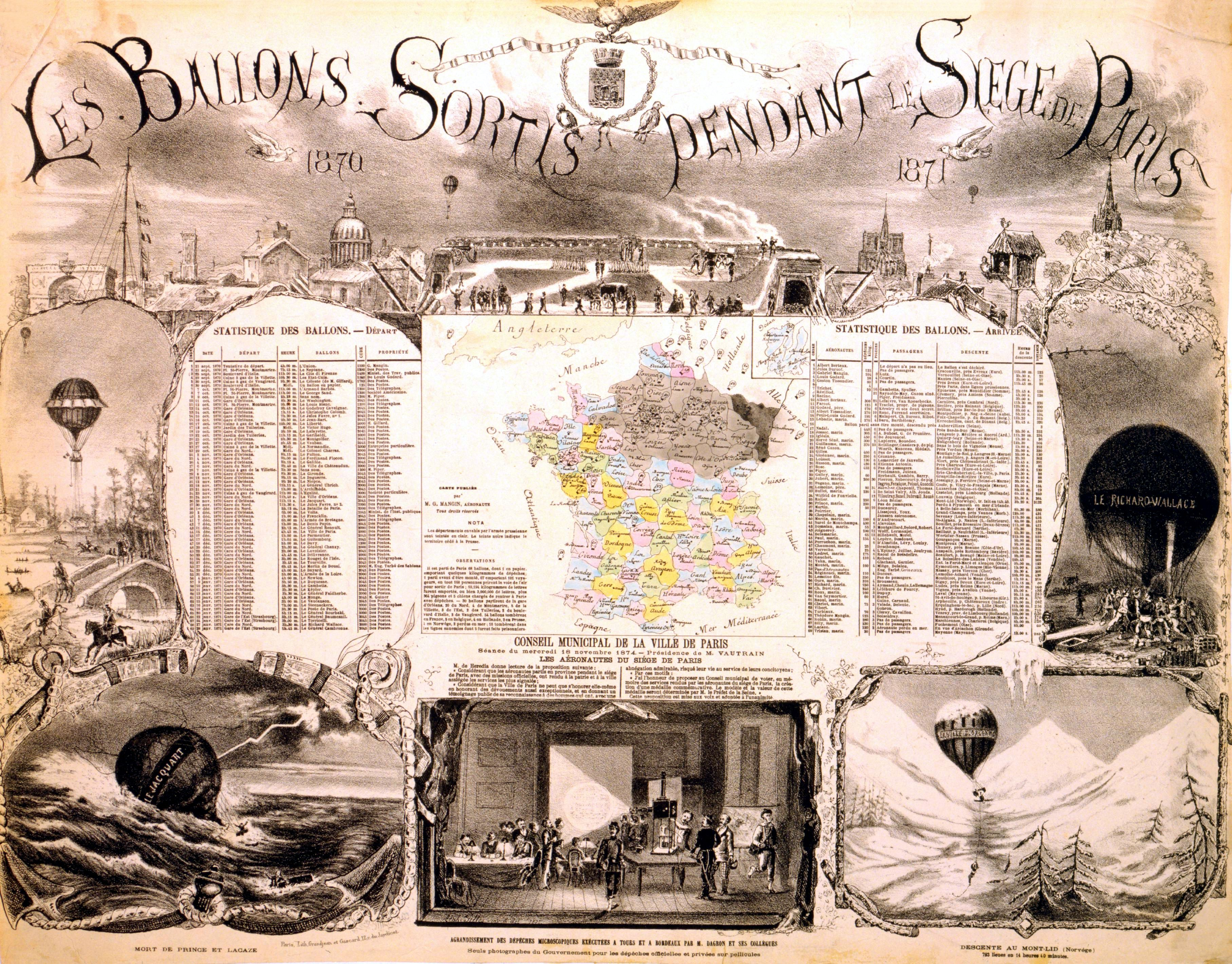
Balloons escaped from the Siege of Paris (1870–1871)

The first successfully flown balloons were made in France by the Montgolfier brothers in 1782–1783. They were rigid-style spheres made of cotton or silk stretched over a simple light wood frame resembling a large egg. These rigid balloons were held up over a fire so that the smoke billowed well into the cavity of the sphere. It was thought that the smoke made the balloons rise, but actually it was the hot air of the smoke that caused the elevating. The first decisive use of a balloon for aerial warfare was performed by the French Aerostatic Corps using the aerostat l’Entreprenant ("The enterprising one") at the Battle of Fleurus in 1794. The following year, during the Siege of Mainz an observation balloon was employed again. However, the French military use of the balloon did not continue uninterrupted, as in 1799 Napoleon disbanded the French balloon corps.

In 1804, Napoleon considered invading England by landing troops transported by balloons. He consulted his 'Aeronaut of Official Festivals', Sophie Blanchard, about whether invading England by balloon was viable. She told him that the invasion would likely not succeed due to the unpredictable winds in the English Channel.

In 1854, French aeronaut Eugène Godard performed several manned balloon demonstrations at the wedding of Austrian Emperor Franz Joseph I. The Emperor was so impressed that he drafted an agreement with Godard stating that, in the event of a war, he would build balloons, organize balloonists companies, and perform observation ascents for the Austrian military. However, in 1859, the French went to war against the Austrians, and Godard's observation balloons were used instead by French forces, contributing to a victory for Napoleon III over Franz Joseph. Godard's aerial reconnaissance balloons were again employed by the French in 1870 during the Franco-Prussian War and the Siege of Paris.

During the 1900 Boxer Rebellion in China, the French forces did bring a balloon with them, although there is no record of it ever having been deployed.

=== Austrian use at Venice in 1849 ===
The first aggressive use of balloons in warfare took place in 1849. Austrian imperial forces besieging Venice attempted to float some 200 paper hot air balloons each carrying a 24–30-pound (11–14 kg) bomb that was to be dropped from the balloon with a time fuse over the besieged city. The balloons were launched mainly from land; however, some were also launched from the side-wheel steamer SMS Vulcano that acted as a balloon carrier. The Austrians used smaller pilot balloons to determine the correct fuse settings. At least one bomb fell in the city; however, due to the wind changing after launch, most of the balloons missed their target, and some drifted back over Austrian lines and the launching ship Vulcano.

=== Balloons in the American Civil War ===
With the outbreak of the American Civil War, President Abraham Lincoln did consider the possibility of an air-war mechanism. This had some of the top balloonists in the country vying for position as chief aeronaut of a would-be aeronautics division. The scientific community as well showed great support in influencing Washington to consider the use of balloons. Eventually, it was Prof. Thaddeus S. C. Lowe who would be awarded the title Chief Aeronaut of the Union Army Balloon Corps.

The first major-scale use of balloons in the military occurred during the Civil War with the Union Army Balloon Corps established and organized by Prof. Thaddeus S. C. Lowe. Originally, the balloons were inflated with coal gas from municipal services and then walked out to the battlefield, an arduous and inefficient operation as the balloons had to be returned to the city every four days for re-inflation. Eventually, hydrogen gas generators, a compact system of tanks and copper plumbing, were constructed that combined iron filings and sulfuric acid to produce hydrogen. The generators were easily transported with the uninflated balloons to the field on a standard buckboard. However, this method shortened the life of the balloons, because traces of the sulfuric acid often entered the balloons along with the hydrogen. In all, Lowe built seven balloons that were fit for military service.

The first application thought useful for balloons was map-making from aerial vantage points, thus Lowe's first assignment was with the Corps of Topographical Engineers. General Irvin McDowell, commander of the Army of the Potomac, realized their value in aerial reconnaissance and had Lowe, who at the time was using his personal balloon, the Enterprise, called up to the First Battle of Bull Run. Lowe also worked as a Forward Artillery Observer (FAO) by directing artillery fire via flag signals. This enabled gunners on the ground to fire accurately at targets they could not see, a military first.

Lowe's first military balloon, the Eagle, was ready by 1 October 1861. It was called into service immediately to be towed to Lewinsville, Virginia, without any gas generator, which took longer to build. The trip began after inflation in Washington, D.C. and turned into a 12 mile (19 km), 12-hour excursion that was upended by a gale-force wind, which ripped the aerostat from its netting and sent it sailing to the coast. Balloon activities were suspended until all balloons and gas generators were completed.

With his ability to inflate balloons from remote stations, Lowe, his new balloon the Washington and two gas generators were loaded onto a converted coal barge the George Washington Parke Custis. As he was towed down the Potomac, Lowe was able to ascend and observe the battlefield as it moved inward on the heavily forested peninsula. This would be the military's first claim of an aircraft carrier.

The Union Army Balloon Corps enjoyed more success in the battles of the Peninsula Campaign than the Army of the Potomac it sought to support. The general military attitude toward the use of balloons deteriorated, and by August 1863 the Balloon Corps was disbanded.

The Confederate Army also made use of balloons, but they were gravely hampered by supplies due to the embargoes. They were forced to fashion their balloons from colored silk dress-making material, and their use was limited by the infrequent supply of gas in Richmond, Virginia. The first balloon "pilot" in the Confederate "air force" was Edward Porter Alexander. By the summer of 1863, all balloon reconnaissance during the Civil War had ceased.

==== First balloon assignments ====
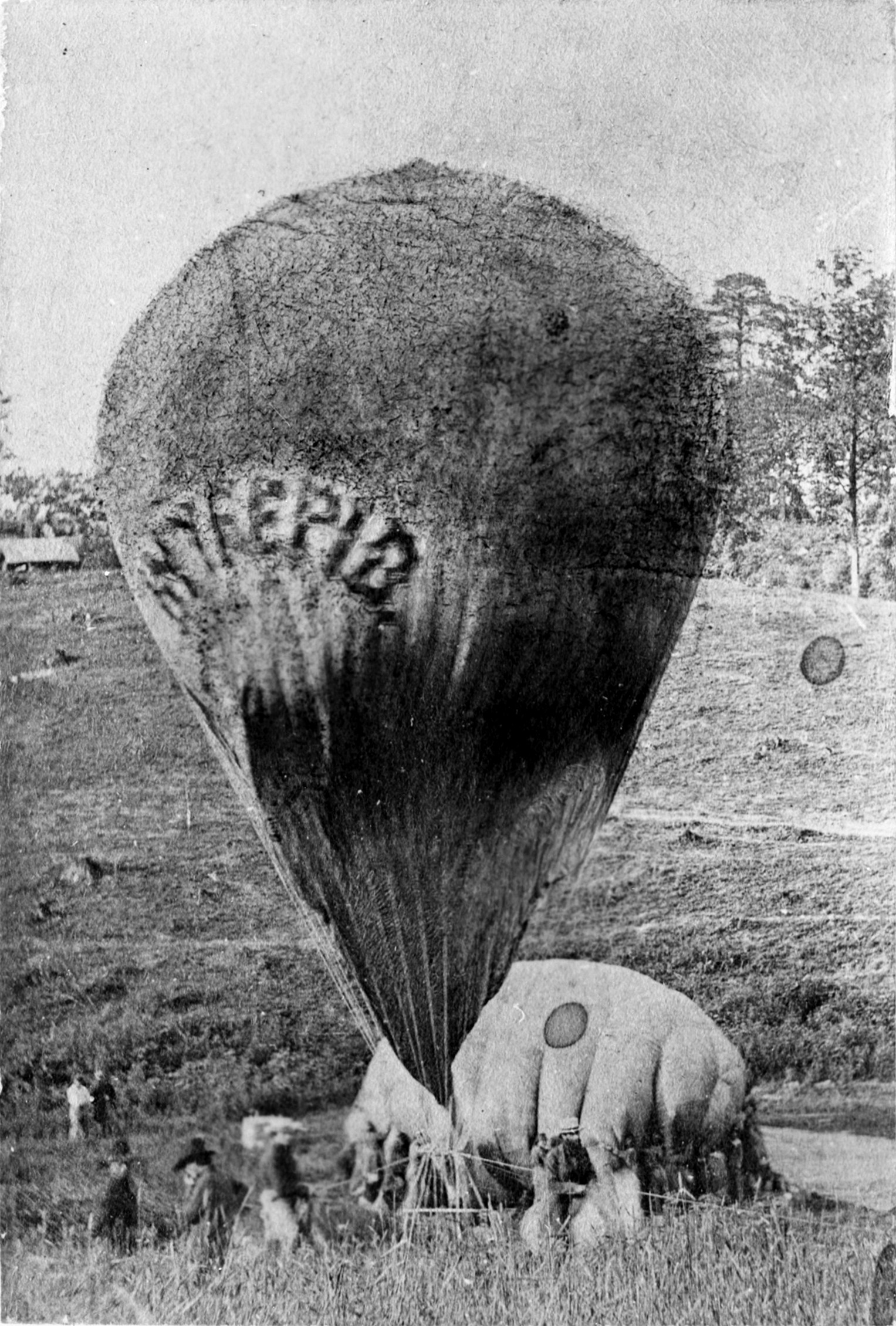
Intrepid being cross-inflated from Constitution in a mad-dash attempt to get the larger balloon in the air to overlook the imminent Battle of Fair Oaks.

The first assignment for tethered military balloons was given to the Union Army's Corps of Topographical Engineers for mapmaking, and observation of enemy troops as early as 1850. Up until that point, maps were made from ground level perspectives and their innate inaccuracy led to many a battlefield failure. The aerial perspective ostensibly improved mapmaking, especially when combined with the use of photography.

General Irvin McDowell, commander of the Army of the Potomac, called on the balloon to perform aerial observations of enemy encampments and movements in the First Battle of Bull Run. With Lowe's techniques proven to the top commanders, he was eventually tasked to build seven balloons and a series of hydrogen gas generators to inflate them in the battlefield. Even though Thaddeus Lowe was Chief Aeronaut, his bitter rival John La Mountain is credited with having made the first aerial observations of intelligence value while stationed independently at Fortress Monroe.

The balloon, under flight direction of Prof. Lowe, was also used to direct artillery fire from an unseen location onto a Confederate encampment. The balloon, Eagle, was ascended with tether and telegraph from Fort Corcoran north of Falls Church, Virginia. (The use of a telegraph to a balloon was previously successfully tested by Lowe on June 18, 1861.) An artillery battery was located at the easterly Camp Advance. With a series of predetermined flag signals, Lowe directed fire onto the Rebel encampment until the shots were landing on target. This first-used concept was the predecessor to the Forward Artillery Observer (FAO) and revolutionized the use of artillery even to modern day.

Prof. Lowe was once approached by the young Graf Ferdinand von Zeppelin in 1863, who was at the time acting as a then-civilian observer for the Union Army, about possibly serving as an aerial observer with Lowe, but this was forbidden by Union military authorities during the Civil War years, due to von Zeppelin's then-civilian status. The future rigid airship pioneer was instead directed to the camp of John Steiner, a German aeronaut already in the United States, to get his first flight experience in a balloon, which von Zeppelin was able to do at a slightly later time while he still was in the US.

==== The first aircraft carrier ====
Balloons and generators were loaded onto the USS George Washington Parke Custis, a converted coal barge. The balloons were towed down the Potomac River and were able to ascend and make observations of the battle front as it moved toward Richmond. On November 11, 1861, Lowe made the first observations from a balloon based from a ship. This is the first ever recorded observation from an aerial station by water, essentially the first-ever aircraft carrier (balloon tender).

Lowe went on to make observations at Fair Oaks, Sharpsburg, Vicksburg and Fredericksburg before political ambush both from within the military and in Congress forced him to resign in April 1863 at which point he returned to the private sector. The Balloon Corps all but ceased to exist by August 1863.

==== Confederate ballooning ====
The Confederates tried their hand at ballooning as well, more only to counter the balloons of the Federals. One type of balloon was a Montgolfier style of a rigid, cotton, “hot smoke” balloon. The attempts worked, but their handling techniques were poor at best and the balloon was easily lost and captured by the North.

Another style is referred to as the “silk dress balloon,” aerostat envelopes made of multicolored dress making silk (not actually silk dresses) which, when gas was available, were used effectively over Richmond. Again, these were easily lost, destroyed or captured, and the lack of supply made it impossible to replace them. They were relieved when the Union Army had discontinued the use of balloons.

The Confederate Balloon Corps also made use of an aircraft carrier, the CSS Teaser. The Teaser transported and launched one of the Confederate balloons to several observation positions before being captured by the Union Navy in July 1862.

=== Paraguayan War ===
On 6 July 1867, during the Paraguayan War, observation balloons were used by Brazil, assisted by the Allen brothers, James and Ezra, after their aerial intelligence pioneering for the Union army.

=== British ballooning ===
Between 1862 and 1871, efforts by two Royal Engineers officers, were made to catch the attention of senior British officers to the potential use of balloons. In July 1863, experimental balloon ascents for reconnaissance purposes were conducted by the Royal Engineers on behalf of the British Army, but although the experiments were successful it was considered not worth pursuing further because it was too expensive. However, by 1878, a Balloon Equipment Store was established at Woolwich by the Royal Engineers. By this time, the limitations imposed by the need to produce hydrogen in the field by some portable apparatus and finding a suitable material for the envelope of a war balloon had been resolved.

In 1888, a School of Ballooning was established at Chatham, Medway, Kent. It moved to Stanhope Lines, Aldershot in 1890 when a balloon section and depot were formed as permanent units of the Royal Engineers establishment.

Balloons were first deployed by the British Army during the expeditions to Bechuanaland and Suakin in 1885. They were also deployed during the Second Boer War (1899–1902), where they were used in artillery observation with the Kimberley column and during the Siege of Ladysmith.

On October 5, 1907, Colonel John Capper (late Royal Engineers) and team flew the military airship Nulli Secundus from Farnborough around St. Paul's Cathedral in London and back with a view to raising public interest.

== World War I ==
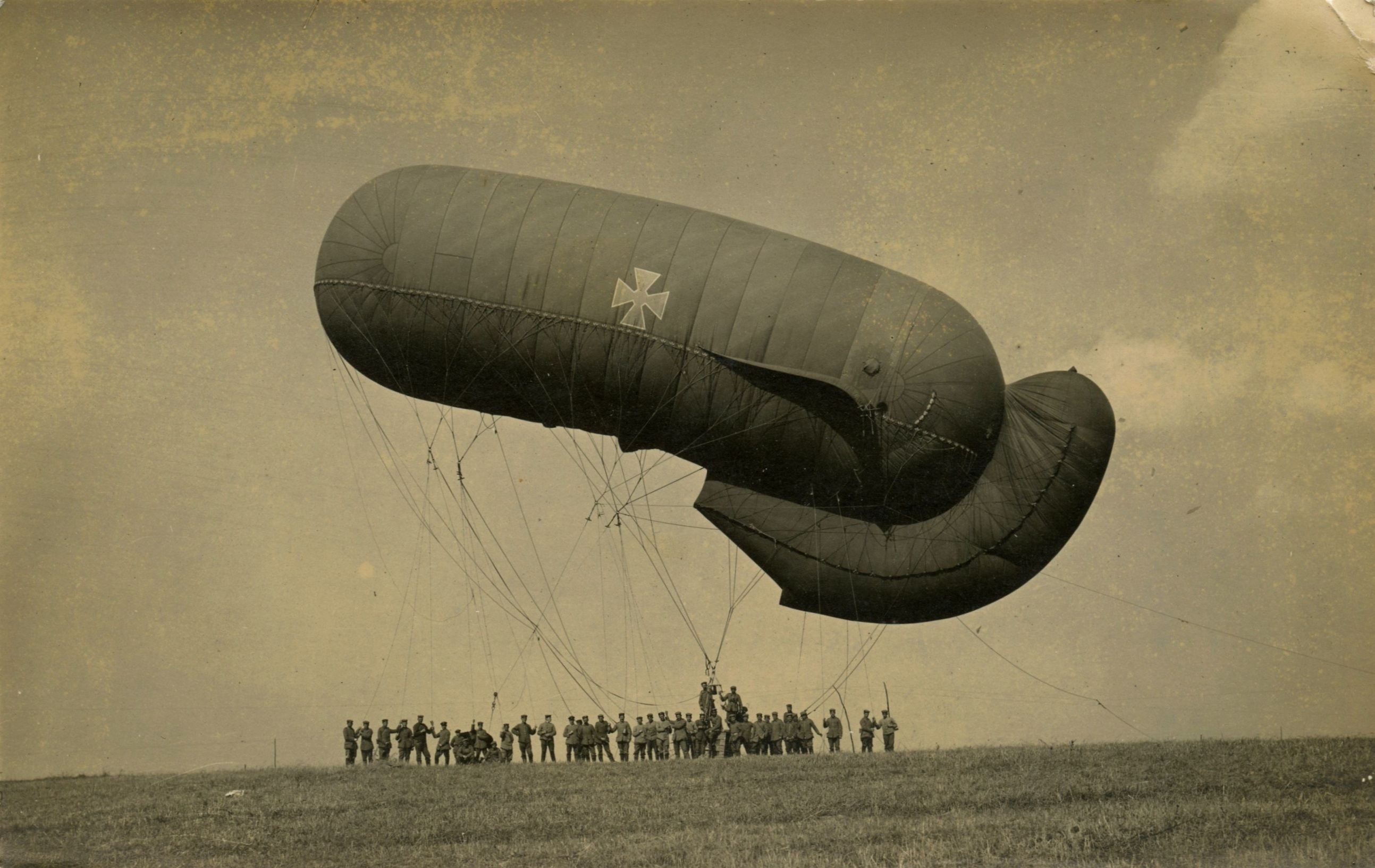
German observation balloon launching at Équancourt in the Somme (22 September 1916)

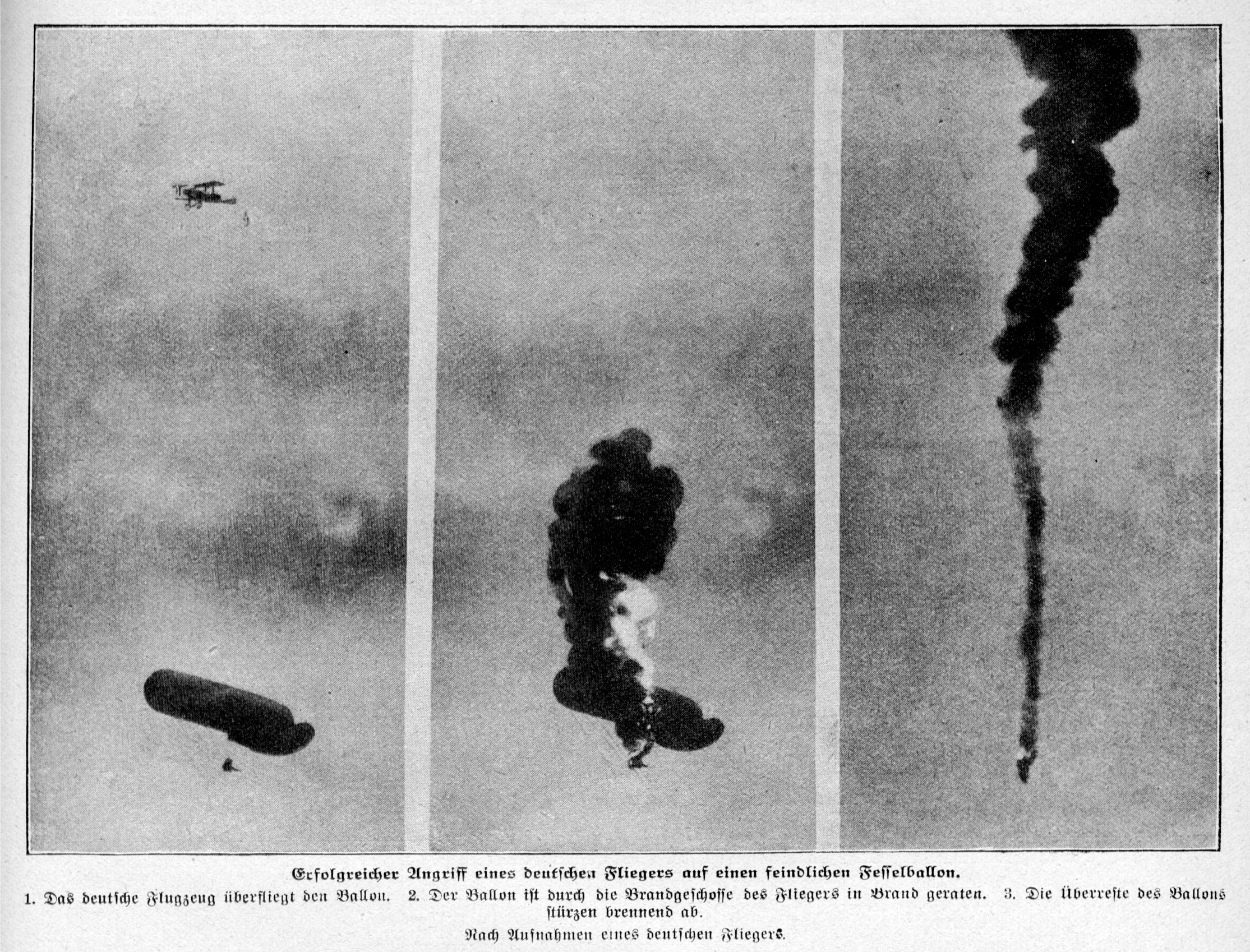
German war plane brings down a tethered kite balloon (1918)

World War I was the high point for the military use of observation balloons, which were extensively deployed by both sides. The British, despite their experience in late 1800s Africa, were behind developments and were still using spherical balloons. These were quickly replaced by versions, commonly referred to as kite balloons, which were flyable and could operate in more extreme weather conditions; at first, the German Parseval-Siegsfeld type balloon, and then French Caquot type dirigible. By World War I, artillery had developed to the point where it was capable of engaging targets beyond the visual range of a ground-based observer. Positioning artillery observers on balloons, generally a few miles behind the front lines and at altitude, allowed them to see targets at greater range than they could on the ground. This allowed the artillery to take advantage of its increased range.

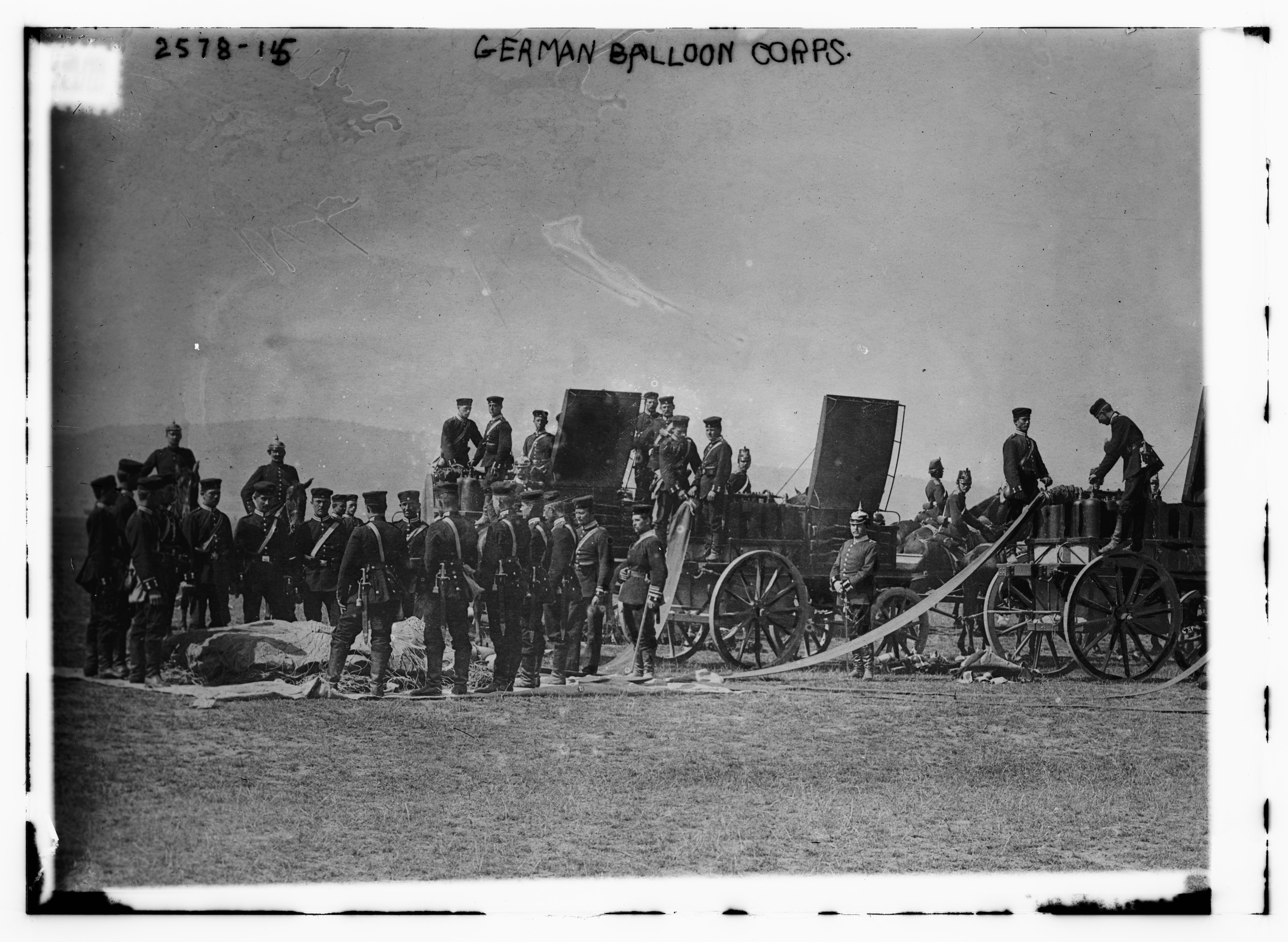
German Balloon Corps, 1910

Because of their importance as observation platforms, balloons were defended by anti-aircraft guns, groups of machine guns for low altitude defence, and patrolling fighter aircraft. Attacking a balloon was a risky venture but some pilots relished the challenge. The most successful were known as balloon busters, including such notables as Belgium's Willy Coppens, Germany's Friedrich Ritter von Röth, America's Frank Luke, and the Frenchmen Léon Bourjade, Michel Coiffard and Maurice Boyau. Many expert balloon busters were careful not to go below 1,000 feet (300 m) in order to avoid exposure to anti-aircraft guns and machine-guns.

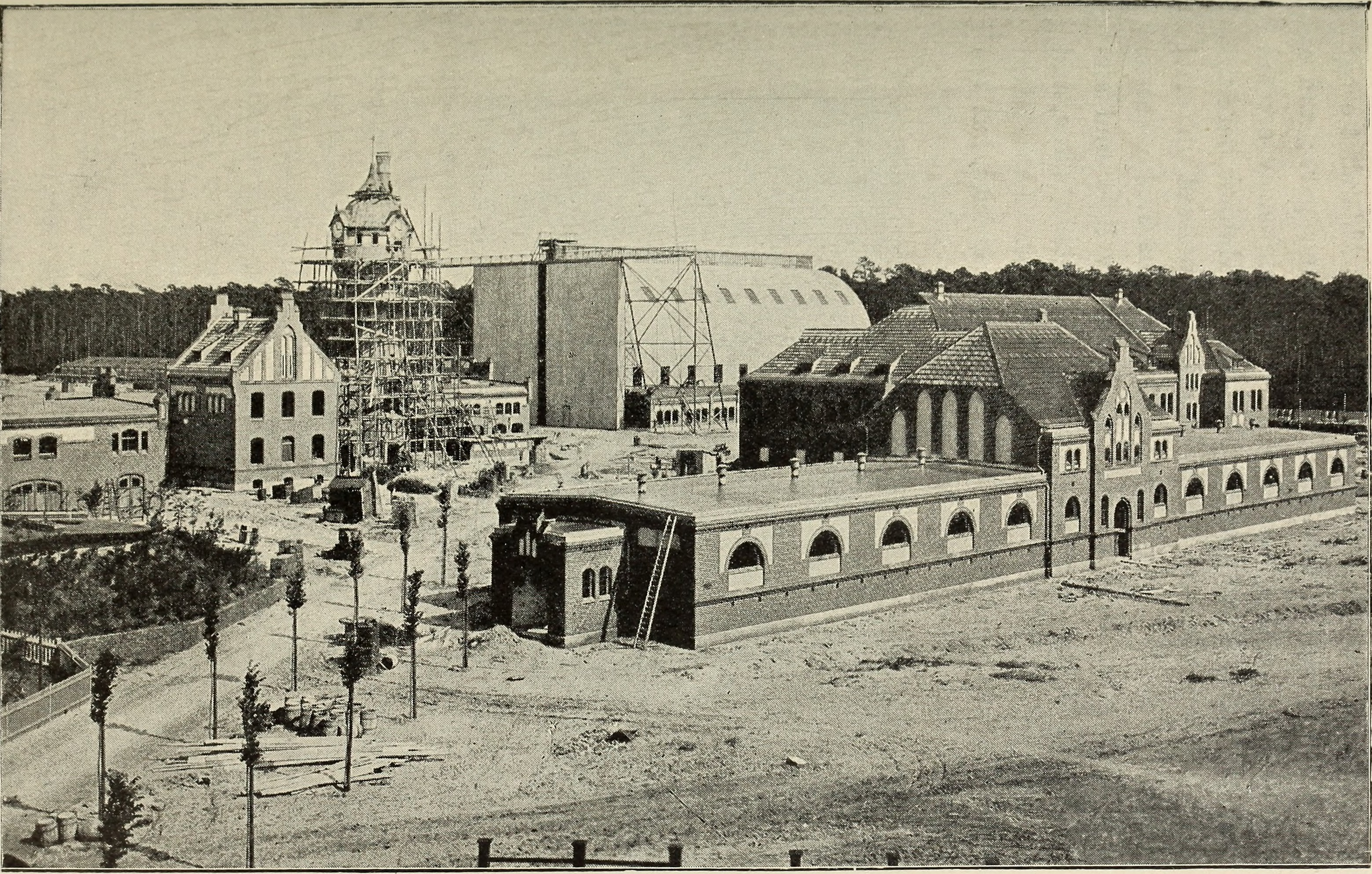
Prussian Balloon Corps Barracks at Tegel

World War I observation crews were the first to use parachutes, long before they were adopted by fixed wing aircrews. These were a primitive type, where the main part was in a bag suspended from the balloon, with the pilot only wearing a simple body harness around his waist, with lines from the harness attached to the main parachute in the bag. When the balloonist jumped, the main part of the parachute was pulled from the bag, with the shroud lines first, followed by the main canopy. This type of parachute was first adopted by the Germans and then later by the British and French for their observation balloon crews.

Observation balloons began to be used at sea for anti-submarine purposes towards the end of World War I.

The idiom "The balloon's going up!" as an expression for impending battle is derived from the very fact that an observation balloon's ascent likely signaled a preparatory bombardment for an offensive.

== World War II ==
Barrage balloons, widely known as "blimps," were used by the United Kingdom to intercept air attacks by German bombers and V-1 cruise missiles.

Japan used recently discovered high-altitude air currents to send fire balloons (or Fu-Go balloon bomb) carrying explosive payloads to the United States. About 300 made it across the Pacific, causing some property damage and at least six deaths. The US government called for a press blackout on all balloon incidents, fearing what might happen if the Japanese started using fu-go to deliver biological weapons.

Britain used free balloons in a number of ways including Operation Outward, which launched nearly 100,000 small balloons to drop incendiaries on German occupied Europe or to trail wires to short out electrical distribution cables.

Balloons also were used at sea, particularly by the US Navy for anti-submarine work.

The Soviet Union's Red Army used Observation Balloons for artillery spotting. Eight "Aeronautical Sections" existed and 19,985 observation flights were performed by Red Army balloonists during the war, clocking up 20,126 flight hours. 110 Soviet Observation Balloons were lost.

== Postwar ==
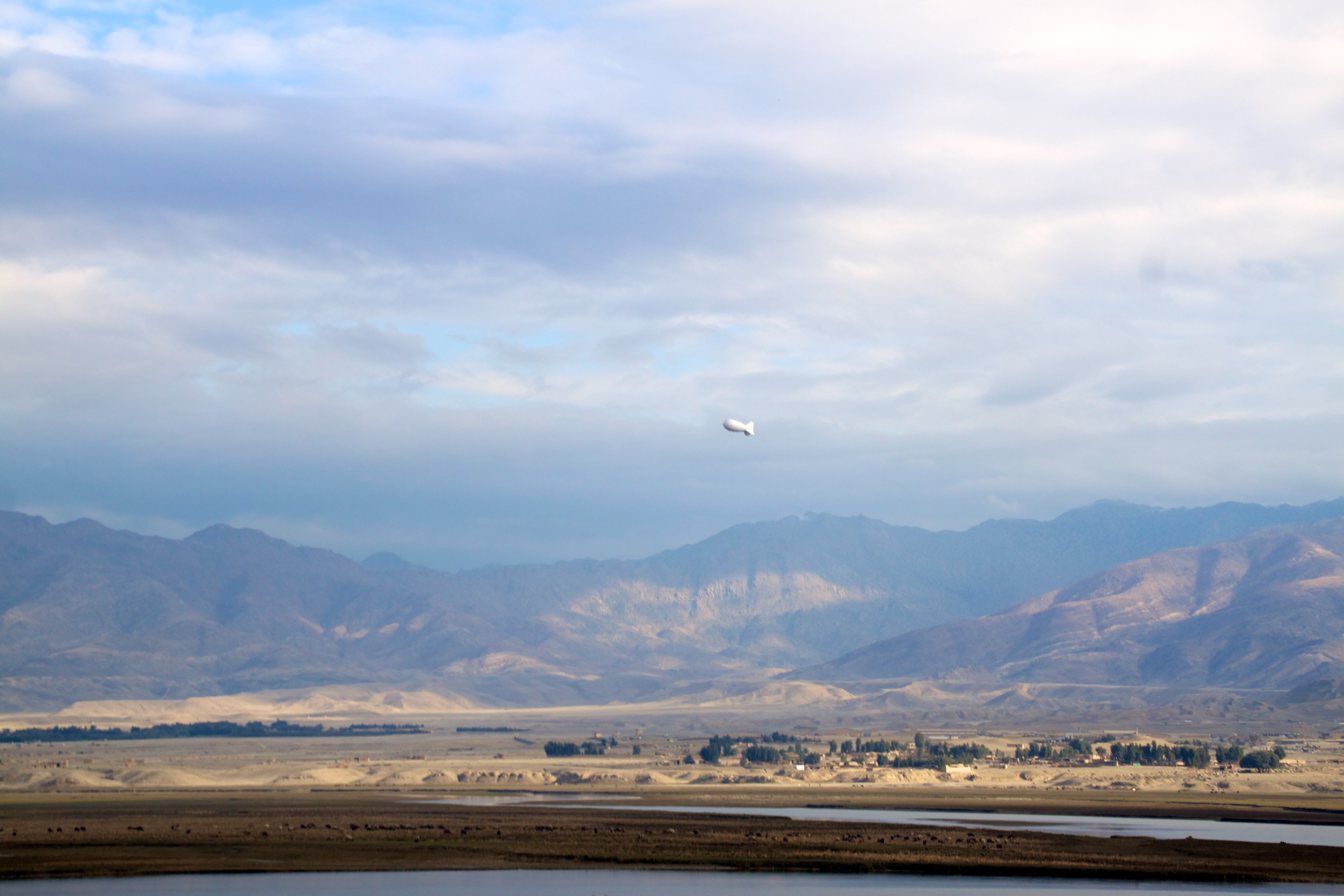
Observation balloon over Afghanistan, 2011

The US military developed high-altitude ballooning programs for nuclear detection and surveillance, such as Project Mogul (linked to the Roswell Incident), Project Genetrix and Project Moby Dick. They also worked on the E77 balloon bomb, refining the principles of the Japanese fire balloon explosive-delivery system.

Genetrix was a program run by the U.S. Air Force, Navy, and the Central Intelligence Agency during the 1950s. Disguised as meteorological research, it launched hundreds of surveillance balloons that flew over China, Eastern Europe, and the Soviet Union to take photographs and collect intelligence. Manufactured by the aeronautical division of General Mills, the balloons were about 20 stories tall, carried cameras and other electronic equipment, and reached altitudes ranging from 30,000 to over 60,000 feet, well above the reach of any contemporary fighter plane. Many were blown off course or shot down by Soviet air defenses. The overflights also drew protests from the target countries, while the United States defended its action. To increase effectiveness and minimize diplomatic blowback, it replaced the balloons with the newly developed U-2 reconnaissance plane, which was believed to be more difficult to detect.

Also during the 1950s, the Fulton surface-to-air recovery system (STARS) was developed for retrieving individuals from the ground using aircraft. It used an overall-type harness and a self-inflating balloon with an attached lift line.

Since 1996, the United States has invested over $2 billion in Joint Land Attack Cruise Missile Defense Elevated Netted Sensor System or JLENS, which built aerostats to track low-altitude targets. The project received attention for its balloons accidentally untethering from their moorings and the influence of industry lobbyists in keeping it alive.

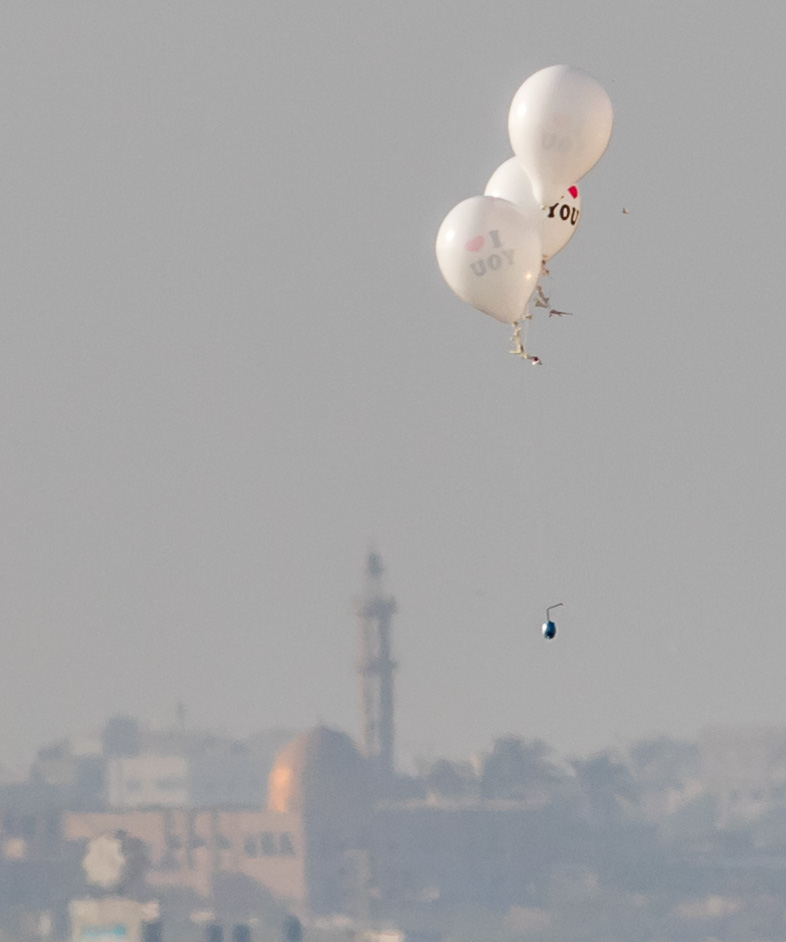
Helium party balloons bearing flammable materials launched from Bureij, Gaza Strip

Since the 2018 Gaza border protests, Palestinian militants have been launching incendiary balloons at Israel Since the beginning of May 2018, helium-filled incendiary balloons have been used alongside the kites. Gazan balloons are devised from helium-filled party balloons or condoms that are strung together, with flaming rags, other incendiary devices, or explosives strung below., On 25 August 2026 during the Gaza war, Israel warned Hamas that it will increase strikes on Gaza following concern over launches of kites, drones and balloons from the territory.as several kites were found in an Israeli community near the border with Gaza over the weekend, local media reported, threatening that "A balloon is treated like a kite, and a kite is treated like a drone, with or without explosives."

Aerostats have been used by US and coalition military forces in Iraq and in Afghanistan. In 2019, the United States Southern Command commissioned surveillance tests using 25 balloons made by Raven Industries across six states. Funded under project COLD STAR (Covert Long-Dwell Stratospheric Architecture) by the Pentagon, the balloons are stealthy, navigate using AI, and can harvest complex data. Initially created to locate narcotic traffickers, they were later transitioned into military service. Tom Karako, a fellow at the Center for Strategic and International Studies, said the balloons can serve as communication and datalink nodes, as trucks for intelligence, surveillance and reconnaissance (ISR) to track airborne targets, and as platforms for various weapons.

Around the same time, DARPA and several defense contractors were working on the Adaptable Lighter-Than-Air (ALTA) program, which aimed to make stratospheric balloon navigation more precise and reliable using doppler laser. The mature technology was transferred to the U.S. military in 2019.

Other similar prototypes have been in development in China and the United States.

In 2023, suspected surveillance balloons from China reportedly drifted off-course across North and Central America.

During its 2022 invasion of Ukraine, Russia launched balloons with corner reflectors to exhaust Ukrainian air defenses.

== See also ==
- Aerial warfare
  - History of aerial warfare
- Balloon (aeronautics)
- Balloon propaganda campaigns in Korea
- Barrage balloon
- Fort Omaha Balloon School – home of World War I training program
- Incendiary balloon – history of balloon bombs launched by Japan against the United States in World War II
- Observation balloon
- Operation Outward – British World War II programme to attack Germany by means of free-flying balloons
- Roswell incident - A military balloon crash that was claimed by the army to be a conventional weather balloon, gave rise to conspiracy theories of a flying saucer
- Thaddeus S. C. Lowe – father of military aerial reconnaissance in the United States
- Union Army Balloon Corps
- 2023 Chinese balloon incident
