= Paulli =

Paulli is a surname. Notable people with the surname include:

- Holger Simon Paulli (1810–1891), Danish conductor and composer
- Oliger Paulli (1644–1714), Danish merchant
- Simon Paulli (1603–1680), Danish physician and naturalist

== See also ==
- Pauli
- Paullin
