= Intrepid (balloon) =

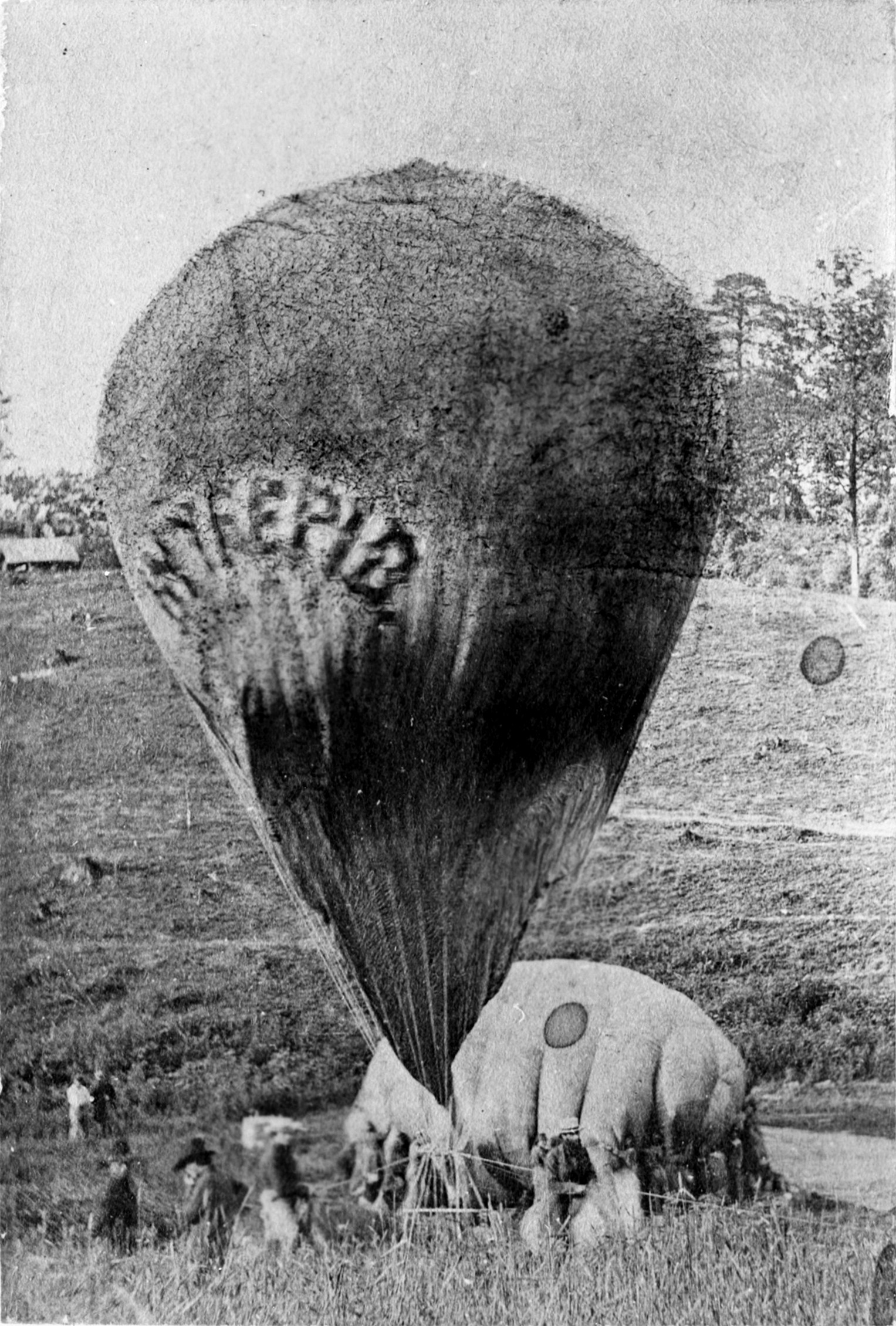
- Intrepid being cross-inflated from Constitution in a spur-of-the-moment attempt to get the larger balloon in the air to overlook the imminent Battle of Fair Oaks.

General information
- Type: Balloon
- National origin: USA
- Manufacturer: Union Army Balloon Corps

The Intrepid was a hydrogen gas balloon or aerostat built for use by the Union Army Balloon Corps for aerial reconnaissance purposes during the American Civil War. It was one of seven balloons constructed for the Balloon Corps and was one of the four larger balloons designed to make ascensions to higher elevations with a larger lift capacity for telegraph equipment and an operator. It was the balloon of choice for Chief Aeronaut Thaddeus Lowe overlooking the Battle of Fair Oaks.

The fateful flight over the Battle of Fair Oaks was instrumental in saving the fragmented army of Union Army General Samuel P. Heintzelman from what would have been a sure defeat at the hands of the Confederates. The Intrepid undergoing lengthy inflation was quickly hooked up to the spout of the smaller Constitution by means of a de-bottomed camp kettle by which the gas was transferred in shorter time to make the ascent.

In 1983, the U.S. Postal Service honored the Intrepid with a postage stamp.

== Design ==
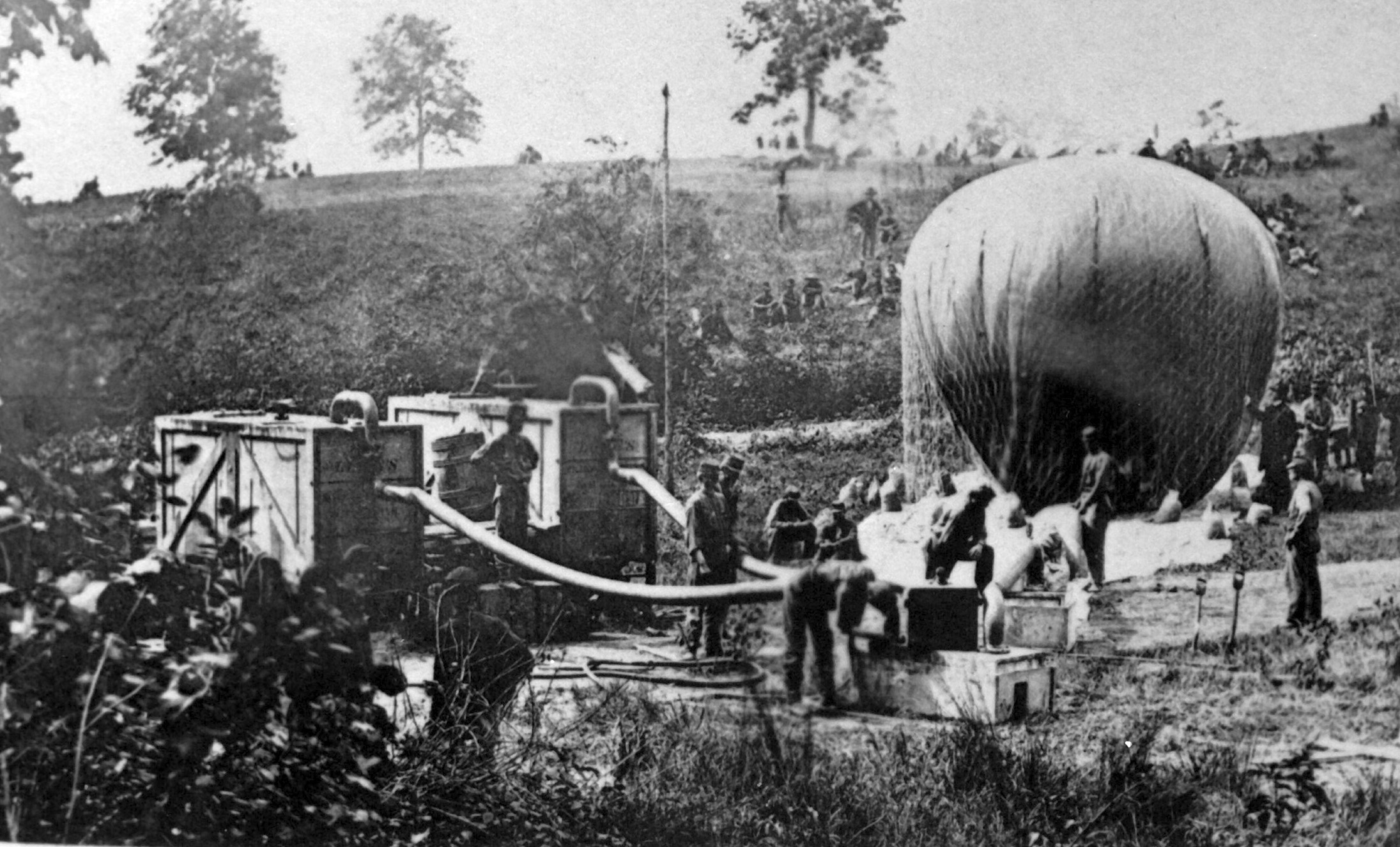
Typical field inflation from transportable hydrogen gas generators.

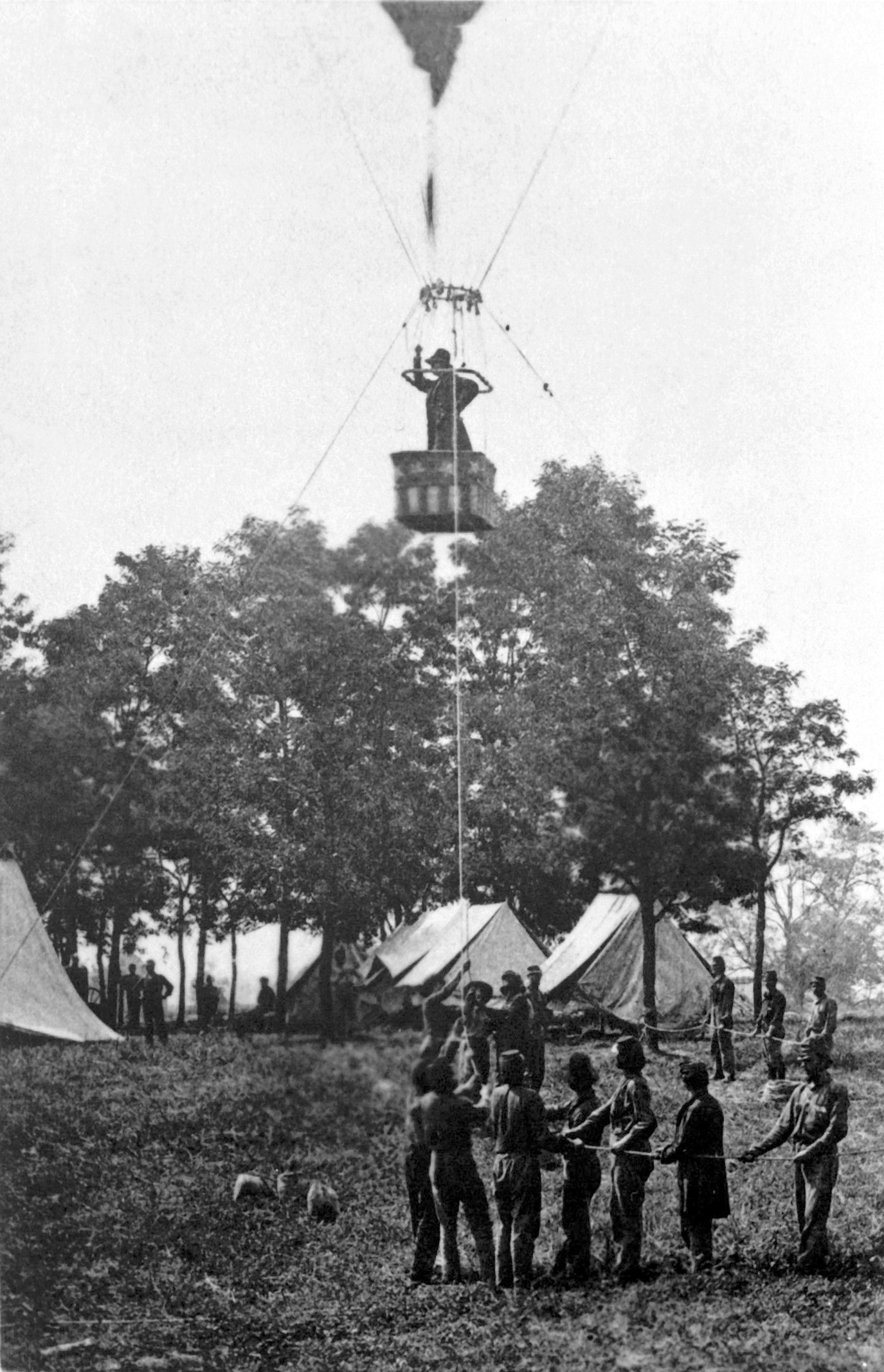
Thaddeus Lowe ascending in the Intrepid to observe the Battle of Fair Oaks.

The Intrepid had a capacity of 32,000 cubic feet of lifting gas (Hydrogen). It was supplied by hydrogen-generating wagons. These wagons, constructed by Lowe, reacted sulfuric acid with iron filings to produce hydrogen gas.

== See also ==
- History of military ballooning
- Union Army Balloon Corps
- Observation balloon
- Moored balloon
