= John LaMountain =

American balloonist

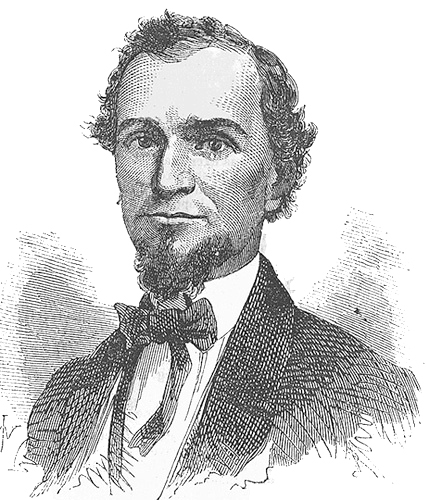
John LaMountain

John LaMountain (1830 Wayne County, New York – February 14, 1870 South Bend, Indiana) was a ballooning pioneer. He was privately contracted as an aerial observer by General Butler at Fort Monroe during the American Civil War and is accredited with having made the first report of useful intelligence on enemy activity. Afterwards he worked a short assignment with the Union Army Balloon Corps.

== Early life and ballooning ==
LaMountain had little education, and on the early death of his father he became the sole support of his mother. When a young man he was successful in making several minor ascensions. Known more for his overbearingly contentious mannerisms, and a propensity to ride the coat tails of more successful balloonists, LaMountain was not considered relevant to the science of ballooning.

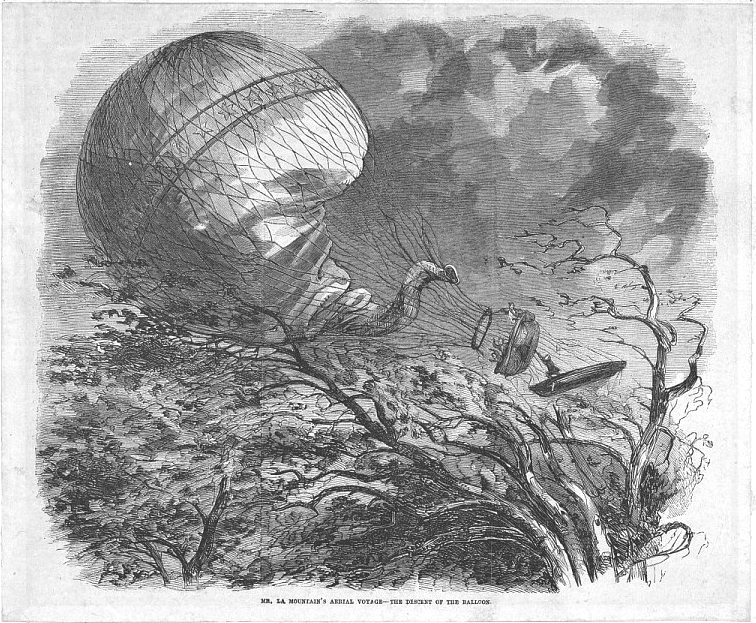
John LaMountain's balloon voyage with John Wise and Gager from St. Louis to Rochester, 1859, the descent of the balloon

In 1859 he was invited to join with the more senior and prominent, and just as sanctimonious, balloonist John Wise in an attempt to cross the Atlantic Ocean in Wise's mammoth aerostat appropriately named Atlantic. The ascent was made from St. Louis, Missouri, on July 1, with Wise, LaMountain and several guest passengers. They passed over the states of Illinois and Indiana during the night, reaching Ohio by morning. The balloon then passed across Lake Erie into New York, and over Lake Ontario, where it became entangled in a sudden storm and was forced to crash-land at Henderson, New York. The time occupied in making this journey was nineteen hours and fifty minutes, and the distance traversed 1,150 miles (1,850 km), or 826 in a straight line. Unfortunately the balloon was badly damaged and the two men's partnership dissolved upon which opportunity LaMountain took possession of the Atlantic.

In September 1859, La Mountain made an ascension with the Atlantic, along with newspaperman John Haddock, from Watertown, New York across Minnesota and Michigan. Again the weather worked against the flight. The ascension was made when the temperature was 84 °F., but on reaching a height of 3½ miles it had sunk to 18 °F. As night came on, the balloon had drifted over the Canadian wilderness, and a partial descent was made to “tie up” until daylight. The two men attempted to fly northward, but unwilling to continue they set down permanently and spent the next four days wandering in the wilderness with no provisions. They were rescued by lumbermen who helped them find their way back.

== Civil War Days ==
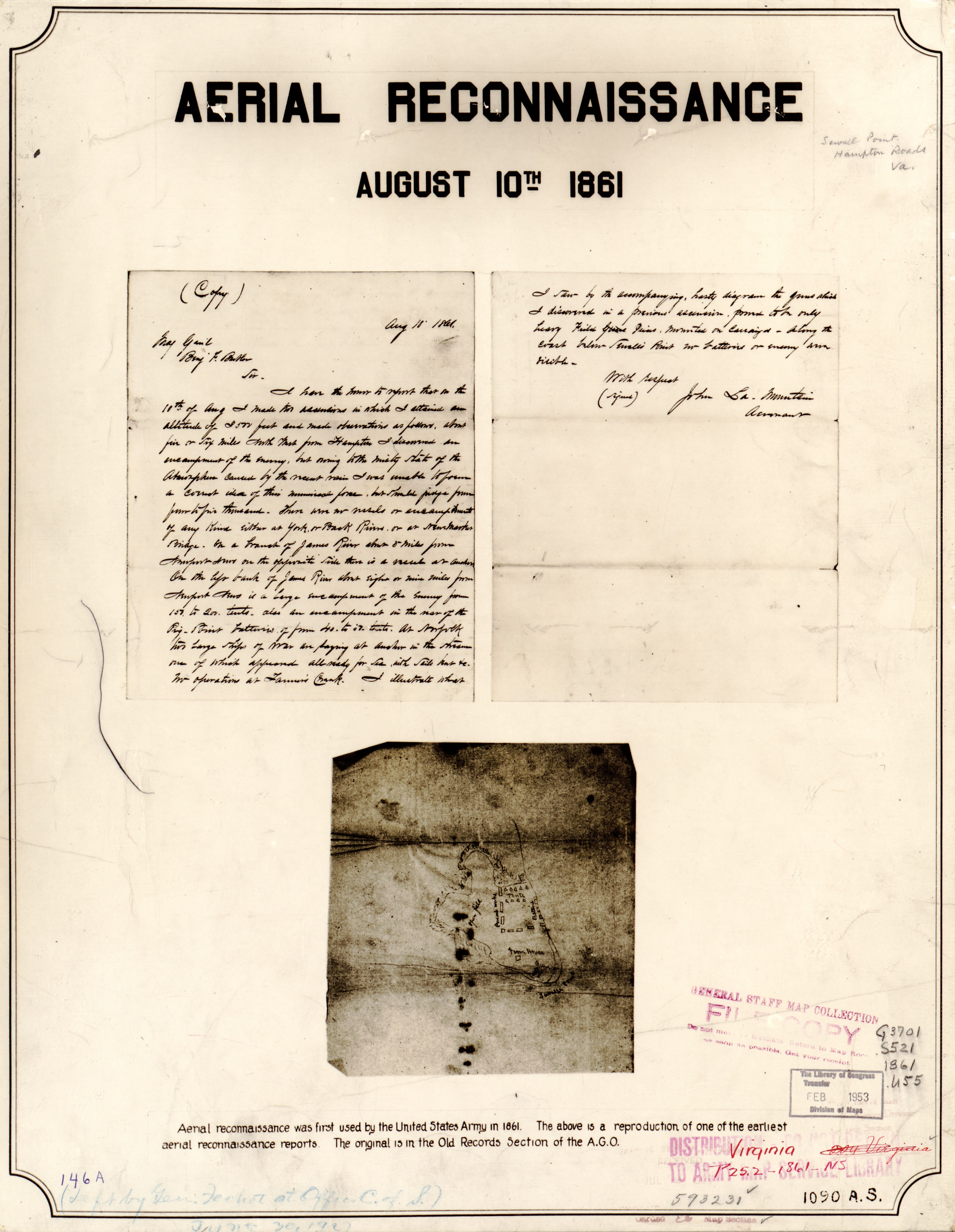
An aerial reconnaissance report of August 10th, 1861 for Sewells Point, Virginia

In 1861 LaMountain headed for Washington in hopes of being able to land the job as Chief Aeronaut for the Union Army. The position was being sought by others including John Wise, Thaddeus S. C. Lowe, and the two Allen Brothers Ezra and James. Though LaMountain never caught the eye of the various cabinet members, he did go to work for Major General Benjamin Butler at Fort Monroe. He was using the old balloon Atlantic until he could be provided with a newer balloon called the Saratoga. Eventually he lost that balloon in a windstorm. LaMountain is accredited with having made the first report of enemy movement derived from observations from an aerial station.

On August 3, 1861, while on the James River, LaMountain made an ascent from the deck of the steam tug Fanny to observe Confederate positions, making the Fanny a balloon carrier.

When Butler was relieved of command of Fort Monroe, LaMountain also lost his position and was assigned to the Union Army Balloon Corps under Chief Aeronaut Thaddeus S. C. Lowe. The contentious LaMountain fought Lowe at every turn in an attempt to discredit him and take over the position he had vied for. Lowe had already found great favor in General George McClellan, and when the bickering between the two men had reached heights of public controversy and lowered morale among the aeronautic corps, McClellan dismissed LaMountain from service, and he was not publicly heard from again.

== See also ==
- William Hyde (journalist), made Missouri-New York balloon trip with LaMountain
