= William Paullin =

American balloonist

William Paullin (3 April 1812, in Philadelphia – 1 December 1871) was an American balloonist.

== Biography ==
At the age of twenty-one he began the construction of his first balloon, and in August 1833, he made a trial trip from Philadelphia, inflating with hydrogen gas, followed by numerous ascents, and on 26 July 1837, made a private effort from the Philadelphia gas works with the view of testing the practicability of using coal gas for balloon purposes. He succeeded, and was thus the first, in this country at least, to use illuminating gas for balloon purposes.

In September 1841, he sailed for Valparaíso, Chile, and he made numerous ascensions during his stay in South America. On one occasion he rose from Santiago and crossed the volcano, being compelled to ascend to such a height as to distress him severely. The heat was so great as to endanger the balloon, while the fumes that arose threatened him with suffocation. Paullin also made ascensions in Cuba, Haiti, Puerto Rico, and Mexico.

After an absence of six years, he returned to the United States, and made many ascents from the western states, and some in the east. During the American Civil War, he was connected with the Union Army, making his last ascension under General Joseph Hooker. He then resigned, and became a photographer. His intellect was affected for some time before his death.
