= Enterprise (balloon) =

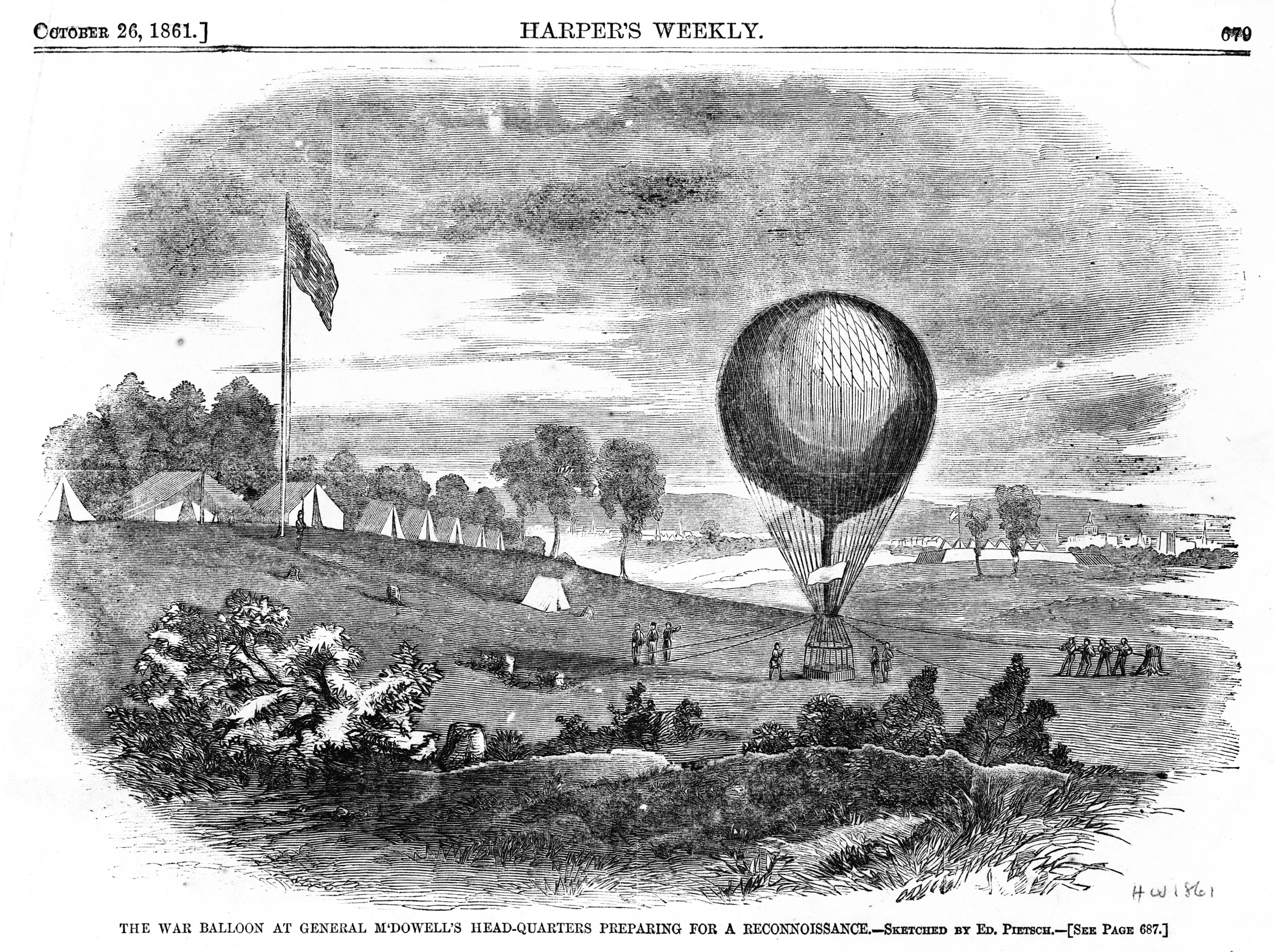
Lowe's Enterprise in Harper's Weekly, for a reconnaissance mission at General McDowell's headquarters.

The Enterprise was a gas inflated aerostat built by Prof. Thaddeus S. C. Lowe along with his father Clovis Lowe in 1858. It was the second balloon built by Lowe at his Hoboken, N.J. facility and named with the express approval of his wife Leontine because of the money and time they put into creating it. The Enterprise was built with Indian silk, lightweight cording, and Lowe's patent (recipe kept secret) varnish which could keep the balloon envelope gassed up for as long as two weeks.

== Cincinnati to South Carolina ==
The Enterprise was one in a set of smaller balloons taken to Cincinnati in March 1861 for use as a pre-flight test for a proposed transatlantic flight planned to take place in June 1861. Lowe had already made a successful test flight in his super-gigantic balloon, the City of New York (renamed Great Western), in June 1860. However, his attempts to take off on a transatlantic attempt in September were thwarted by weather, which damaged the balloon to an extent the attempt would have to be delayed until the next spring. Prof. Joseph Henry of the Smithsonian Institution advised Lowe to take test flight from a point west to the eastern seaboard. This would maintain the interest in his investors. Lowe decided on Cincinnati.

Lowe's balloon used the normal easterly winds, below the jetstream. It was his intent to wait for perfect conditions, that is, a wind blowing west through which he would fly and catch the easterly wind home. It was a month before the conditions came about. Lowe was hailed from a dinner being held in his honor to begin inflation. At 4 a.m. on April 19, 1861, Lowe boarded the Enterprise with a container of hot coffee wrapped in a blanket, another of water, and a batch of freshly printed Cincinnati newspapers which would be proof of his flight should he succeed.

Lowe ascended through the west wind and into the dark. By morning he was spotted over Kentucky. He had attained altitudes in excess of 20,000 feet according to his instrumentation, and had flown some 900 circuitous miles to a landing in Unionville, South Carolina. There he was taken under house arrest as a Yankee spy, and it was a few days deliberating his fate until which time a local college professor could vouch for Lowe's work as a scientist. Lowe was given safe passage back to Cincinnati to pick up his balloons. It was at this point that he was asked to, and ultimately offered his services to the Union Army.

== Washington, D.C. to Bull Run ==
Lowe was called to Washington, D.C. by the Secretary of the Treasury Salmon P. Chase. By June 11 Lowe had an audience with Lincoln and offered a demonstration of his balloon. With the use of a telegraph key and operator, Lowe ascended in the Enterprise 500 feet over the White House and transmitted:

Balloon Enterprise in the Air
To His Excellency, Abraham Lincoln
President of the United States

Dear Sir:

From this point of observation we command an extent of our country nearly fifty miles in diameter. I have the pleasure of sending you this first telegram ever dispatched from an aerial station, and acknowledging indebtedness to your encouragement for the opportunity of demonstrating the availability of the science of aeronautics in the service of the country.

I am, Your Excellency's obedient servant,
T.S.C. Lowe

Lowe was held up in Washington for a time while decisions on the use of balloons were being made. At the same time, there were other applicants seeking the position of Chief Aeronaut. Lowe tried to convince the military that special duty balloons would need to be built for military purposes and that even his own Enterprise was not up to the task. So as not to shrug from his purpose at hand, Lowe took the Enterprise out with General McDowell's army to the site of the Battle of First Bull Run.

In his first free flight demonstration, Lowe's landing was rebuffed by Union soldiers who could not make out any type of military insignia for Lowe and his balloon — as he had none — and was forced to land behind enemy lines. Fortunately he was rescued before the enemy could find him. In this escapade the Enterprise was badly damaged, but Lowe was finally given orders to build a proper balloon.

Eventually the Enterprise was put back into light service with Lowe's father, Clovis, and assistant Capt. John Dickenson (Navy retired) in Washington, D.C. After Lowe was able to build seven proper military balloons, the Enterprise was decommissioned.

== Legacy ==
L class blimp Enterprise under US Navy designation L-5 was one of five Goodyear commercial blimps pressed into World War II service. The others were the Resolute (L-4), Reliance (L-6), Rainbow (L-7), and Ranger (L-8),
