= Comet Swift =

Comet Swift or Swift's Comet, may refer to any of the 9 comets discovered by American astronomer, Lewis A. Swift, below:

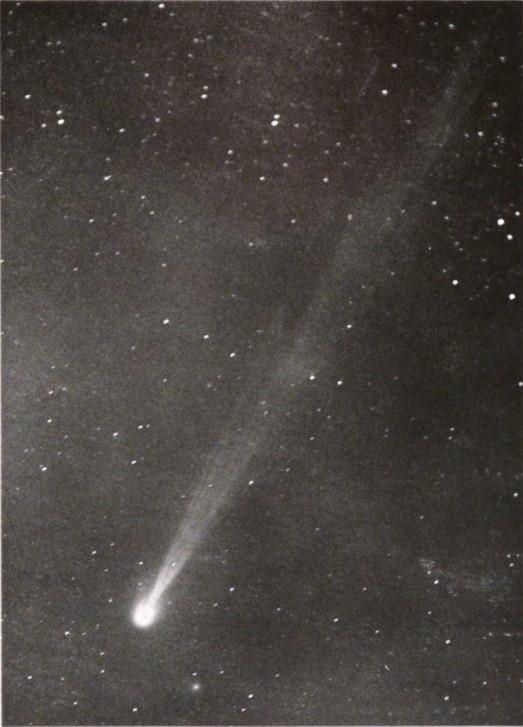
C/1892 E1 (Swift)

- C/1877 G2 (Swift)
- C/1878 N1 (Swift)
- C/1879 M1 (Swift)
- C/1881 J1 (Swift)
- C/1881 W1 (Swift)
- C/1892 E1 (Swift)
- D/1895 Q1 (Swift)
- C/1896 G1 (Swift)
- C/1899 E1 (Swift)

It may also be an incomplete reference to a comet he have co-discovered with other astronomers. These include:

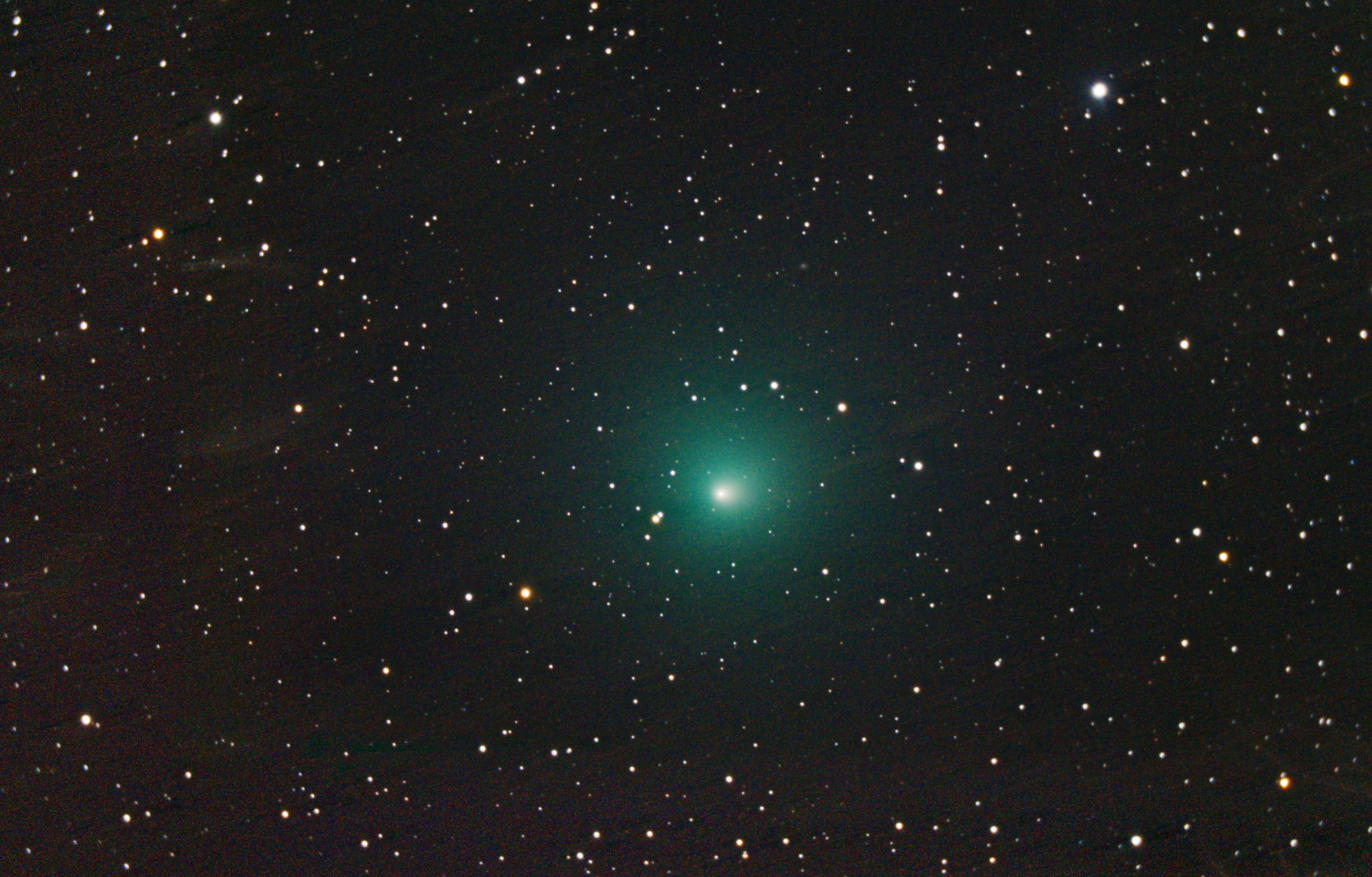
64P/Swift–Gehrels

- 11P/Tempel–Swift–LINEAR
- 64P/Swift–Gehrels
- 109P/Swift–Tuttle
- C/1883 D1 (Brooks–Swift)

In addition, his son, Edward D. Swift, discovered one comet below:

- 54P/de Vico–Swift–NEAT
