= NGC 806 =

Spiral galaxy in the constellation Cetus

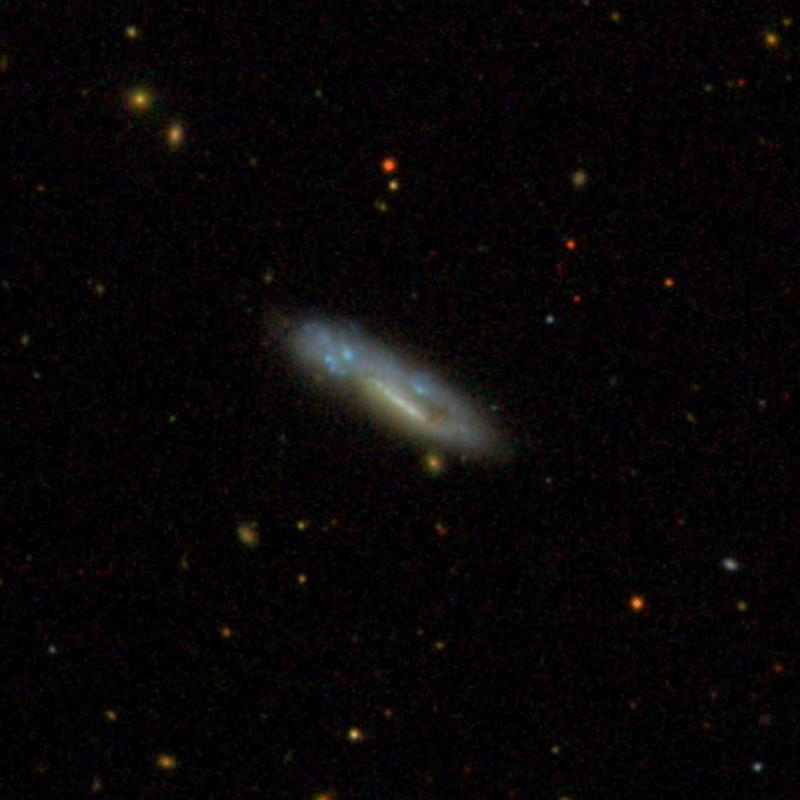
- NGC 806 (SDSS)

Observation data (J2000.0 epoch)
- Constellation: Cetus
- Right ascension: 02^{h} 03^{m} 31.15^{s}
- Declination: −09° 56′ 00.15″
- Redshift: 0.013156
- Heliocentric radial velocity: 3944 ± 9 km/s
- Distance: 166 Mly
- Apparent magnitude (V): 14.10
- Apparent magnitude (B): 14.80

Characteristics
- Type: Scd pec? HII
- Apparent size (V): 1.2 x 0.4

Other designations
- PGC 7835, MCG -2-6-21

NGC 806 is a spiral galaxy approximately 166 million light-years away from Earth in the constellation Cetus. It was discovered by American astronomer Lewis A. Swift on November 1, 1886 with the 16" refractor at Warner Observatory.

== Interaction with galaxy PGC 3100716 ==
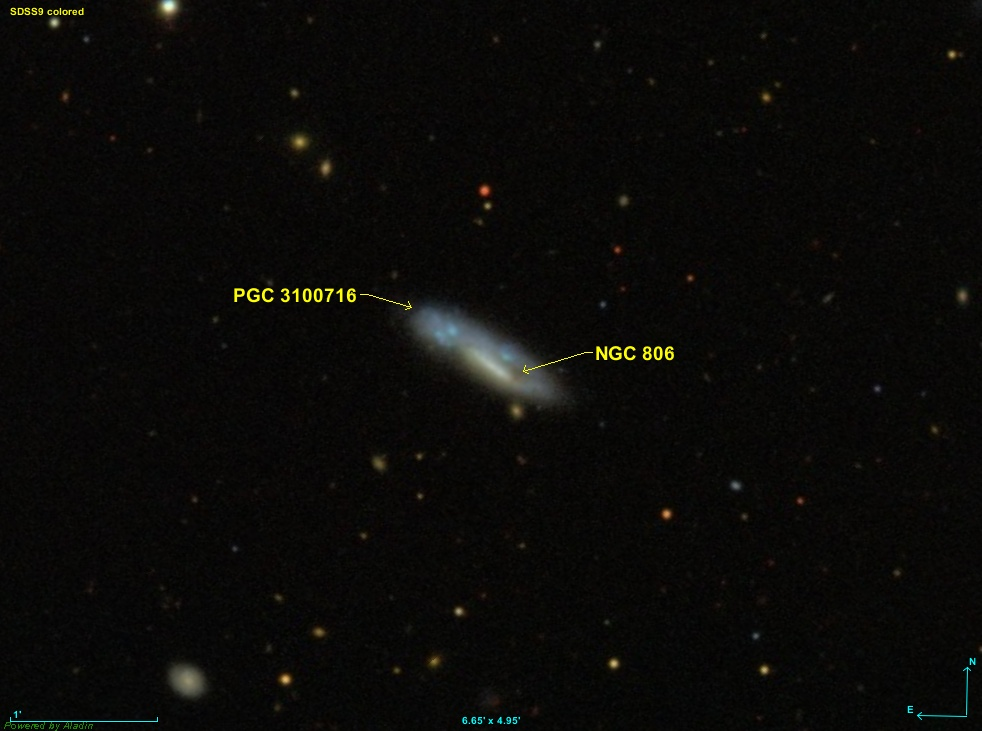
NGC 806 and PGC 3100716 (SDSS)

NGC 806 and PGC 3100716 form a pair of galaxies in gravitational interaction. These two galaxies are either colliding or are the result of a collision.

PGC 3100716 is a spiral galaxy with an apparent size of 0.09 by 0.08 arcmin. It was not included in the original version of the New General Catalogue, and was later added as NGC 806-2.

== See also ==
- List of NGC objects (1–1000)
