= NGC 6685 =

Galaxy in the constellation Lyra

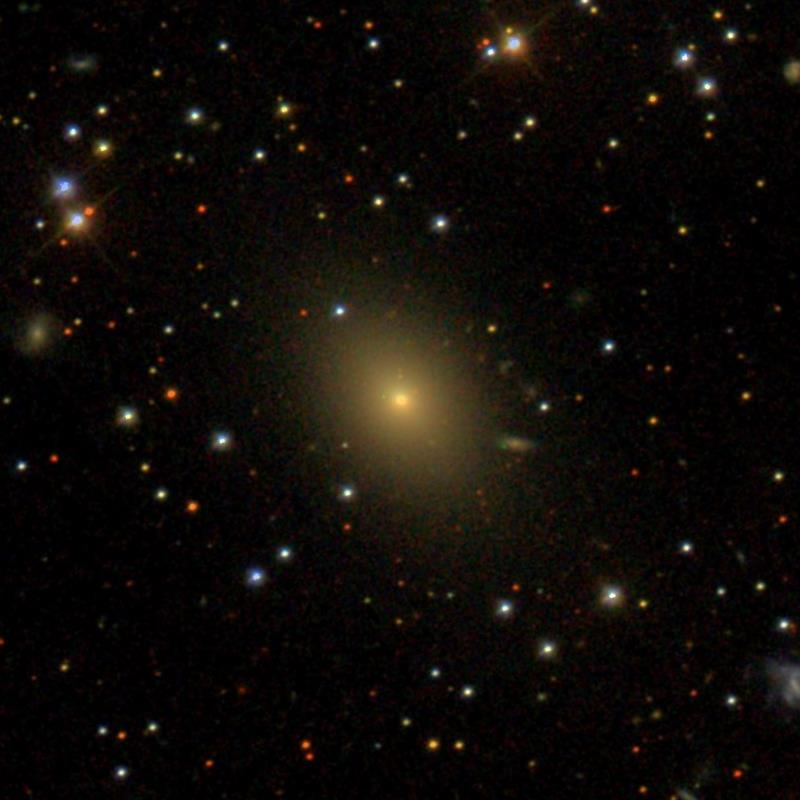
- NGC 6685 imaged by Sloan Digital Sky Survey

Observation data (J2000 epoch)
- Constellation: Lyra
- Right ascension: 18^{h} 39^{m} 58.6199^{s}
- Declination: +39° 58′ 54.581″
- Redshift: 0.021905
- Heliocentric radial velocity: 6567 ± 36 km/s
- Distance: 309.4 ± 21.8 Mly (94.87 ± 6.68 Mpc)
- Apparent magnitude (V): 13.4

Characteristics
- Type: S0^-?
- Size: ~141,400 ly (43.34 kpc) (estimated)
- Apparent size (V): 1.1′ × 0.9′

Other designations
- 2MASX J18395865+3958541, UGC 11317, MCG +07-38-015, PGC 62220, CGCG 228-021

NGC 6685 is an elliptical galaxy in the constellation of Lyra. Its velocity with respect to the cosmic microwave background is 6432 ± 37 km/s, which corresponds to a Hubble distance of 94.87 ± 6.68 Mpc (~310 million light-years). It was discovered by American astronomer Edward Swift on 29 May 1887.

== Supernovae ==
Two supernovae have been observed in NGC 6685:

- SN 2006bq (Type Ia, mag. 15.8) was discovered by Tim Puckett and A. Pelloni on 23 April 2006.
- SN 2023ndu (Type Ia, mag. 18.4555) was discovered by the Automatic Learning for the Rapid Classification of Events (ALeRCE) on 14 July 2023.

== See also ==
- List of NGC objects (6001–7000)
