= NGC 768 =

Galaxy in the constellation Cetus

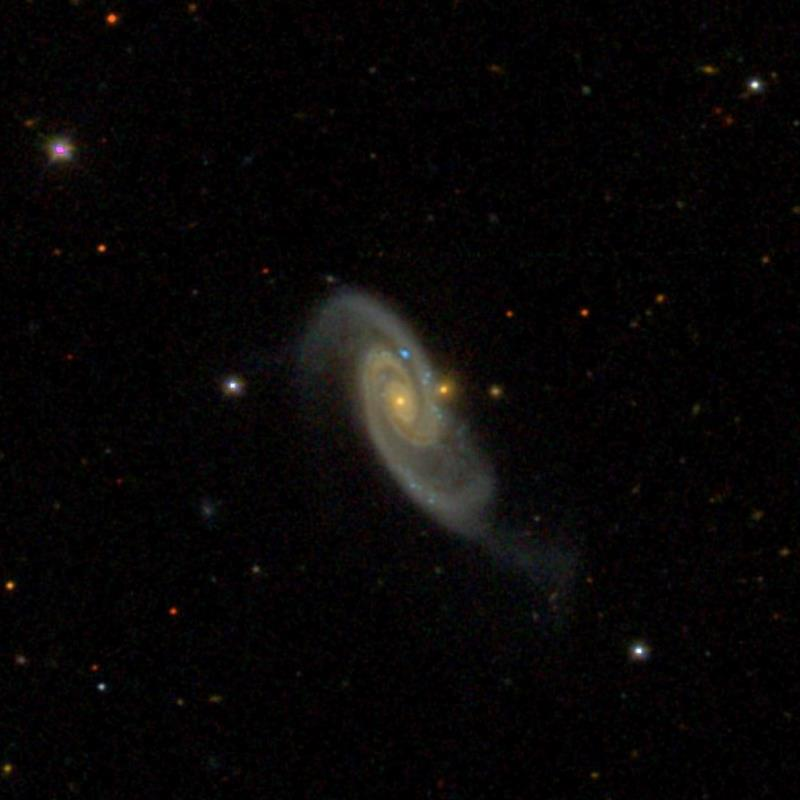
- SDSS image of NGC 768

Observation data (J2000 epoch)
- Constellation: Cetus
- Right ascension: 01^{h} 58^{m} 40.953^{s}
- Declination: +00° 31′ 45.17″
- Redshift: 0.02334
- Heliocentric radial velocity: 6916 km/s
- Distance: 260.3 Mly (79.80 Mpc)
- Apparent magnitude (B): 14.3

Characteristics
- Type: SB(r)bc:

Other designations
- UGC 1457, MCG +00-06-016, PGC 7465

NGC 768 is a barred spiral galaxy located in the constellation Cetus about 314 million light years from the Milky Way. It was discovered by the American astronomer Lewis Swift in 1885.

== See also ==
- List of NGC objects (1–1000)
