= NGC 920 =

Barred spiral galaxy in the constellation Andromeda

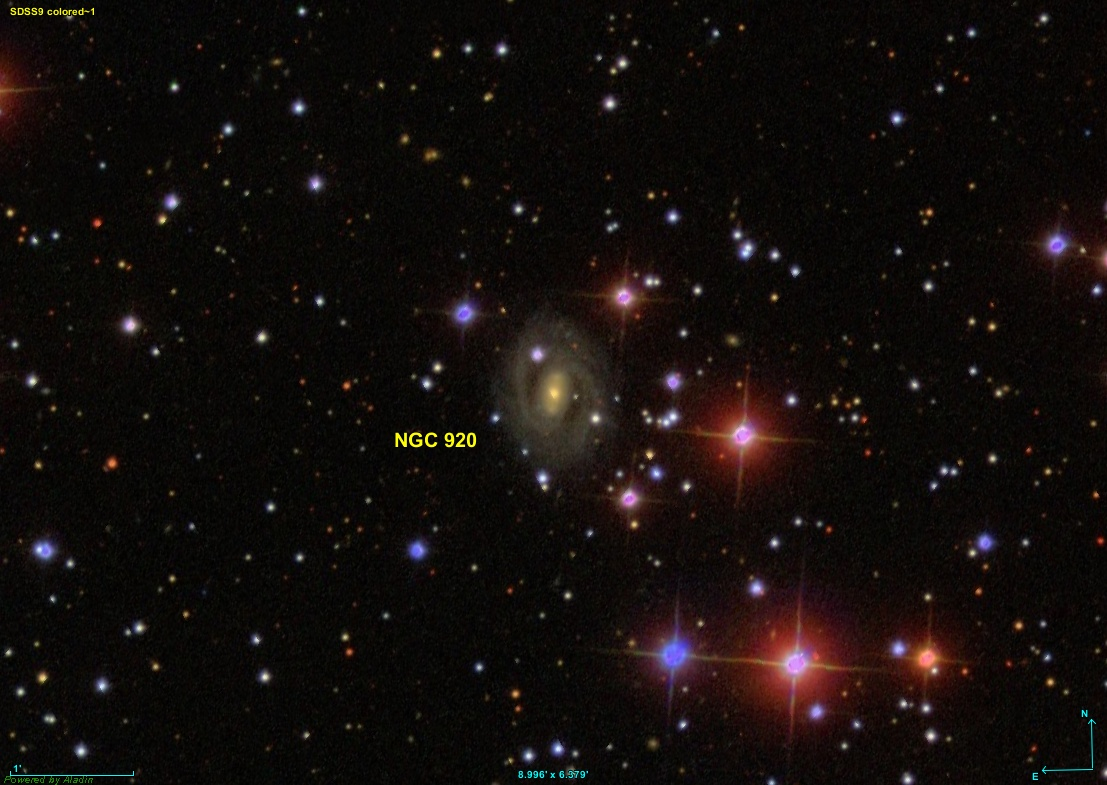
- SDSS image of NGC 920

Observation data (J2000 epoch)
- Constellation: Andromeda
- Right ascension: 02^{h} 27^{m} 51.794^{s}
- Declination: +45° 56′ 49.58″
- Redshift: 0.020886
- Heliocentric radial velocity: 6196 km/s
- Distance: 288.4 ± 20.2 Mly (88.43 ± 6.20 Mpc)
- Apparent magnitude (B): 15.6

Characteristics
- Type: (R')SB(s)ab

Other designations
- UGC 1920, MCG +08-05-011, PGC 9377

NGC 920 is a barred spiral galaxy in the constellation Andromeda. The celestial object was discovered on September 11, 1885 by the American astronomer Lewis A. Swift.

== See also ==
- List of NGC objects (1–1000)
