= NGC 4544 =

Galaxy in the constellation Virgo

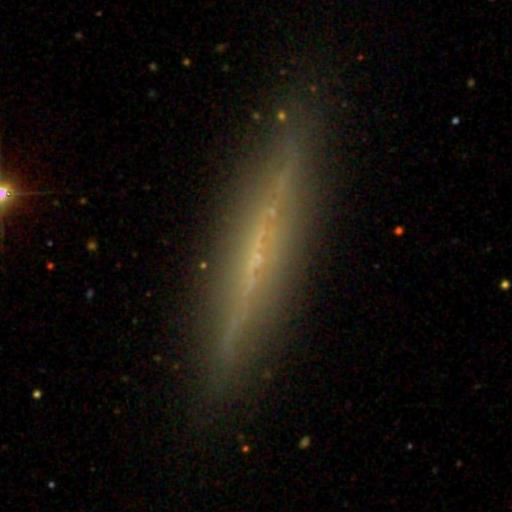
- SDSS image of NGC 4544

Observation data (J2000 epoch)
- Constellation: Virgo
- Right ascension: 12^{h} 35^{m} 36.6^{s}
- Declination: 03° 02′ 04″
- Redshift: 0.003849
- Heliocentric radial velocity: 1154 km/s
- Distance: 52 Mly
- Group or cluster: Virgo Cluster
- Apparent magnitude (V): 14.00

Characteristics
- Type: SB0/a?
- Size: ~44,000 ly (estimated)
- Apparent size (V): 2.0 x 0.6

Other designations
- CGCG 42-168, MCG 1-32-110, PGC 41958, UGC 7756, VCC 1624

NGC 4544 is an edge-on spiral galaxy located about 52 million light-years away in the constellation Virgo. NGC 4544 was discovered by astronomer Edward Swift on April 27, 1887. NGC 4544 is a member of the Virgo Cluster.

== See also ==
- List of NGC objects (4001–5000)
