= NGC 437 =

Galaxy in the constellation Pisces

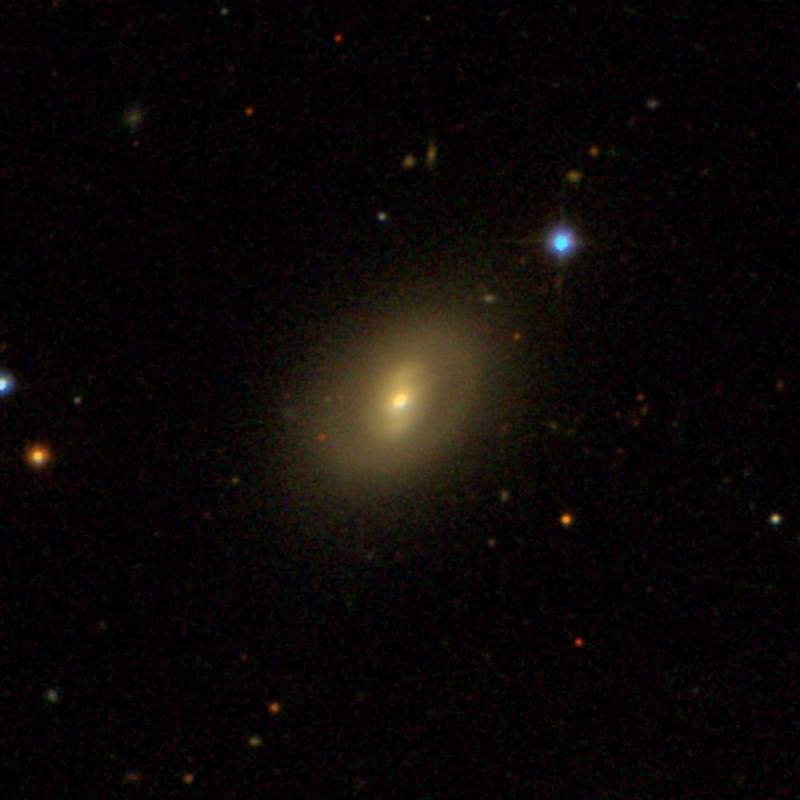
- SDSS view of NGC 437

Observation data (J2000 epoch)
- Constellation: Pisces
- Right ascension: 01^{h} 14^{m} 22.3^{s}
- Declination: +05° 55′ 37″
- Redshift: 0.017649
- Heliocentric radial velocity: 5,291 km/s
- Apparent magnitude (V): 13.79
- Absolute magnitude (V): -20.66

Characteristics
- Type: S0/a
- Apparent size (V): 1.3' × 1.0'

Other designations
- UGC 788, CGCG 411-009, MCG +01-04-005, 2MASX J01142229+0555366, PGC 4464.

NGC 437 is a lenticular galaxy of type S0/a located in the constellation Pisces. It was discovered on October 22, 1886, by Lewis Swift. It was described by Dreyer as "pretty faint, very small, round, faint star to northwest."
