= NGC 155 =

Lenticular galaxy in the constellation Cetus

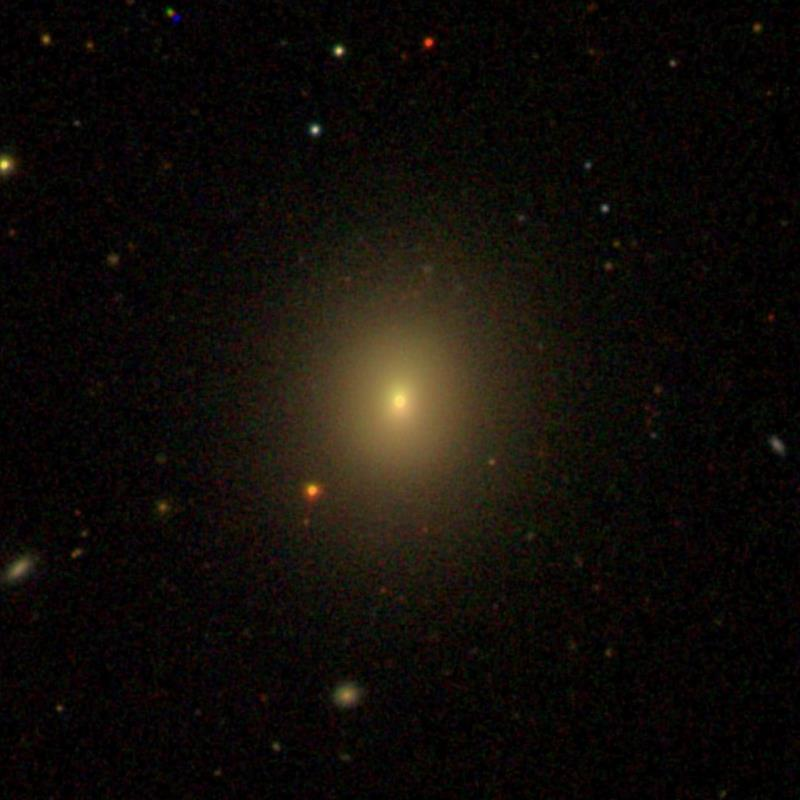
- SDSS view of NGC 155

Observation data (J2000 epoch)
- Constellation: Cetus
- Right ascension: 00^{h} 34^{m} 40.113^{s}
- Declination: −10° 45′ 59.35″
- Redshift: 0.020714
- Heliocentric radial velocity: 6210
- Distance: 248.37 ± 41.74 Mly (76.150 ± 12.799 Mpc)
- Apparent magnitude (B): 13

Characteristics
- Type: S0^{0} pec
- Size: 125,600 ly (38,510 pc) (Note: RC3 D_25 (blue) values used.)
- Apparent size (V): 1.38′ × 1.06′

Other designations
- MGC -02-02-055, PGC 2076

NGC 155 is a lenticular galaxy in the constellation Cetus. It was discovered on September 1, 1886, by Lewis A. Swift.
