= NGC 1819 =

Lenticular galaxy in the Orion constellation

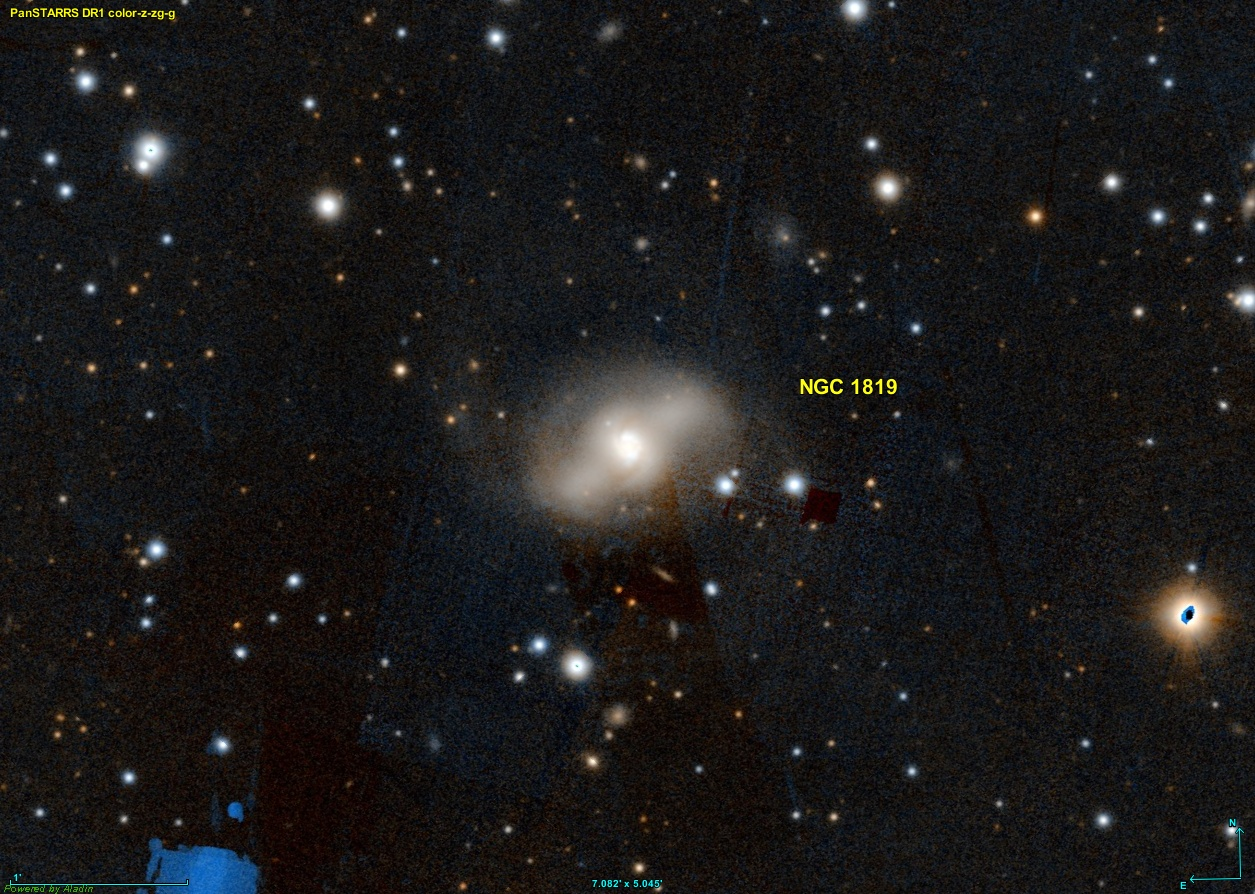
- Pan-STARRS image of NGC 1819

Observation data (J2000 epoch)
- Constellation: Orion
- Right ascension: 05^{h} 11^{m} 46.150^{s}
- Declination: +05° 12′ 02.21″
- Redshift: 0.014880±0.000047
- Heliocentric radial velocity: 4,483 km/s
- Distance: 197.4 Mly (60.53 Mpc)
- Apparent magnitude (V): 13
- Surface brightness: 23.34 mag/arcsec2

Characteristics
- Type: SB0

Other designations
- IRAS 05091+0508, UGC 3265, MCG -1-14-2, PGC 16899

NGC 1819 is a lenticular galaxy in the constellation of Orion. It was discovered on December 26, 1885, by American astronomer Lewis A. Swift. This galaxy is located at a distance of 197.4 million light-years (60.53 Mpc) from the Milky Way, and is receding with a heliocentric radial velocity of 4,483 km/s.

The morphological classification of NGC 1819 is SB0 in the De Vaucouleurs system, indicating this is a lenticular galaxy with a barred spiral organization. It is a gas-rich galaxy with a circumnuclear ring structure that is undergoing intense star formation.

Magnitude 16 Type Ia supernova SN 2005el was discovered by the Lick Observatory Supernova Search (LOSS) on September 25, 2005. It was positioned 39.0″ east and 22.6″ south of the nucleus.

NGC 1819 is part of a galaxy group known as NGC 434 Group or LGG 130. It has at least 5 members, which are NGC 1819, UGC 3294, UGC 3296, IC 413 and IC 412.
