= NGC 5260 =

Galaxy in the constellation Hydra

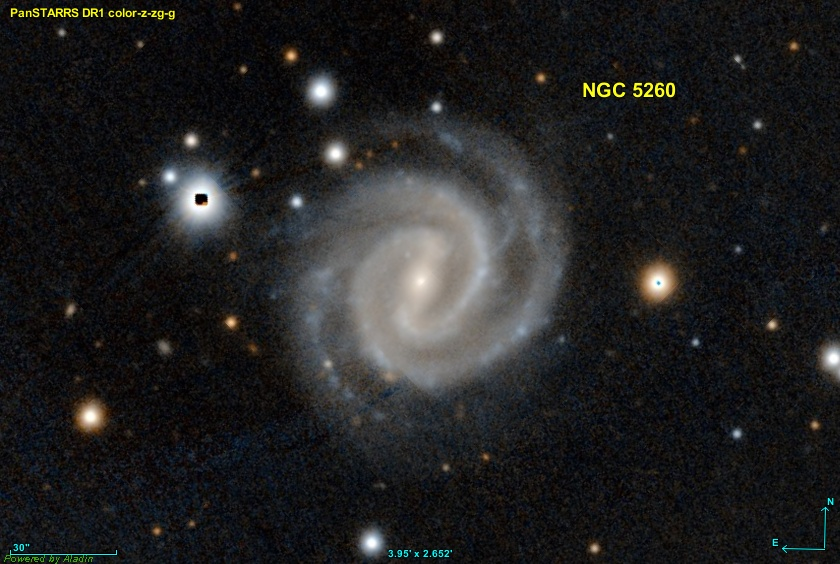
- NGC 5260 imaged by Pan-STARRS

Observation data (J2000 epoch)
- Constellation: Hydra
- Right ascension: 13^{h} 40^{m} 19.8871^{s}
- Declination: −23° 51′ 28.813″
- Redshift: 0.021688
- Heliocentric radial velocity: 6502 ± 7 km/s
- Distance: 326.6 ± 22.9 Mly (100.13 ± 7.02 Mpc)
- Group or cluster: RR 254
- Apparent magnitude (V): 12.8

Characteristics
- Type: SB(s)c
- Size: ~248,900 ly (76.32 kpc) (estimated)
- Apparent size (V): 1.6′ × 1.4′

Other designations
- IRAS 13375-2336, 2MASX J13401990-2351291, MCG -04-32-050, PGC 48371, ESO 509- G 092, RR 254a

NGC 5260 is a barred spiral galaxy in the constellation of Hydra. Its velocity with respect to the cosmic microwave background is 6789 ± 21 km/s, which corresponds to a Hubble distance of 100.13 ± 7.02 Mpc (~327 million light-years). It was discovered by American astronomer Lewis Swift on 6 April 1885.

According to the SIMBAD database, NGC 5260 is a Seyfert II galaxy, i.e. it has a quasar-like nuclei with very high surface brightnesses whose spectra reveal strong, high-ionisation emission lines, but unlike quasars, the host galaxy is clearly detectable.

NGC 5260 forms a physical pair with galaxy ESO 509-93, collectively named RR 254, with an optical separation of 241″ between them.

== Supernovae ==
Two supernovae have been observed in NGC 5260:

- SN 2022jkx (Type Ib, mag. 18.819) was discovered by ATLAS on 3 May 2022.
- SN 2023dtd (Type II, mag. 18.516) was discovered by ATLAS on 20 March 2023.

== See also ==
- List of NGC objects (5001–6000)
