= NGC 75 =

Galaxy in the constellation Pisces

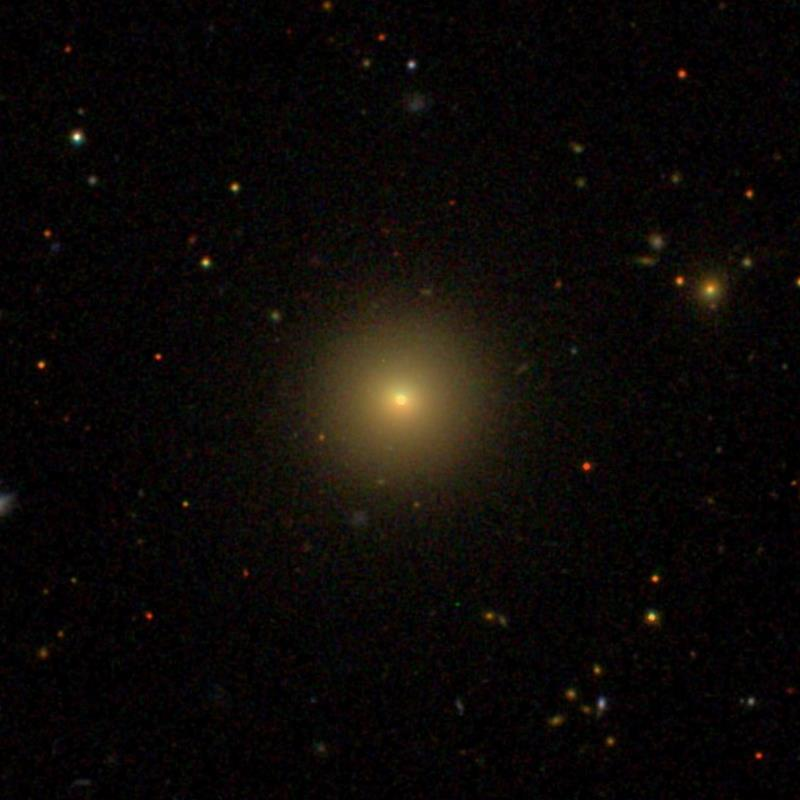
- SDSS image of NGC 75

Observation data (J2000 epoch)
- Constellation: Pisces
- Right ascension: 00^{h} 19^{m} 26.356^{s}
- Declination: +06° 26′ 57.33″
- Redshift: 0.019273
- Heliocentric radial velocity: 5722 km/s
- Distance: 261.9 ± 18.4 Mly (80.31 ± 5.65 Mpc)
- Apparent magnitude (B): 14.64

Characteristics
- Type: S0

Other designations
- UGC 182, MCG +01-01-051, PGC 1255

NGC 75 is a lenticular galaxy estimated to be about 260 million light-years away in the constellation of Pisces. It was discovered by Lewis A. Swift from the USA in 1886 and its magnitude is 13.2.
