= NGC 161 =

Galaxy in the constellation Cetus

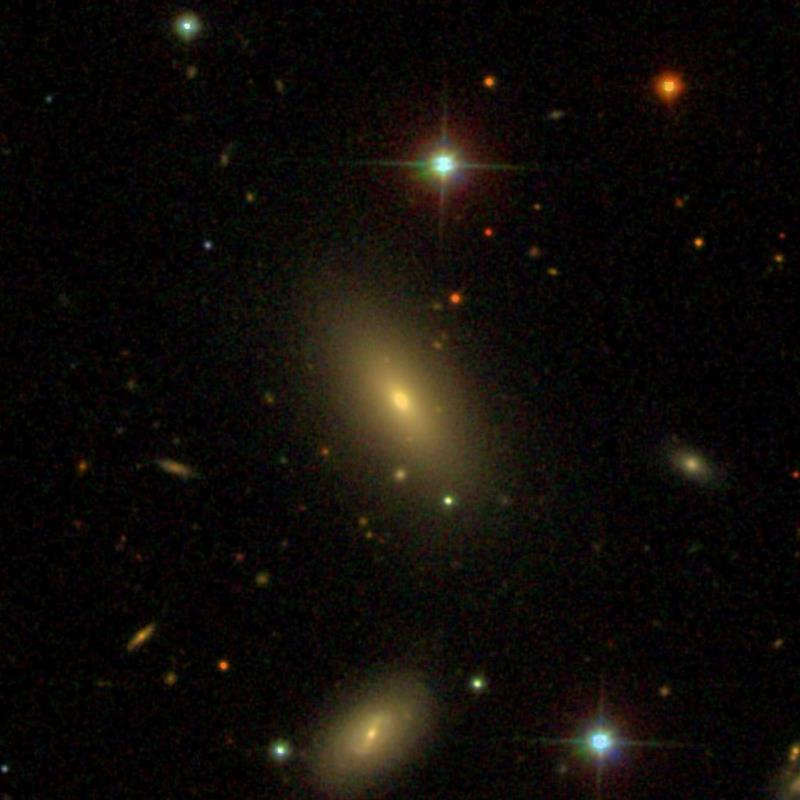
- SDSS image of NGC 161

Observation data (J2000 epoch)
- Constellation: Cetus
- Right ascension: 00^{h} 35^{m} 33.941^{s}
- Declination: −02° 50′ 55.52″
- Redshift: 0.020311
- Heliocentric radial velocity: 6089
- Distance: 230 Mly (72 Mpc)
- Apparent magnitude (B): 15

Characteristics
- Type: S0^{0}
- Size: 92,100 ly (28,240 pc) (Note: RC3 D_25; R_25 (blue) values used.)
- Apparent size (V): 1.3′ × 0.8′

Other designations
- MGC-01-02-036, PGC 2131

NGC 161 is a lenticular galaxy in the constellation Cetus. It was discovered on November 21, 1886, by Lewis A. Swift.
