= NGC 48 =

Galaxy in the constellation Andromeda

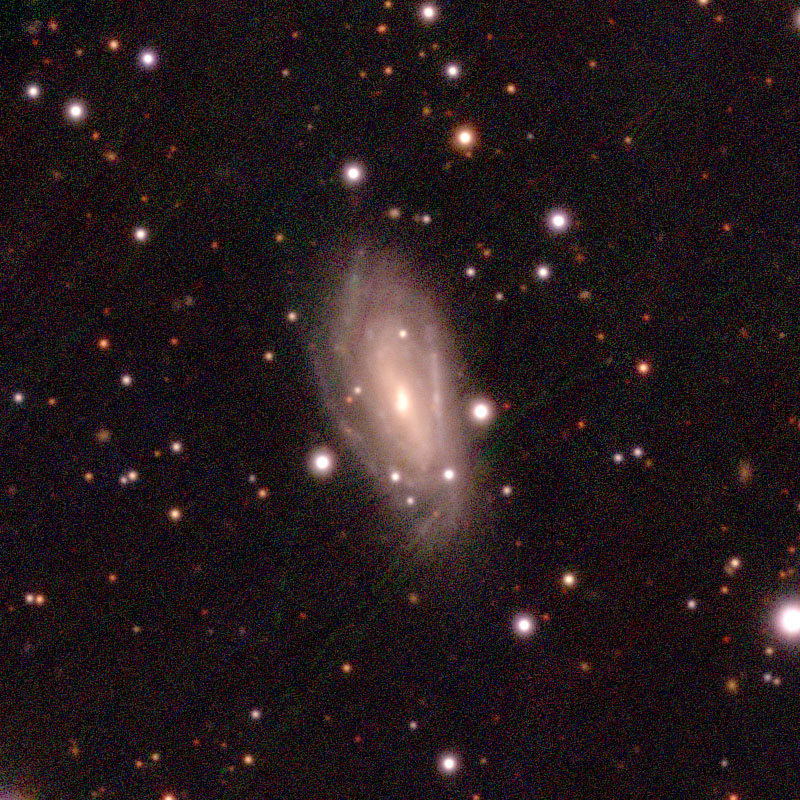
- NGC 48 (PanSTARRS)

Observation data (J2000 epoch)
- Constellation: Andromeda
- Right ascension: 00^{h} 14^{m} 02.2^{s}
- Declination: +48° 14′ 05″
- Redshift: 0.005924
- Heliocentric radial velocity: 1776 ± 8 km/s
- Distance: 79.3 Mly
- Apparent magnitude (V): 14.4

Characteristics
- Type: SABbc
- Apparent size (V): 1.4' x 0.9'

Other designations
- IRAS 00113+4757, 2MASX J00140221+4814055, UGC 133, MCG +08-01-031, PGC 929, CGCG 549-027

The New General Catalogue object NGC 48 is a barred spiral galaxy in the constellation Andromeda. Its velocity with respect to the cosmic microwave background is 1,506±21 km/s, which corresponds to a Hubble distance of 72.4 ± 5.2 Mly (22.21 ± 1.59 Mpc). However, three non-redshift measurements give a much farther mean distance of 136.88 ± 32.82 Mly (41.967 ± 10.064 Mpc). It was discovered by American astronomer Lewis A. Swift on 7 September 1885.

== See also ==
- List of NGC objects (1–1000)
