= NGC 332 =

Compact lenticular galaxy in the constellation Pisces

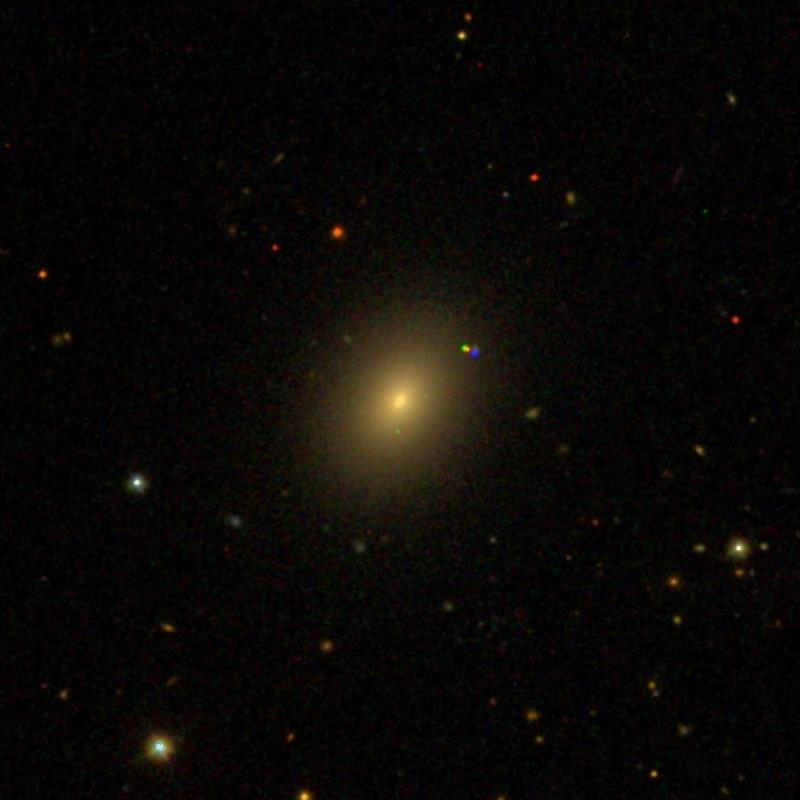
- SDSS image of NGC 332

Observation data (J2000 epoch)
- Constellation: Pisces
- Right ascension: 00^{h} 58^{m} 49.1^{s}
- Declination: +07° 06′ 41″
- Redshift: 0.017429
- Heliocentric radial velocity: 5,225 km/s
- Apparent magnitude (V): 14.9
- Apparent magnitude (B): 14.9
- Surface brightness: 24.46 mag/arcsec^{2}
- Magnitude (J): 11.32
- Magnitude (H): 10.56
- Magnitude (K): 10.32

Characteristics
- Type: cG; E/S0
- Apparent size (V): 1.3' × 1.3'

Other designations
- UGC 00609, CGCG 410-021, 2MASX J00584912+0706406, PGC 3511.

NGC 332 is a compact and/or lenticular galaxy in the constellation Pisces. It was discovered on October 22, 1886, by Lewis Swift. It was described by Dreyer as "very faint, small, round, several stars near to south." It is visible when using a telescope with an aperture of 20 inches (500 mm) or more
