= NGC 3426 =

Galaxy in the constellation Leo

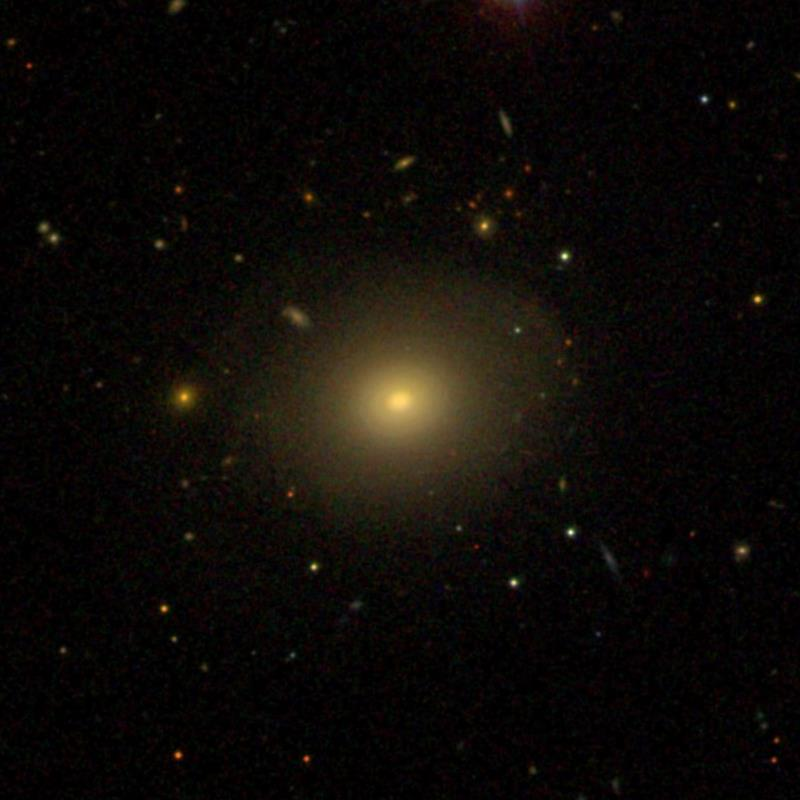
- SDSS image of NGC 3426

Observation data (J2000 epoch)
- Constellation: Leo
- Right ascension: 10^{h} 51^{m} 41.75169^{s}
- Declination: +18° 28′ 50.9424″
- Redshift: 0.020394
- Heliocentric radial velocity: 6052 ± 8 km/s
- Distance: 310.5 ± 21.9 Mly (95.19 ± 6.70 Mpc)
- Apparent magnitude (B): 13.9

Characteristics
- Type: S0

Other designations
- UGC 5975, MCG +03-28-020, PGC 32577

NGC 3426 is a lenticular galaxy located in the constellation Leo. It was discovered on March 23, 1887, by the astronomer Lewis A. Swift.

One supernova has been observed in NGC 3426: SN 2019ape (type Ic, mag. 18.6).

== See also ==
- List of NGC objects (3001–4000)
