= NGC 6764 =

Spiral galaxy in the constellation Cygnus

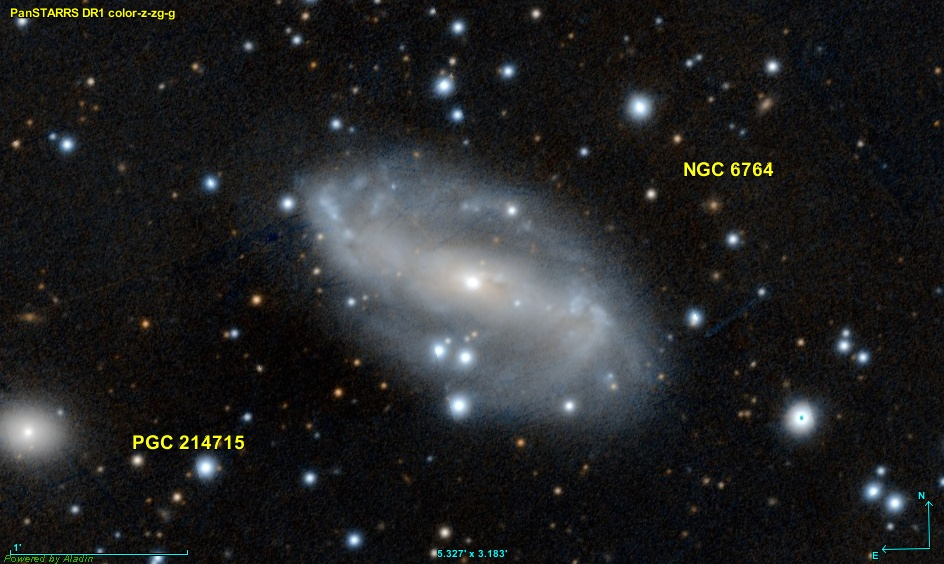

Observation data (J2000.0 epoch)
- Constellation: Cygnus
- Right ascension: 19^{h} 08^{m} 16.6^{s}
- Declination: +50° 55′ 59″
- Redshift: 0.008059
- Heliocentric radial velocity: 2405 ± 1
- Distance: 111 million LY
- Apparent magnitude (V): 11.9

Characteristics
- Type: SBbc
- Apparent size (V): 2.20 x 1.2

Other designations
- PGC 62806

NGC 6764 (also known as UGC 11407) is a barred spiral galaxy in the constellation Cygnus. It's classified as a type SBbc galaxy. It was first discovered in 1885 by astronomer Lewis Swift. The galaxy's radial velocity, relative to the cosmic microwave background is measured at around 2257 ± 10 km/s, corresponding to a Hubble distance of around 33.29 ± 2.34 MPC
