= NGC 1349 =

Galaxy in the constellation Taurus

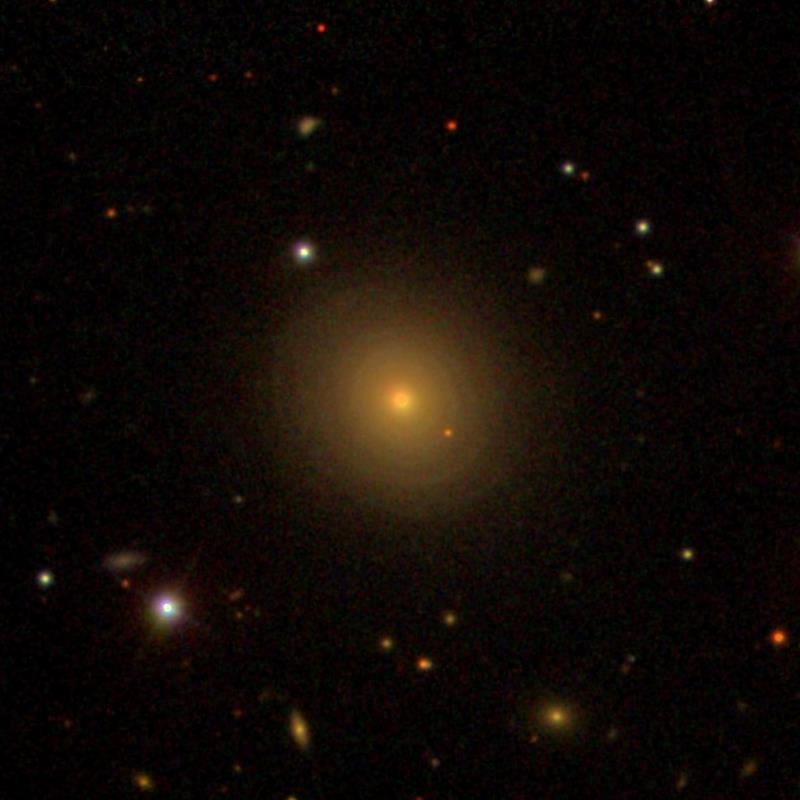
- NGC 1349 imaged by Sloan Digital Sky Survey

Observation data (J2000 epoch)
- Constellation: Taurus
- Right ascension: 03^{h} 31^{m} 27.5154^{s}
- Declination: +04° 22′ 51.252″
- Redshift: 0.022061 ± 0.000012
- Heliocentric radial velocity: 6,614 ± 4 km/s
- Distance: 287 ± 20 Mly (88.0 ± 6.2 Mpc)
- Apparent magnitude (V): 13.2

Characteristics
- Type: S0
- Size: ~83,000 ly (25.6 kpc) (estimated)
- Apparent size (V): 0.7′ × 0.7′

Other designations
- IRAS F10012+3125, UGC 2774, MCG +01-09-006, PGC 13088, CGCG 416-013

NGC 1349 is a lenticular galaxy in the constellation Taurus. The galaxy lies about 290 million light years away from Earth, which means, given its apparent dimensions, that NGC 1349 is approximately 80,000 light years across. It was discovered by Lewis Swift on December 20, 1886.

The galaxy is characterised as a lenticular galaxy, having a disk and a bulge. Almost 95% of the stars in the bulge are old, created more than 6 billion years ago, while the stars in the disk are younger, as 59% have ages between 1 and 6 billion years. The spectrum of the nuclear region shows it is a combination of a LINER and a star formation area. The outer region of the galaxy features structures that look like spiral arms. These spiral structures host about 80% of the galaxy's total H-alpha emission and are a place of active star formation, in HII regions. The star formation rate is estimated to be 0.1–0.3 M_{☉} per year.

The galaxy appears to be isolated.
