= NGC 64 =

Spiral galaxy in the constellation Cetus

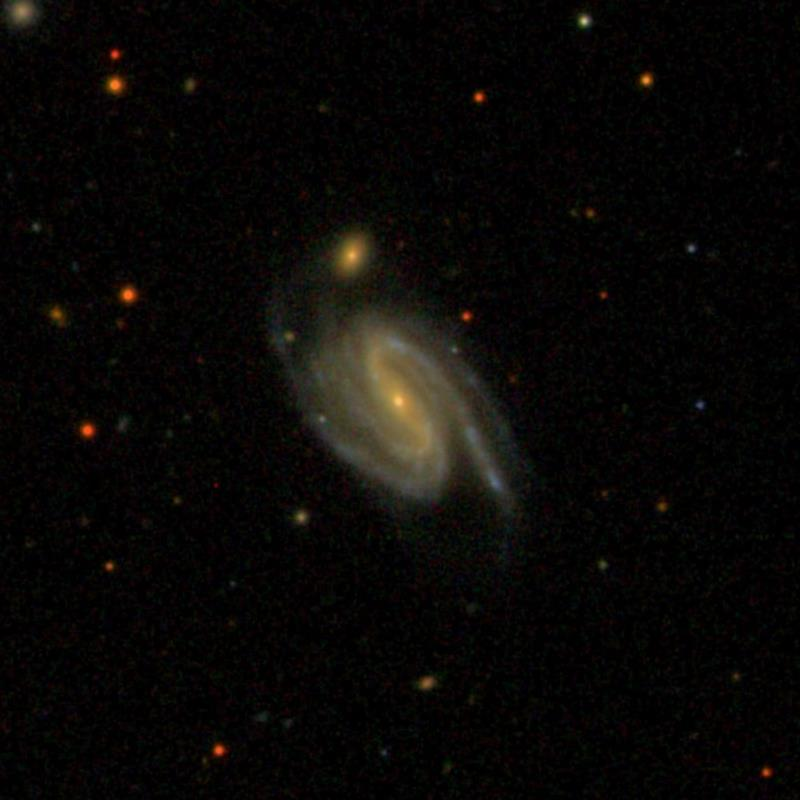
- SDSS image of NGC 64

Observation data (J2000 epoch)
- Constellation: Cetus
- Right ascension: 00^{h} 17^{m} 30.368^{s}
- Declination: −06° 49′ 28.69″
- Redshift: 0.024384
- Heliocentric radial velocity: 7312 ± 9 km/s
- Apparent magnitude (V): 13.2

Characteristics
- Type: SB(s)bc
- Apparent size (V): 1.5' × 1.1'

Other designations
- NGC 64, MCG 01-01-068, PGC 1149.

NGC 64 is a barred spiral galaxy discovered by Lewis Swift in 1886, and is located in the constellation Cetus.

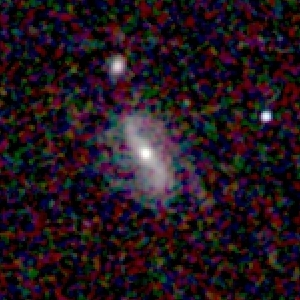
NGC 64 (near-infrared)
