= Warner Observatory =

Observatory in New York state, US

- Woodcut of The Warner Observatory published in 1887. The view is along East Avenue.
- Organization: Lewis A. Swift
- Location: Rochester, New York
- Coordinates: 43.15361°N 77.59000°W
- Altitude: 511 feet (156 m)
- Established: 1882
- Closed: 1893

Telescopes
- (Unnamed): 16 inches (40.6 cm) refractive

The Warner Observatory was completed in Rochester, New York in 1882. It was financed by Hulbert Harrington Warner, patron to the American astronomer Lewis Swift.

By the time the 16-inch refractive telescope, made by Alvan Clark and Sons, was installed, it had cost Warner almost $100,000 but was the fourth largest in the United States at the time. Swift used the observatory to investigate comets and nebulae, including the periodic comet 11P/Tempel-Swift-LINEAR. On Tuesday and Friday evenings, Swift opened the doors to the public to those who had bought a .25-cent ticket from Warner's Patent Medicine Store. This was the first time an observatory had been opened to the public.

After Warner was forced into bankruptcy in 1893, Swift moved the telescope to California where his new patron, Thaddeus S. C. Lowe, was building an observatory on Echo Mountain. By that time observations in New York were becoming increasingly difficult due to the developing city around it.

The building then fell vacant, and between 1901 and 1909 it was operated as the Vernon Academy of Mental Sciences and the Vernon Sanatorium. In 1920 the building was boarded up, and finally razed in 1931.

A good description of the observatory can be found in Swift's own notes:

"…It is delightfully situated on the south side of East Avenue, one of the most beautiful and fashionable streets of this city. The building stands about one-third of a mile south of the University of Rochester, nearly one and one-half miles south of east of the Court House, a few steps west of the princely residence of Mr. H. H. Warner, on what fifty years ago was a dense forest. Its horizon is nearly unobstructed, in every direction, in some points forty miles distant being had. In nearly every outlook, woodland, field and meadow combine to produce most picturesque effect.

The material used in its construction is white sandstone from Lockport--sixty miles west--and, unlike many varieties of this kind of stone, is free from red oxide of iron. The tower is circular in form, with a diameter of thirty-one feet, outside measurement. Its revolving dome is, of course, of the same diameter. This dome embodies some novel features, and in the matter of economy of construction, lightness, ease of revolution and simplicity of the device for rotating, leaves little to be desired."

== See also ==
- List of astronomical observatories
