= 64P/Swift–Gehrels =

Jupiter-family comet

64P/Swift-Gehrels
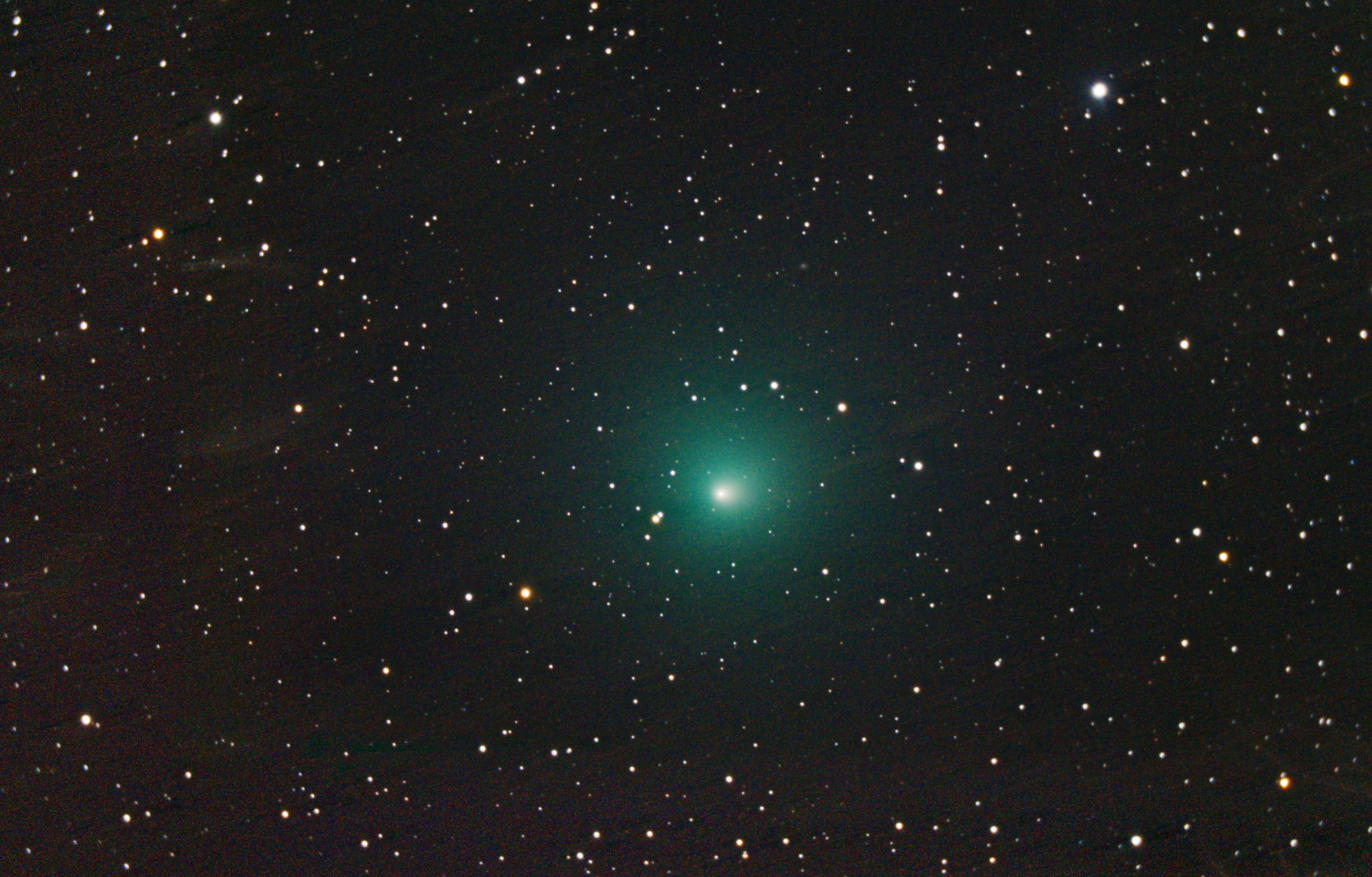
- Comet Swift–Gehrels photographed by Alexander Vasenin from Moscow, Russia on 11 October 2018

Discovery
- Discovered by: Lewis A. Swift; Tom Gehrels
- Discovery date: 17 November 1889; 8 February 1973

Designations
- MPC designation: P/1889 W1, P/1973 C1
- Alternative designations: Swift 1; 1889 VI, 1972 VII; 1981 XIX, 1991 II

Orbital characteristics
- Epoch: 9 December 2017 (JD 2458096.5)
- Observation arc: 129.46 years (Note: Observation arc from the Minor Planet Center database only covered dates from 27 December 1889 until 4 May 2019 (129.35 years). This figure includes its entire arc up to 17 November 1889.)
- Number of observations: 3,580
- Aphelion: 7.518 AU
- Perihelion: 1.393 AU
- Semi-major axis: 4.456 AU
- Eccentricity: 0.687
- Orbital period: 9.407 years
- Inclination: 8.948°
- Longitude of ascending node: 300.00°
- Argument of periapsis: 97.144°
- Last perihelion: 3 November 2018
- Next perihelion: 31 March 2028
- T_{Jupiter}: 2.496
- Earth MOID: 0.440 AU
- Jupiter MOID: 0.649 AU

Physical characteristics
- Mean radius: 1.61 km (1.00 mi)
- Spectral type: (B–V) = 0.68±0.03; (V–R) = 0.08±0.01
- Comet total magnitude (M1): 14.5
- Apparent magnitude: 9.0 (2018 apparition)

Comet Swift–Gehrels, also known as 64P/Swift–Gehrels, is a Jupiter-family comet with a current orbital period of 9.23 years.

== Observational history ==
It was originally discovered on 17 November 1889 by Lewis A. Swift at the Warner Observatory, Rochester, New York, and was described by Swift as being pretty faint. It was rediscovered after it became a lost comet on 8 February 1973 by Tom Gehrels at the Palomar Observatory, California who estimated its brightness as a very low magnitude 19.

It was also observed in 1981, 1991, 2000, 2009 and 2018. The 2018 apparition was the most favourable, with the comet reaching a peak magnitude of 9. It had its closest approach to the Earth on 28 October 2018, at a distance of 0.445 au. The comet had four outbursts. The brightest was on 14 August, during which the comet brightened 2.7 magnitudes. Another small outburst on 3 January 2019 was observed from the Yaoan High Precision Telescope (YHPT) of the Purple Mountain Observatory in China.

== Notes ==
Numbered comets
Previous; 63P/Wild	64P/Swift–Gehrels	Next; 65P/Gunn
