= IC 289 =

Nebula in the constellation Cassiopeia

Emission nebula
- Planetary nebula
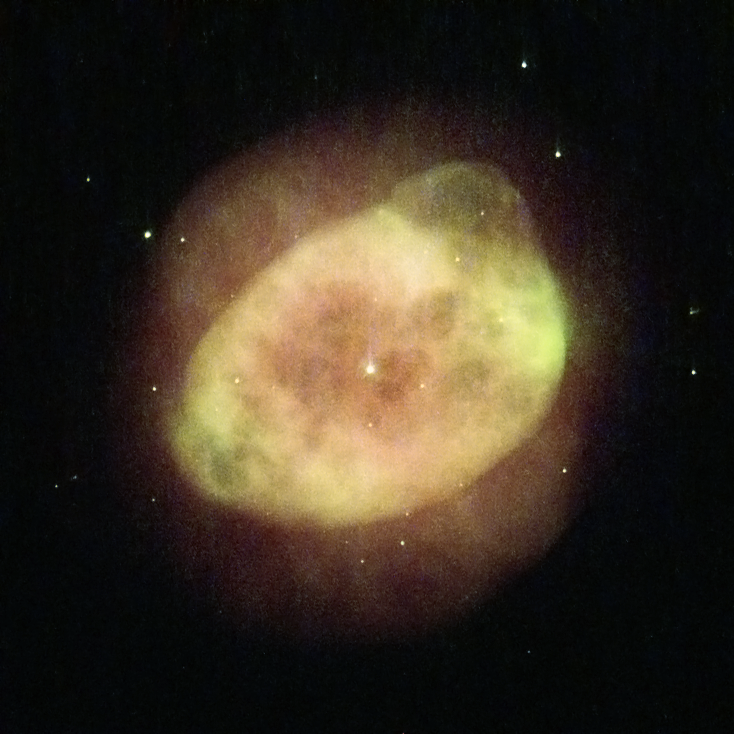
- As seen by Hubble

Observation data: J2000.0 epoch
- Right ascension: 03^{h} 10^{m} 19.3017^{s}
- Declination: +61° 19′ 00.914″
- Distance: 5,190 ± 500 ly (1,592 ± 153 pc) ly
- Constellation: Cassiopeia
- Designations: IRAS 03062+6107, 2MASS J03101930+6119009, ARO 86, Hb 1, VV 9, RL 67, Lan 496, NSV 1056, GSC2 N313033135782

IC 289 is a planetary nebula in the constellation Cassiopeia. It was discovered by Lewis Swift in early September 1888. It lies close to the 10th magnitude star BD +60° 0631. N.J. Martin described IC 289 as "A nice, faint round planet like planetary nebula. The uniform oval disc shows some irregularity in brightness but is not obviously brighter at the edge."

The central star of the planetary nebula is an O-type star with a spectral type of O(H).
