= NGC 27 =

Galaxy in the constellation Andromeda

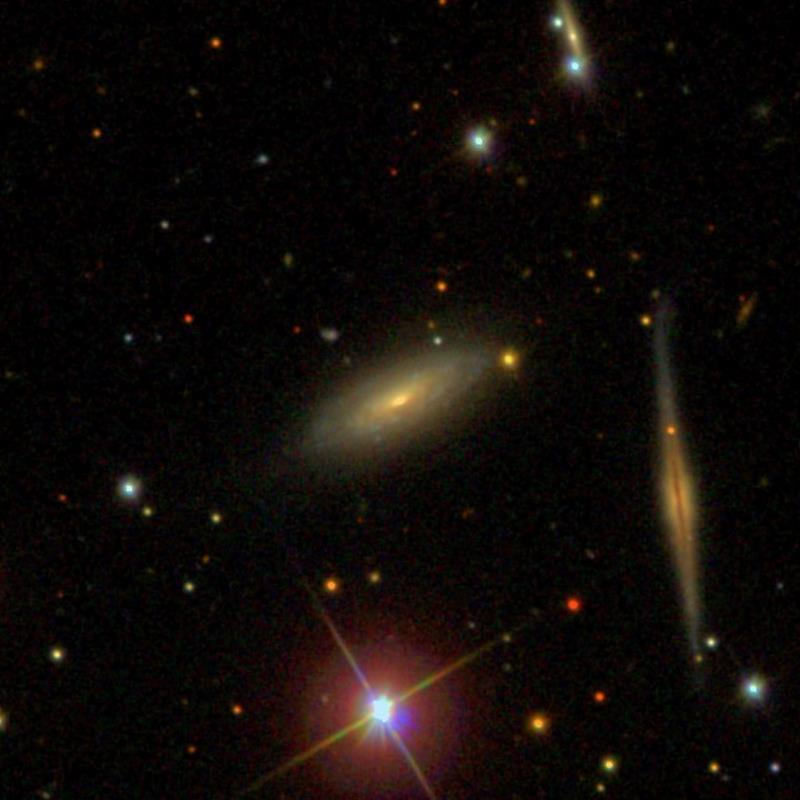
- SDSS image of NGC 27 (center)

Observation data (J2000 epoch)
- Constellation: Andromeda
- Right ascension: 00^{h} 10^{m} 32.75799^{s}
- Declination: +28° 59′ 46.4283″
- Redshift: 0.02343
- Heliocentric radial velocity: 6941 km/s
- Distance: 327.66 ± 0.65 Mly (100.46 ± 0.20 Mpc)
- Apparent magnitude (B): 14.43

Characteristics
- Type: Sbc

Other designations
- UGC 96, MCG +05-01-044, PGC 742

NGC 27 is a spiral galaxy located in the constellation Andromeda. It was discovered on 3 August 1884 by Lewis Swift. It forms a galaxy pair with the nearby UGC 95.

== See also ==
- Spiral galaxy
- List of largest galaxies
- List of nearest galaxies
- List of NGC objects (1–1000)
- Andromeda (constellation)
