= C/1892 E1 (Swift) =

Long-period comet

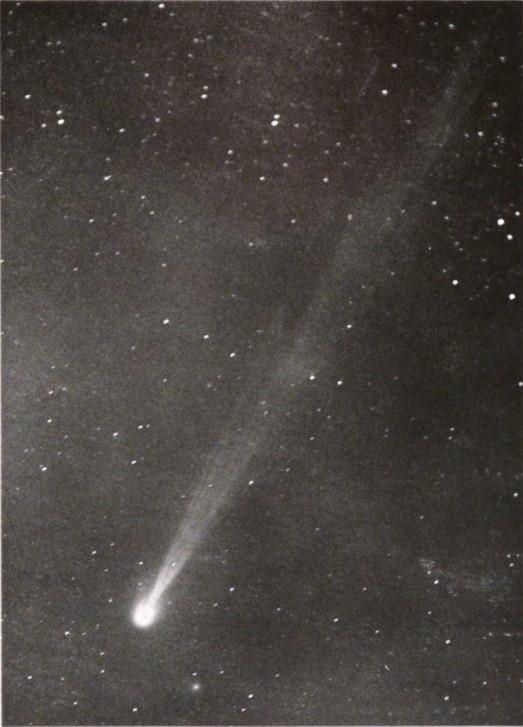
- The comet on 5 April 1892 photographed by Edward Emerson Barnard

Discovery
- Discovered by: Lewis A. Swift
- Discovery date: 7 March 1892

Designations
- Alternative designations: 1892a, 1892 I

Orbital characteristics
- Epoch: 27 July 1892 (JD 2412306.5)
- Observation arc: 230 days
- Number of observations: 53
- Aphelion: 1,710 AU
- Perihelion: 1.027 AU
- Semi-major axis: 860 AU
- Eccentricity: 0.9988
- Orbital period: 25,000 years
- Inclination: 38.701°
- Longitude of ascending node: 242.428°
- Argument of periapsis: 24.504°
- Last perihelion: 7 April 1892
- T_{Jupiter}: 0.986
- Earth MOID: 0.058 AU
- Jupiter MOID: 1.63 AU

Physical characteristics
- Mean radius: 3.05 km (1.90 mi) (Note: Calculated mean radius using the formula: $\log_{10}\,(\,R\,)\ =\;0.9 +\;0.13 (\,H\,)$ Where $\,H\,$ is the comet's absolute total magnitude (M1))
- Comet total magnitude (M1): 3.2

C/1892 E1 (Swift) is a non-periodic comet discovered by Lewis A. Swift on 7 March 1892. The comet became visible with naked eye.

== Observational history ==
The comet was discovered by Lewis A. Swift on 7 March 1892 using the 11-cm telescope at Warner Observatory in Rochester, New York. The comet was then located in Sagittarius. at a solar elongation of 65°, and moving eastwards. Edward Emerson Barnard spotted the comet with naked eye on 8 March and estimated its magnitude to be 5–6. He described the comet as having a round coma about 8 arcminutes across and a faint tail.

At that point the comet was moving both towards Earth and the Sun. On 10 March Johann Holetschek estimated its magnitude to be 4. On 16 March E. E. Barnard said it was quite easily seen with naked eye. A photograph of the comet from 11 March showed the comet had five rays emanating from the nucleus, the longest of which was 35 arcminutes long. The closest approach to Earth took place on 27 March, at a distance of 1.05 AU, while perihelion took place on 7 April.

In April the comet was better visible from the southern hemisphere. On 2 and 8 April, J. M. Thorne from Cordoba, Argentina estimated the comet had a magnitude a little brighter than 3 and a tail 15 degrees long, which however couldn't be observed with naked eye. Barnard photographed the comet on 7 April and noted the tail forked into two branches. Chinese sources claim a "broom star" was visible between 28 March 1892 and 26 April 1892.

In May the comet faded as it was moving away from both Earth and the Sun. On May 1, the comet's head was reported to be of 4th magnitude by Backhouse while on May 28 Holetschek estimated the comet's magnitude to be 5.5. Schur reported the comet had a tail about 1.5 degrees long on 27. By June 10 the comet was hardly visible with naked eye and on 27 June its magnitude was reported by A. Abetti to be 7. On August 30 its magnitude had dropped to 8, as estimated by Holetschek.

The comet was last observed on 16 February 1893, when it was at distance of 4.78 AU from Earth and 4.3 AU from the Sun.
