= Hulbert Harrington Warner =

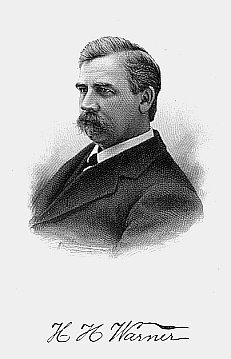
- Engraving of H. H. Warner
- Born: 1842; Syracuse, New York, United States
- Died: 1923
- Occupations: Businessman and philanthropist
- Known for: Making his fortune from the sales of patent medicine

Hulbert Harrington Warner (1842–1923) was a Rochester, New York businessman and philanthropist who made his fortune from the sales of patent medicine.

== Biography ==
He was born near Syracuse, New York, in a small settlement called Warners. Warners had been named for Warner's grandfather, Seth, who had moved there in 1807 from Stockbridge, Massachusetts. In 1865, Warner moved to Michigan to engage in the stove and hardware business. In 1870, Warner moved to Rochester and entered into the first business that would make him a millionaire, selling fire- and burglar-proof safes. The demand for safes had escalated dramatically after the discovery of oil in western Pennsylvania; by decade's end, it is estimated that Warner and his sales agents had sold 60,000 safes worth an estimated $10 million ($334 million in present terms).

== Marriage and children ==
Warner was married twice. He married Martha L. Keeney of Skaneateles, New York in 1864. Martha died suddenly in 1871, and is buried at Lakeview Cemetery in Skaneateles.

In 1872, Warner remarried, this time to Emily Olive Stoddard of Michigan. Although the details of his second marriage remain vague, it appears that Warner and Stoddard separated in 1893. It appears that the couple may have had one child, Maud, but there is little information available about her.

Warner later lived with Christina de Martinez of Mexico. Warner and Martinez were never actually married (and it appears that Warner and Stoddard were never divorced), but Martinez took Warner's name as her own and they resided in the same household after Warner moved to Minneapolis.

== Patent medicines ==
=== Safe Cure ===
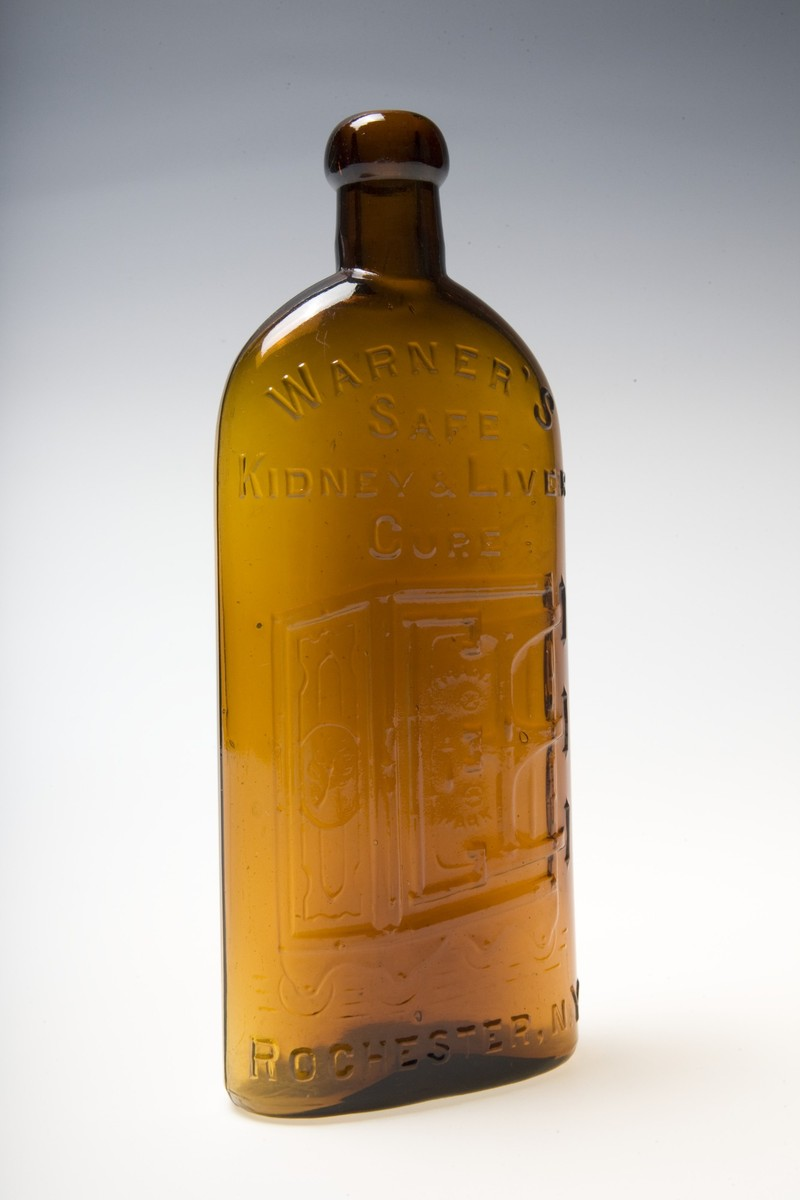
Warner's Safe Kidney and Liver Cure amber bottle

Based upon the history recounted in Warner's early almanacs, Warner used a portion of the wealth he accumulated from the safe business to purchase the formula for a patent medicine from Dr. Charles Craig of Rochester. Warner developed an unexpectedly severe case of Bright's disease, a kidney disease. While close to death, Warner used a vegetable concoction sold by Craig and was restored to health. Based upon his admiration for Craig's Original Kidney Cure, Warner purchased the formula and the rights to the product and in 1879 introduced Warner's Safe Kidney & Liver Cure.

Although Warner's early publications herald Craig's potion as a revelation, references to Craig soon disappeared from Warner's advertising, and ultimately the two ended up in court when Craig attempted to reenter the patent medicine business with a cure remarkably similar to the one he had sold to Warner.

In addition to his Kidney & Liver Cure, Warner also introduced a Safe Nervine, Safe Diabetes Cure, Safe Tonic, Safe Tonic Bitters, Safe Bitters, Safe Rheumatic Cure, Safe Pills, and later his Tippecanoe Bitters. The Warner's patent medicine products, with the exception of the Safe Pills and Tippecanoe, appeared in a unique bottle, which featured an embossed safe on the front. This drew upon his earlier business and implied to his potential customers that his product posed no risk.

In January, 1884, Warner opened his new Rochester headquarters in a lavish multi-story building on St. Paul Street. The H. H. Warner Building became the centerpiece of his medicine production and turned out an estimated 7,000 US gallons (26,000 L) of Safe Cure per day. It also served as the headquarters for his promotional department, which published an untold number of almanac and advertising circulars distributed with his medicines to local druggists and grocers. The Warner Building still exists today and houses a variety of businesses. Its granite façade still bears the initial "W".

=== Log Cabin Remedies ===
In 1887, Warner introduced a new product line, which he called his Log Cabin Remedies. Unlike his Safe Cures, these products appeared in amber bottles with three slanted panels with the name of the particular remedy embossed. The bottles were in red, white, blue, and yellow boxes that featured the image of a log cabin viewed from a window. The Log Cabin Remedies did not replace the Safe Cure line; they only supplemented it. Warner realized that the nation was in a head-long race for expansion westward and his marketing pitch appealed to the American desire for self-reliance. Indeed, the entire thrust of Warner's marketing from its inception can best be described as appealing to his customer's desire to "heal thyself".

=== Warner's Foreign Offices ===
Based upon his success in marketing his Safe Cure products in the United States, Warner quickly decided to expand his operation internationally. In 1883, he opened offices in Toronto, Ontario, Canada and London, England. The bottles from Toronto have become known as "3-Cities", because they featured the names of all of his offices at that time: Rochester, London, and Toronto.

In 1887, he opened offices in Melbourne, Australia and Frankfurt, Germany. In 1888, he expanded to Pressburg in Hungary; however, this office lasted only two years. In 1891, he opened an office in Dunedin, New Zealand; the bottles from that office have become known as "4-Cities", bearing the names of Rochester, Toronto, London, and Melbourne. The Dundein office was likely little more than a laboratory and, in fact, bottles from the Melbourne and Dundein offices were likely produced in either Rochester or London and shipped to the southern-hemisphere offices due to the primitive state of glass production that existed there at the time.

Warner's advertising also boasts offices in Kreuslingen, Switzerland; Brussels; and Paris. No bottles with these cities embossed have ever appeared, and only one bottle labeled in French is known to exist.

Warner's offices lasted well into the 20th century, with the Rochester office closing around 1944.

== Philanthropy and failure ==
Having made millions on his second business in patent medicine, Warner embarked on various philanthropic endeavors, most notably his sponsorship of the Warner Observatory in Rochester.

Prior to opening his patent medicine business, Warner had chanced to meet Dr. Lewis Swift, an astronomer, who was ready to leave Rochester for Colorado when Warner convinced him to stay and operate his new observatory. The observatory was completed in 1883 at the then-staggering cost of $100,000 (in current terms$, 3.46 million). It was equipped with a state-of-the-art telescope and was pronounced as being the best-equipped private observatory in the world.

The Observatory was used as a marketing centerpiece by Warner. His almanacs at the time ran essay contents and featured images of the Observatory. Swift used the Observatory to good end, and reportedly discovered six new comets and 900 nebulae.

At one point, Warner offered a reward of $200 for each new comet discovered. This offer was of great help to the young astronomer Edward Emerson Barnard, who claimed eight such awards and used the proceeds to set himself and his new wife up in a newly built house in Nashville, Tennessee.

Astronomer Swift and his telescope left Rochester in 1894. The Observatory was demolished in December, 1931.

Warner also used his money to construct a lavish mansion for himself on East Avenue in Rochester. The house fell into disuse and was later demolished.

Warner's patent-medicine empire reached its pinnacle in the late 1880s and began its gradual decline. Flush with success, Warner spent money on highly speculative investments in mining, all of which failed. In an effort to generate more capital, he took the company public, which did generate some revenue.

He sold the company to an English investment group in 1889, which incorporated it as H. H. Warner & Co., Ltd. Warner bought up 80 percent of the English stock, and took the position of managing director of the company. However, Warner's speculative investments and his waning interest in the business took its toll. When the Panic of 1893 hit, Warner was unable to generate additional capital through stock sales, forcing him into bankruptcy. The American branch of his company was sold to a group of Rochester investors, who continued to operate it as the Warner's Safe Remedies Company.

== Life After Safe Cure ==
After failing in Rochester, Warner lived for a time in New York City, then moved to Philadelphia, where he may have attempted to start a new patent medicine business, although this is unconfirmed. He ultimately landed in Minneapolis, where he promoted the Nuera Manufacturing Co., also known as Neura Remedy Co., with the help of his common-law wife Christina de Martinez. He also operated the Warner Renowned Remedies Company, which produced some products offered by mail order.

Warner died in January, 1923, and is buried alongside his first wife, Martha, in Lakeview Cemetery in Skaneateles, NY.

His legacy is his patent medicine empire that produced remedies sold around the world as well as the bottles in which those remedies were contained. The bottles themselves being sought after by some collectors.
