= D/1895 Q1 (Swift) =

Lost comet

Discovery
- Discovered by: Lewis A. Swift
- Discovery site: Mount Lowe Obs.
- Discovery date: 24 August 1895

Orbital characteristics
- Epoch: 25 August 1895 (JD 2413430.5)
- Observation arc: 166 days
- Number of observations: 182
- Aphelion: 6.1609 AU
- Perihelion: 1.2978 AU
- Semi-major axis: 3.7293 AU
- Eccentricity: 0.9725
- Orbital period: 7.2 years
- Inclination: 2.9923°
- Longitude of ascending node: 171.75°
- Argument of periapsis: 167.78°
- Last perihelion: 21 August 1895 (observed); 17 February 2019 (calculated)
- Next perihelion: 19 September 2026 (calculated)
- T_{Jupiter}: 2.677

Physical characteristics
- Apparent magnitude: 13.0 (1895 apparition)

D/1895 Q1 (Swift) is one of 13 comets discovered by American astronomer Lewis A. Swift. A Jupiter-family comet, it was last seen in February 1896 and was not observed since.

== Possible encounter with Mariner 4 ==
On 15 September 1967, the Mariner 4 spacecraft encountered an intense "meteor storm" that lasted for 45 minutes, which may have partially damaged insulation and temporarily changed the attitude of the spacecraft. What caused it remained unidentified until 2006, when astronomer Paul Wiegert examined old comet data and found that Mariner 4 would have been 20 million km (12 million mi) from the possibly shattered nucleus of D/1895 Q1 (Swift). However, Wiegert noted that the comet's orbit during its 1895 apparition was not precisely known, leading to a large potential error in the comet's expected location in 1967.

== See also ==
- List of minor planets and comets visited by spacecraft
