= H. H. Warner Building =

Historic commercial building in New York, United States

- U.S. National Register of Historic Places
- H. H. Warner Building, September 2012

- Location within New York Location within the United States
- Location: 72-82 St. Paul St., Rochester, New York
- Coordinates: 43°9′30″N 77°36′34″W
- Area: less than one acre
- Built: 1883
- Architect: Rogers, Louis P.
- Architectural style: Venetian Gothic
- MPS: Inner Loop MRA
- NRHP reference No.: 85002846
- Added to NRHP: October 04, 1985

H. H. Warner Building is a historic office building located at Rochester in Monroe County, New York. It is a large, seven-story commercial building built in 1883–1884. It is constructed of load-bearing brick walls, a cast-iron vault, timber framework, and a cast-iron facade on St. Paul St. Originally built to house a patent medicine laboratory and warehouse, it now houses retail and apartments. The building has a Venetian Gothic style.

It was listed on the National Register of Historic Places in 1985.
