= C/1899 E1 (Swift) =

Hyperbolic comet

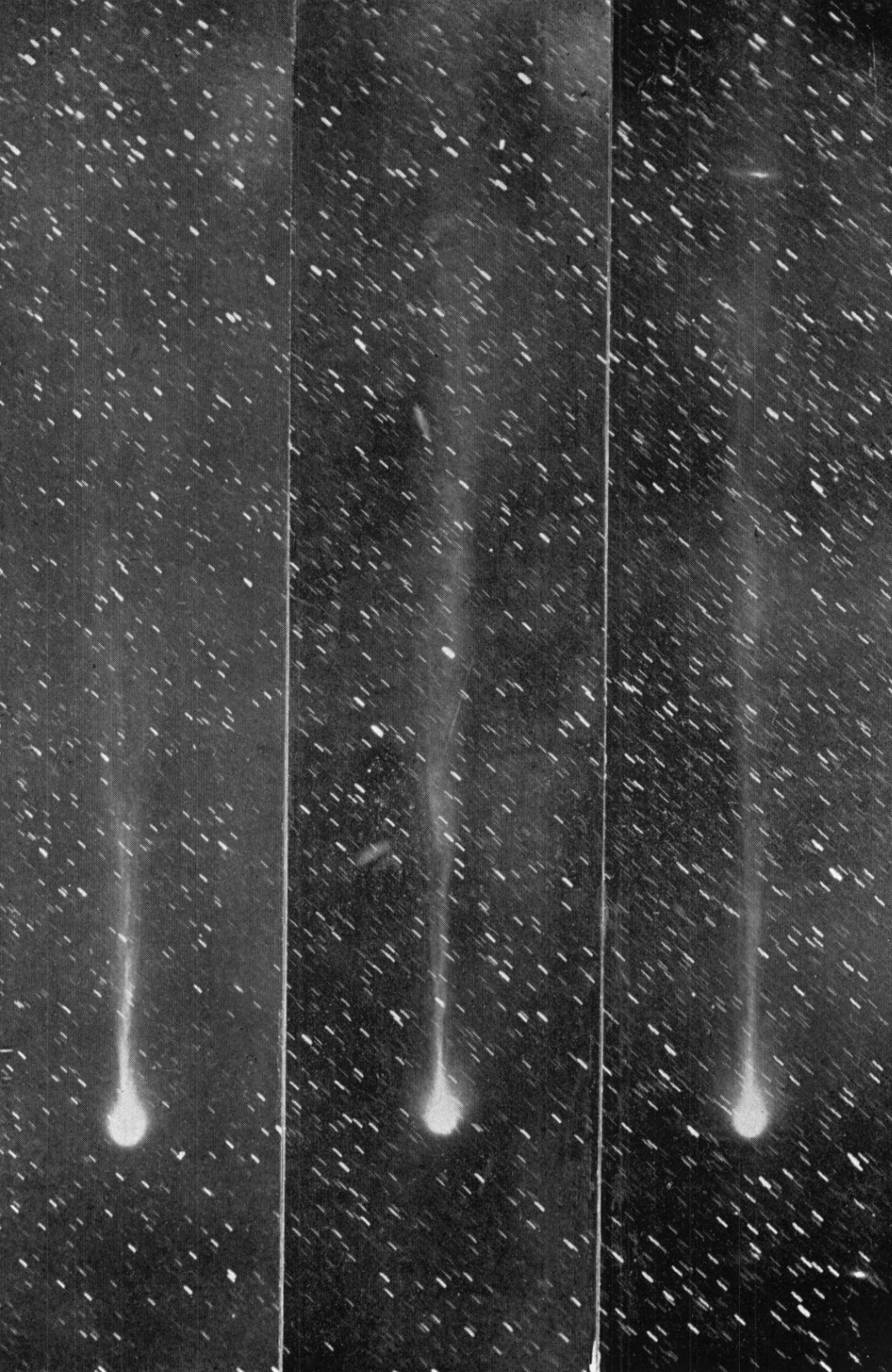
- A series of photographs of Comet Swift taken by Edwin F. Coddington on 8–10 May 1899

Discovery
- Discovered by: Lewis A. Swift
- Discovery site: Mount Lowe Obs.
- Discovery date: 4 March 1899

Designations
- Alternative designations: 1899a 1899 I

Orbital characteristics
- Epoch: 4 May 1899 (JD 2414778.5)
- Observation arc: 126 days
- Number of observations: 151
- Perihelion: 0.327 AU
- Eccentricity: 1.00033
- Inclination: 146.27°
- Longitude of ascending node: 26.41°
- Argument of periapsis: 8.706°
- Last perihelion: 13 April 1899
- Earth MOID: 0.506 AU
- Jupiter MOID: 0.917 AU

Comet Swift, also known as C/1899 E1 from its modern nomenclature, is a hyperbolic comet that became visible to the naked eye in early 1899. It is one of 13 comets discovered by American astronomer, Lewis A. Swift.
