= C/1883 D1 (Brooks–Swift) =

Parabolic comet

Discovery
- Discovered by: William R. Brooks; Lewis A. Swift
- Discovery site: New York, USA
- Discovery date: 24 February 1883

Designations
- Alternative designations: 1883 I, 1883a

Orbital characteristics
- Epoch: 12 March 1883 (JD 2408881.5)
- Observation arc: 31 days
- Number of observations: 9
- Perihelion: 0.760 AU
- Eccentricity: 1.000077
- Inclination: 78.066°
- Longitude of ascending node: 279.77°
- Argument of periapsis: 110.89°
- Last perihelion: 19 February 1883
- Earth MOID: 0.110 AU
- Jupiter MOID: 1.824 AU

Physical characteristics
- Apparent magnitude: 6.0–7.0 (Note: No estimates for the comet's total magnitude were recorded, except for the central condensation of its nucleus.) (1883 apparition)

Comet Brooks–Swift, also known as C/1883 D1 by its modern nomenclature, is a non-periodic comet that was visible telescopically to Earth in the early months of 1883. It was discovered independently by two American astronomers, William Robert Brooks and Lewis A. Swift.

== Discovery and observations ==
The comet was discovered on the morning of 24 February 1883 in the constellation Pegasus. (Note: Reported initial position upon discovery was: α = 22^{h} 50^{m} , δ = 28° 00′) Both Brooks and Swift spotted the comet about 25 minutes from one another, with initial orbital calculations suggesting it already passed perihelion on 19 February.

Nikolaus von Konkoly made spectroscopic observations of the comet on 3 March, two days after it made its closest approach to Earth at a distance of 1.156 AU (172.9 million km). Seth C. Chandler, Jr. watched the comet occult an 8th-magnitude star on the night of 5 March, which enabled him to measure the comet's apparent magnitude at the time. By late March, the comet started to fade away rapidly, until it was last observed within the constellation Orion on 24 April 1883.
