= 54P/de Vico–Swift–NEAT =

Periodic comet

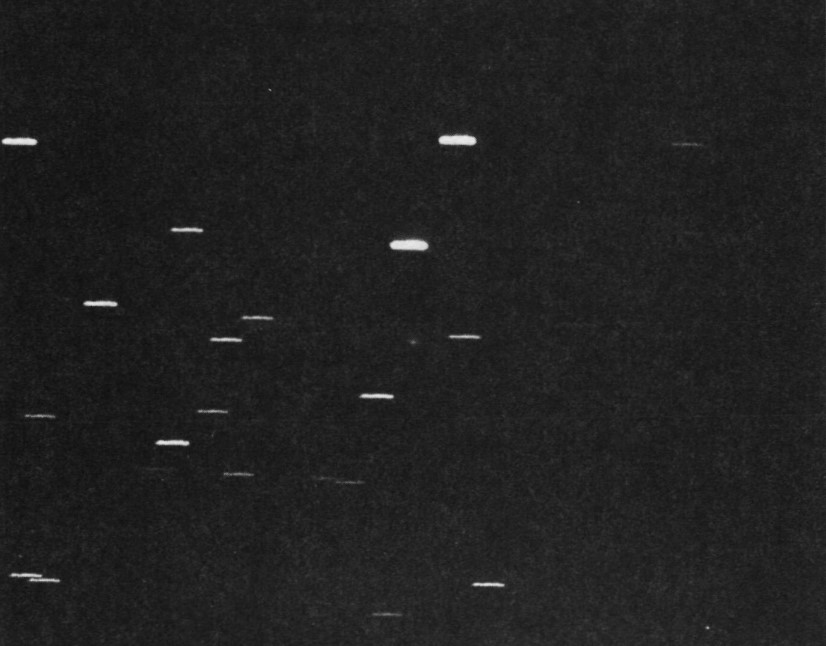
- 54P/V–S–N photographed from the US Naval Observatory on 4 August 1965

Discovery
- Discovered by: Francesco de Vico; Edward D. Swift; NEAT
- Discovery site: Rome, Italy
- Discovery date: 23 August 1844

Designations
- MPC designation: P/1844 Q1, P/1894 W1; P/1965 M1, P/2002 T4
- Alternative designations: 1844 I, 1894 IV; 1965 VII, 1894e, 1965e

Orbital characteristics
- Epoch: 17 October 2024 (JD 2460600.5)
- Observation arc: 130.01 years
- Number of observations: 406
- Aphelion: 5.40 AU
- Perihelion: 2.171 AU
- Semi-major axis: 3.786 AU
- Eccentricity: 0.42635
- Orbital period: 7.37 years
- Inclination: 6.064°
- Longitude of ascending node: 358.8°
- Argument of periapsis: 1.986°
- Mean anomaly: 5.760°
- Last perihelion: 3 September 2024
- Next perihelion: 2031-Dec-01
- T_{Jupiter}: 2.908
- Earth MOID: 1.172 AU
- Jupiter MOID: 0.097 AU

Physical characteristics
- Mean diameter: ≤ 4.2 km (2.6 mi)
- Comet total magnitude (M1): 14.2
- Comet nuclear magnitude (M2): 17.2

54P/de Vico–Swift–NEAT is a periodic comet in the Solar System first discovered by Father Francesco de Vico (Rome, Italy) on 23 August 1844. It has become a lost comet several times after its discovery. The comet makes numerous close approaches to Jupiter. The comet was last observed on 3 December 2024.

== Observational history ==
=== First discovery (1844) ===
Independent discoveries were made by Melhop (Hamburg, Germany) on 6 September and by Hamilton Lanphere Smith (Cleveland, Ohio, USA) on 10 September.

Paul Laugier and Felix Victor Mauvais calculated an orbit on 9 September 1844, and noted that a similarity existed with comets seen in previous years, by including 289P/Blanpain of 1819, into their calculations, they came up with an orbital period of between 4.6 and 4.9 years.

Hervé Faye (Paris, France) computed the first elliptical orbit on 16 September 1844, and the orbital period as 5.46 years.

The comet was considered lost as subsequent predicted returns after 1844 were never observed.

=== Second discovery (1894) ===
Edward D. Swift (Echo Mountain, California, USA) rediscovered the comet on 21 November 1894. Adolf Berberich suggested the comet might be the same as de Vico's comet on the basis of the comet's location and direction of motion.

After 1894, the comet was considered lost again after the 1901 and 1907 returns remained unseen, mainly due to perturbations caused by another close approach of Jupiter in 1897.

=== Third discovery (1965) ===
In 1963, Brian G. Marsden used a computer to link the 1844 and 1894 sightings and calculated a favourable return in 1965. The comet was subsequently recovered by Arnold Klemola (Yale-Columbia Southern Observatory, Argentina) on 30June 1965, at magnitude 17.

The comet made another close approach to Jupiter in 1968, which increased its perihelion distance and orbital period. As a result, its most favorable apparitions is expected to be no brighter than 18. The comet was not observed for subsequent predictions, by 1995 it was again considered lost.

=== Fourth discovery (2002) ===
The Near-Earth Asteroid Tracking (NEAT) program rediscovered the comet on 11 October 2002. The LINEAR program (New Mexico) found several prediscovery images from 4 October. It was confirmed as a return of comet 54P/de Vico–Swift by Kenji Muraoka (Kochi, Japan).

=== 2009 apparition ===
On 17 August 2009, comet 54P/de Vico–Swift–NEAT was recovered, while it was 2.3 AU (340 million km) from the Sun.

Numbered comets
Previous; 53P/Van Biesbroeck	54P/de Vico–Swift–NEAT	Next; 55P/Tempel–Tuttle
