= Edward D. Swift =

American astronomer (1870–1935)

Edward Doane Swift (24 December 1870 – 25 September 1935 in Buffalo, New York) was an American astronomer. Like his father Lewis, he was a founder member of the British Astronomical Association in 1890, resigning 1892.

== Early years ==
Edward D. Swift was the youngest son of the astronomer Lewis A. Swift and born during his father's second marriage to Caroline Doane Topping. At the age of almost two years, his family moved to Rochester, New York, as his father hoped his hardware business would improve in a larger city.

== Collaboration with father ==
The astronomical collaboration between Edward and his father began with the inauguration of a newly built observatory including a sixteen-inch refracting telescope in 1883. In the following years, many of Lewis Swift's publications are brief references to Edward. Most notably, Edward discovered 25 new NGC-objects, 22 new IC-objects, multiple comets and a total of 46 nebulae. He also followed in his father's footsteps by co-discovering the periodic comet 54P/de Vico-Swift-NEAT.

== See also ==
- Category:Discoveries by Edward Swift
- New General Catalogue
