= Lewis A. Swift =

American astronomer (1820–1913)

Lewis Swift
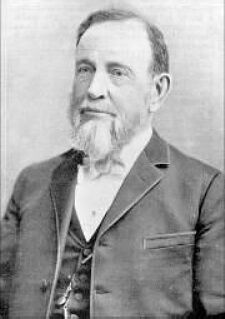
- Born: February 29, 1820; Clarkson, New York
- Died: January 5, 1913 (aged 92); Marathon, New York
- Occupation: Astronomer
- Relatives: Edward D. Swift (son)
- Honours: Honorary Ph.D. from University of Rochester; Laplace Medel from Société astronomique de France; Jackson-Gwilt Medal from Royal Astronomical Society

Lewis A. Swift (February 29, 1820 – January 5, 1913) was an American astronomer who discovered 13 comets and 1,248 previously uncatalogued nebulae. Only William Herschel discovered more nebulae visually.

== Discoveries ==
Swift discovered or co-discovered a number of comets, including periodic comets 11P/Tempel-Swift-LINEAR, 64P/Swift-Gehrels, and 109P/Swift-Tuttle (parent body of the Perseids meteor shower). He also discovered comets C/1877 G2, C/1878 N1, C/1879 M1, C/1881 J1, C/1881 W1, C/1892 E1, D/1895 Q1 (also known as D/Swift, whose debris stream Mariner 4 probably encountered on September 15, 1967), C/1896 G1 and C/1899 E1, and co-discovered C/1883 D1 (Brooks-Swift). Note, however, comet 54P/de Vico-Swift-NEAT was discovered by his son Edward D. Swift rather than by him.

He discovered his last comet at the age of 79. He was one of the few people to see Comet Halley at two of its appearances, 76 years apart (see also: External Link).

In 1878 he believed he had observed two Vulcan-type planets (planets within the orbit of Mercury), but he was mistaken.

Apart from comets, he also discovered hundreds of nebulae, such as IC 289, and galaxies, such as NGC 6, NGC 19 and NGC 27. He independently observed NGC 17, leading to its separate listing in the New General Catalogue as NGC 34.

== Life ==
According to Swift, he first became interested in astronomy as young boy after observing the Great Comet of 1843 while on his way to school in Clarkson, New York. His teacher initially dismissed his observation, but three days later the 'discovery' of the comet was announced.

Swift conducted his early observations in Rochester, NY, 'lain out in the snow' in an alley on Ambrose Street or on the roof of Duffy's Cider Mill. Later he gained a patron in the Rochester patent medicine businessman Hulbert Harrington Warner, who financed the building of an observatory for Swift. A fund of $13,000 was raised to purchase a 16-inch telescope for Swift.

Warner went bankrupt in the Panic of 1893, which ended his financial support, and Swift then went to California to become director of Mount Lowe Observatory, taking the 16 inch telescope with him.

He was married twice, first to Lucretia Hunt in 1850 and then to Carrie D. Topping in 1864. Edward D. Swift was his son by the latter wife.

== Honors ==
Swift received an honorary Ph.D. from the University of Rochester in 1879.

Swift received more medals than any other astronomer of his time including three made of gold from the Austrian Academy of Sciences in Vienna, four made of bronze from the Astronomical Society of the Pacific, and the Laplace Medal from the Société astronomique de France (the French Astronomical Society). In 1897 he was the first person awarded the Jackson-Gwilt Medal of the Royal Astronomical Society.

The asteroid 5035 Swift is named in his honour, as is the lunar crater Swift.
