= Thaddeus S. C. Lowe =

American aeronaut, scientist and inventor (1832–1913)

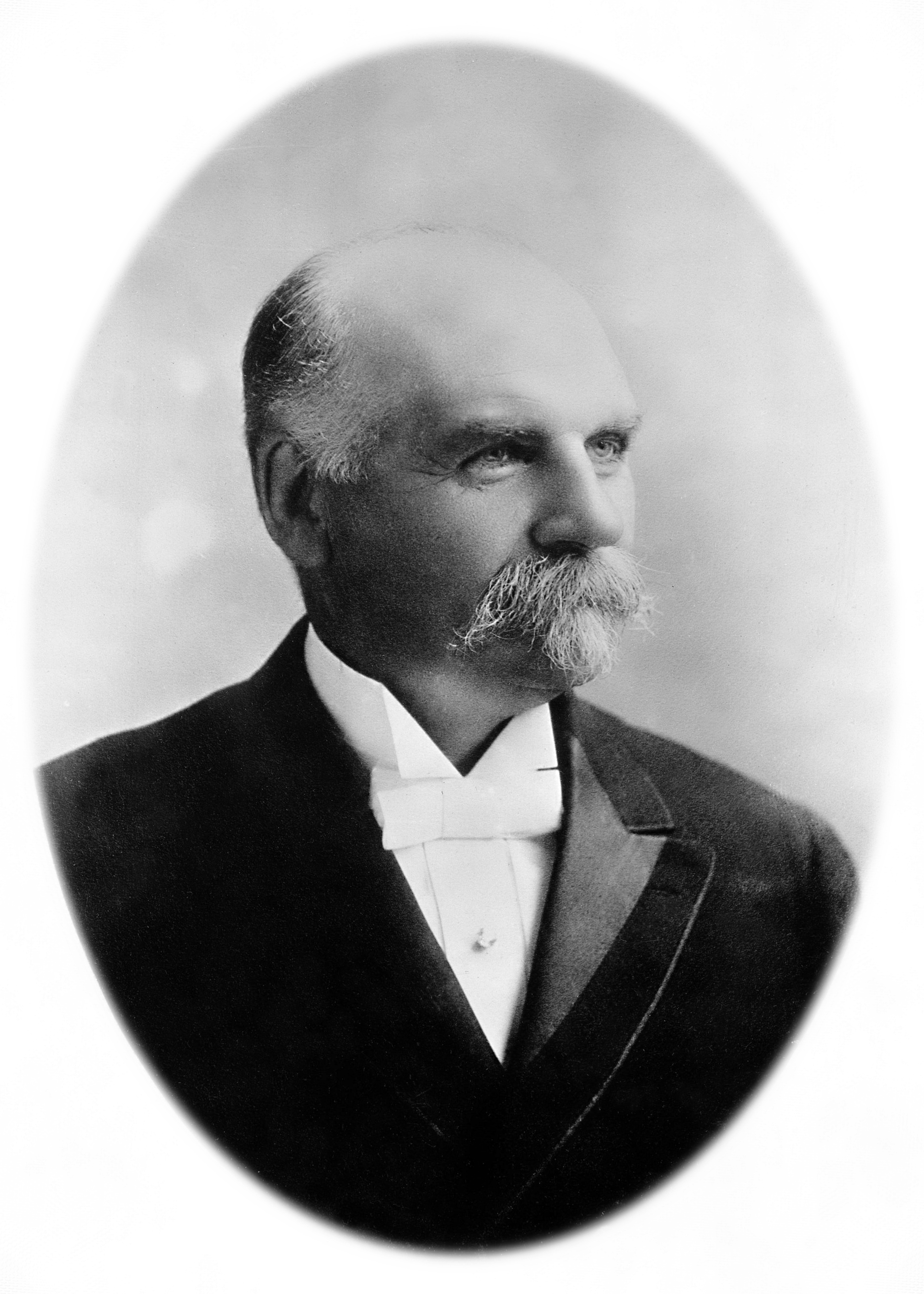
- Thaddeus Lowe, c. 1890
- Born: Thaddeus Sobieski Constantine Lowe; August 20, 1832; Jefferson, New Hampshire, U.S.
- Died: January 16, 1913 (aged 80); Pasadena, California, U.S.
- Known for: Aeronautics; Civil War Ballooning; Water Gas development Mount Lowe Railway, Pasadena, CA.
- Awards: Elliott Cresson Medal (1886) (Benjamin Franklin Institute of Sciences, Philadelphia)
- Scientific career
- Fields: Chemistry, Aeronautics, Meteorology
- Workplaces: Founder, Union Army Balloon Corps, 1861–1863
- Doctoral advisor: Prof. Joseph Henry, Smithsonian Institution

Thaddeus Sobieski Constantine Lowe (August 20, 1832 – January 16, 1913), also known as Professor T. S. C. Lowe, was an American Civil War aeronaut, scientist and inventor, mostly self-educated in the fields of chemistry, meteorology, and aeronautics, and the father of military aerial reconnaissance in the United States. By the late 1850s he was well known for his advanced theories in the meteorological sciences as well as his balloon building. Among his aspirations were plans for a transatlantic flight.

Lowe's scientific endeavors were cut short by the onset of the American Civil War, for which he offered his services performing aerial reconnaissance on the Confederate troops for the Union Army. In July 1861 Lowe was appointed Chief Aeronaut of the Union Army Balloon Corps by President Abraham Lincoln. Though his work was generally successful, it was not fully appreciated by all members of the military, and disputes over his operations and pay scale forced him to resign in 1863. Lowe returned to the private sector and continued his scientific exploration of hydrogen gas manufacturing. He invented the water gas process by which large amounts of hydrogen gas could be produced from steam and coke. His inventions and patents on this process and ice making machines made him a millionaire.

In 1887, he moved to Los Angeles, and eventually built a 24,000 ft^{2} (2,200 m^{2}) home in Pasadena. He opened several ice-making plants and founded Citizen's Bank of Los Angeles. Lowe was introduced to David J. Macpherson, a civil engineer, who had drawn up plans for a scenic mountain railroad. In 1891 they incorporated the Pasadena & Mount Wilson Railroad Co. and began the construction of what became the Mount Lowe Railway into the hills above Altadena. The railway opened on July 4, 1893, and was met with quick interest and success. Lowe continued construction toward Oak Mountain, renamed Mount Lowe, at an exhausting rate, both physically and financially. By 1899 Lowe had gone into receivership and eventually lost the railway to Jared S. Torrance. Lowe's fortunes had been all but lost, and he lived out his remaining days at his daughter's home in Pasadena, where he died at age 80.

== Early life and education ==
Lowe was born August 20, 1832, to Clovis and Alpha Green Lowe in Jefferson, New Hampshire. Lowe's grandfather, Levi Lowe, fought in the Revolutionary War, and his father was a drummer boy in the War of 1812. Both Clovis and Alpha were native New Hampshirites, of pioneer stock and descendants of 17th century Pilgrims. Clovis was a cobbler, but later became a merchant in Jefferson. He dabbled in politics and was even elected to state legislature at one time. His politics and opinion were well respected in the state.

Versions of the life of young Thaddeus vary. He was the second child in a family of five and was named Thaddeus Sobieski Constantine, more than likely after the character Thaddeus Constantine Sobieski (Tadeusz Kosciuszko) in an 1803 novel Thaddeus of Warsaw by Scottish author Jane Porter. His circumstances around the age of ten are uncertain; either his mother had died and Clovis married Mary Randall, or Lowe was sent away to another farm during which time his mother died and his father remarried. He apparently did work for another farm owned by the Plaisteds, but whether or not he lived there is uncertain. Clovis and Mary had seven more children, but there is a timeline confusion that may indicate she already had children when she married Clovis.

What is consistent in the stories of Lowe are accounts of his insatiable appetite for learning. He could not read enough material, and he had questions beyond the answering of his father or teachers. Lowe was also limited in the amount of time he had for school. His farm chores allowed him only three winter months to attend Common School at Jefferson Mills, two miles away. The school had no books, but, like Abraham Lincoln, Thad spent his evenings in front of the fireplace reading books loaned from his teacher's personal library.

By age fourteen, Thad had ventured out on his own: first to Portland, Maine, then back to Boston where he joined his older brother Joseph in the shoe [parts] cutting trade. At eighteen, Thad became quite ill and returned home. While he was still recuperating, his younger brother invited him to attend a chemistry lecture by one Professor Reginald Dinkelhoff featuring the phenomenon of lighter-than-air gases, specifically hydrogen. When Dinkelhoff requested a volunteer from the audience, an eager Thaddeus jumped to the fore. Dinkelhoff could see the interest in his eyes and after the show offered to take him on the road with him as an assistant. Lowe did so and after two years, upon the professor's retirement, bought out the show using the appellation "Thaddeus Sobieski Coulincourt Lowe, Professor of Chemistry."

=== Self-made scientist and aeronaut ===
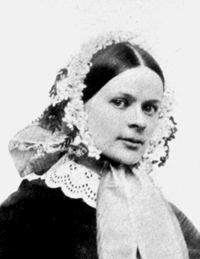
Leontine Augustine Gaschon Lowe

The lecture circuit business proved lucrative enough for Lowe to seek out the education he so lacked as a child. He tried studying medicine to fulfill his grandmother's wish, but the boredom redirected him to his first interest, aviation with the use of lighter-than-air gases. American balloonists used coke gas to inflate limp silk bags, as opposed to the original French balloons which were cotton weave over rigid frameworks that were stood over fires to collect hot smoke (hot air). By the late 1850s, Lowe had become a foremost balloon builder and continued his lucrative business as a showman giving balloon rides to passersby and funfair attendees.

In 1855, at one of his lectures, he was introduced to a pretty Parisian actress, 19-year-old Leontine Augustine Gaschon. Her father was a palace guard of King Louis Phillipe who fled to the U.S. as a political refugee. A week later, on February 14, 1855, Thaddeus and Leontine wed. Their union produced ten children, seven girls and three boys. Lowe continued with his scientific endeavors and the dream of owning his own balloon with the wild idea of making a transatlantic flight via the high winds he observed. He pored over the book A System of Aeronautics by John Wise, which had specific instructions for the construction of aerostats including the cutting, the sewing, the leak proofing.

In 1857, Lowe built and piloted his first balloon in tethered flight at a small farm in Hoboken, New Jersey. Thad's father joined in the balloon making business and had become an accomplished aeronaut himself. In 1858 the Lowes built the larger balloon Enterprise and several others.

On June 17, 1858, he made a successful public ascension in Ottawa, Canada West, after an unsuccessful May 24th attempt. During this and another September 1st ascension he appeared under the name Monsieur Carlincourt (T.S.C. Lowe)

Lowe continued with his scientific endeavors and avocation to make a transatlantic flight via the high-altitude winds later known as the jet stream. In 1859, Lowe began the construction of a mammoth balloon to be named the City of New York. Meanwhile, he promoted the theory of transatlantic flight to many who had stock market interests in Europe. The recently laid transatlantic cable had failed, and sea travel was undependably slow. He amassed supporters from all corners of the business and scientific communities, in particular one Prof. Joseph Henry of the Smithsonian Institution, who wrote:

The Smithsonian Institution has long been aware of the work and theories of Professor Lowe and we have found his statements scientifically sound. It is with great pleasure and satisfaction that we welcome proof of his genius. We shall follow the outcome of his plan with interest.

=== Transatlantic attempts ===
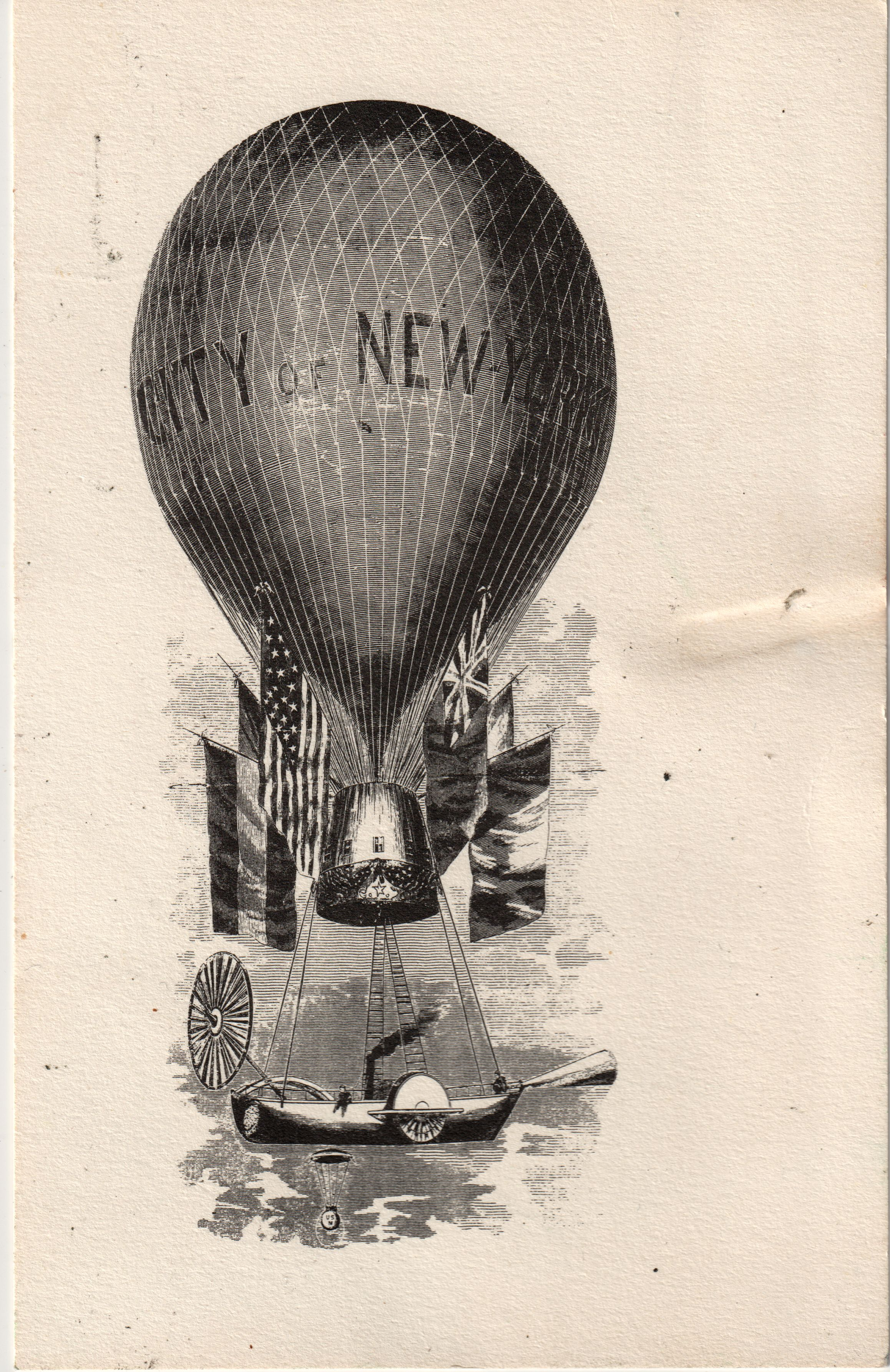
Lowe's mammoth balloon the City of New York, later named Great Western, to be used in a transatlantic flight

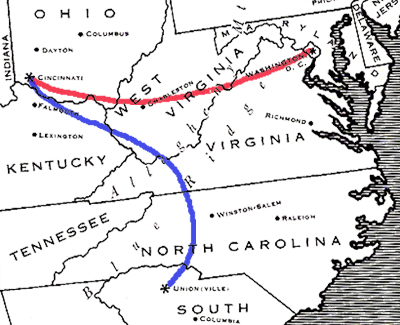
Lowe's intended flight from Cincinnati shown in red. Actual flight in blue.

Lowe's latest balloon, the City of New York, was a massive 103-foot (31 m) diameter balloon with an 11 1/2-ton (10,433 kg) lift capacity (on coke gas, 22 1/2 ton (20,412 kg) on hydrogen), which included a 20-foot (6.1 m) diameter, eight-man canvas-covered gondola and a suspended lifeboat named for his wife Leontine. It was prepared for a test flight to be launched at Reservoir Square in New York on November 1, 1859. Unfortunately the local gas company was not able to deliver a sufficient supply of gas. Within a week Lowe was invited to Philadelphia by Prof. John C. Cresson of the Benjamin Franklin Institute of Sciences, who also happened to be chairman of the board of the Point Breeze Gas Works. They promised a sufficient supply of gas. Lowe stored the balloon in Hoboken and waited for spring to do the test flight.

Before the test flight the balloon was renamed the Great Western, on the advice of newspaperman Horace Greeley, to rival the maiden voyage of the steamship Great Eastern in the spring of 1860. Lowe made the flight successfully on June 28, 1860, from Philadelphia to New Jersey, but on his first attempt at a transatlantic launch on September 7, the Great Western was ripped open by a wind. A second attempt on September 29 was halted when the repaired spot on the balloon bulged during inflation. Lowe would need to overhaul the Great Western and wait for the next late spring.

A second test flight, at the suggestion of Prof. Henry, was made from Cincinnati and was to return him to the eastern seaboard. For this flight he used the smaller balloon Enterprise. His flight took off on the early morning of April 19, 1861, two days after Virginia had seceded from the Union. The flight misdirected him to Unionville, SC, where he was put under house arrest as a Yankee spy. Having established his identity as a man of science, he was allowed to return home, where he had received word from Secretary of the Treasury Salmon P. Chase to come to Washington with his balloon. The American Civil War permanently ended Lowe's attempt at a transatlantic crossing.

== Participation in the Civil War (1861–1863) ==
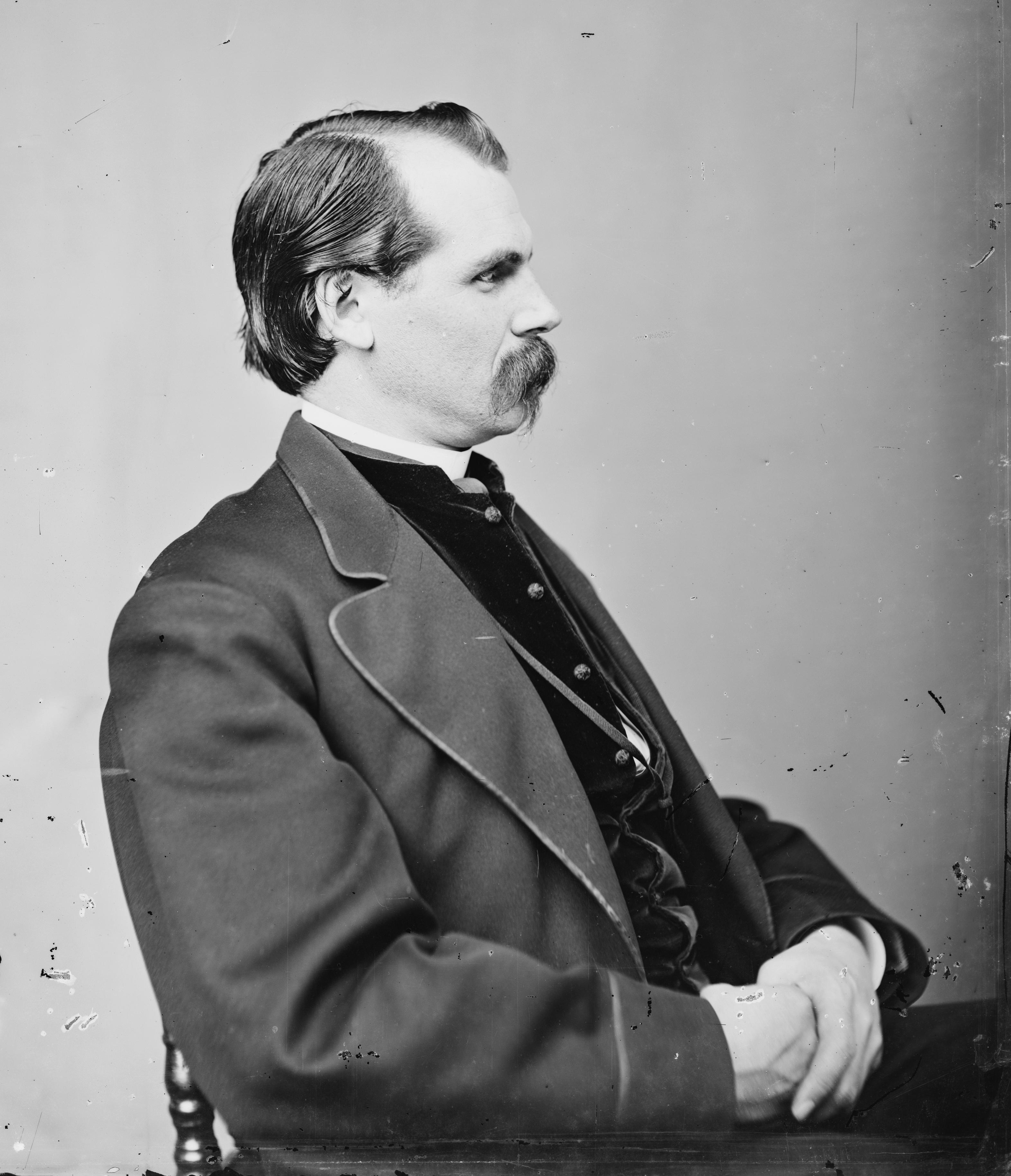
Thaddeus S. C. Lowe, c. 1865

=== Chief Aeronaut ===
On the evening of June 11, 1861, Lowe met President Lincoln and offered to perform a demonstration with the Enterprise and a telegraph set from a height some 500 feet (150 m) above the White House. Lowe's telegraph message to the President during the June 16, 1861 demonstration read:

I have the pleasure of sending you this first dispatch ever telegraphed from an aerial station...

Lowe was competing for the position with four other prominent balloonists, John Wise, John LaMountain, and brothers Ezra Allen and James Allen. Wise and LaMountain were old critics of Lowe, but were not able to obtain the assignment so easily.

Lowe's first outing was at the First Battle of Bull Run, with General Irvin McDowell and the Army of Northeastern Virginia. After a reconnaissance of Confederate positions, Lowe was returning to his own lines and shot at by Union pickets, who apparently did not recognize him or his balloon. This forced him to land behind enemy lines instead. Fortunately he was found by members of the 31st New York Volunteers before the enemy could discover him, but after landing, he had twisted his ankle and was not able to walk out with them. They returned to Fort Corcoran to report his position. Eventually his wife Leontine, disguised as an old hag, came to his rescue with a buckboard and canvas covers and was able to extract him and his equipment safely.

Word of his exploits got back to the President, who ordered General Winfield Scott to see to Lowe's formation of a balloon corps, with Lowe as Chief Aeronaut. It was almost four months before Lowe received orders and provisions to construct four (eventually seven) balloons equipped with mobile hydrogen gas generators. At the same time he assembled a band of men whom he instructed in the methodology of military ballooning. The newly-formed Union Army Balloon Corps remained a civilian contract organization, never receiving military commissions, a dangerous position lest any one of the men be captured as spies and summarily executed.

=== Peninsula Campaign ===
Lowe returned to the Army of the Potomac now under General George McClellan, with his new military balloon the Eagle, though his generators were not ready. He performed ascensions over Yorktown, after which the Confederates retreated toward Richmond. Lowe was given use of a converted coal barge, the George Washington Parke Custis, onto which he loaded two new balloons and two new hydrogen gas generators, with which Lowe performed the first observations over water thereby making the GWP Custis the first ever aircraft carrier. In Lowe's Official Report to the Secretary of War, he stated:

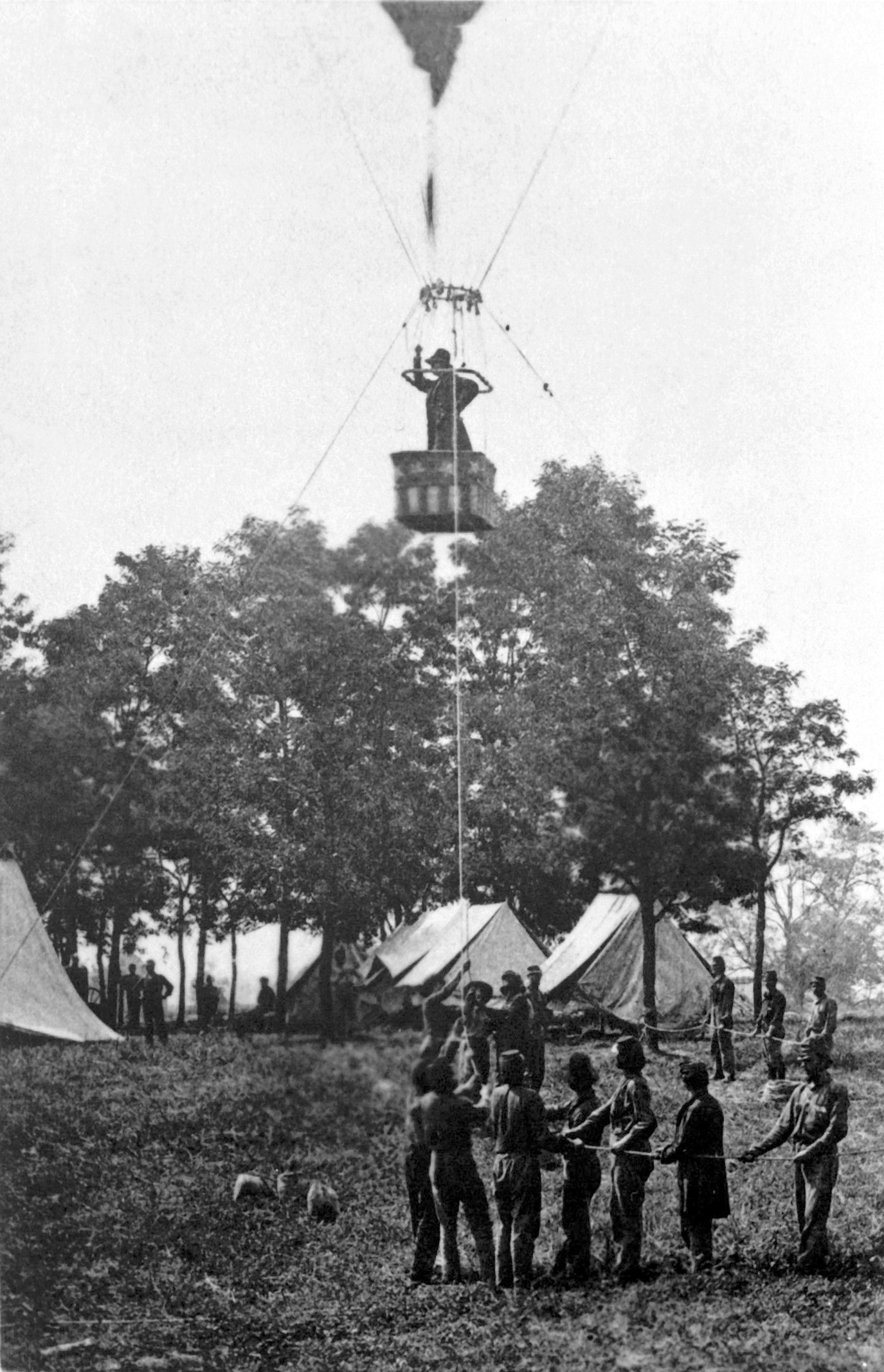
Prof. Lowe ascending in the Intrepid to observe the Battle of Fair Oaks

I have the pleasure of reporting the complete success of the first balloon expedition by water ever attempted.

Lowe went on to serve in the Peninsula Campaign of 1862, making observations over Mechanicsville, Virginia, and the ensuing Battle of Seven Pines or Fair Oaks. This particular battle marks a pivotal moment where conflicting intelligence reports between Lowe (in the air) and Pinkerton (scouting on the ground) gave vastly different accounts on the number of Confederate troops. It is believed that had McClellan valued Lowe's intelligence over Pinkerton's, the Confederacy could have been dealt a "knockout blow" to its forces.

Lowe's ascent in the Intrepid over the Battle of Seven Pines, where he observed the oncoming Confederate Army and reported troop movements in a timely manner, saved the isolated army of General Samuel P. Heintzelman. Though he had used the hydrogen gas generators (each balloon camp was assigned two generator units), the inflation time was still another hour off. He quickly transferred the gas from the Constitution into the Intrepid by cutting a hole in the bottom of a camp kettle and connecting the balloons at the valve ends. The process took fifteen minutes, a time savings later valued at "a million dollars a minute."

The muddy bogs around Fair Oaks and the Chickahominy River gave rise to many exotic diseases such as typhoid and malaria. Lowe contracted malaria and was put out of service for more than a month. The unsuccessful Army of the Potomac was ordered to retreat to Washington, and Lowe's wagons and mules were commandeered for the withdrawal and eventually returned to the Quartermaster. When Lowe returned to Washington, he was hard-pressed to be put back into service. Eventually, he was called to Sharpsburg and Fredericksburg, where his services were used.

=== End of the Balloon Corps ===
The Balloon Corps was reassigned to the Engineers Corps. Lowe had been paid as a colonel ($10 gold per day), but in March 1863, Captain Cyrus B. Comstock was put in charge of the newly reassigned air division and cut Lowe's pay to $6 cash ($3 gold). At the same time, a Congressional assessment was being made of the air division and a disparaging third party report, which Lowe refuted in a lengthy response, gave pause to the Union commanders for further use of balloons. In addition, Lowe's appointments of personnel independent of the engineer officers had strained his relations with the military. Lowe tendered his resignation in May 1863 and the Allen brothers took charge of the Balloon Corps, but by August, the Corps had ceased to exist.

== Return to the private sector ==
Lowe sought to recuperate from the effects of malaria and the fatigue of war. He and Leontine returned to Jefferson, New Hampshire, where he spent time with his family. He had a month's return to Washington in the fall of 1863 to complete his war report to the Secretary, then returned home to buy a farm near Valley Forge, where the farming life allowed him to recompose himself.

As the advanced techniques of aerial reconnaissance developed by Lowe became influential around the world, Great Britain, France and Brazil offered him the position of major-general if he were to organize a balloon corps for them. Having had enough of war, he declined the offer, but he did send them a balloon with equipment including portable generators. He consulted with their military experts and recruited his best aeronauts, the Allen brothers, to assist them. James and Ezra Allen formed the Brazilian Balloon Corps using two of Lowe's balloons, one 12.2 m to carry 6–8 people, and another 8.5 m in diameter to carry 2 persons.

During his Civil War days, Lowe had met Count Ferdinand von Zeppelin, who was at the time acting as a military observer of the war. General McClellan had put all balloon ride-alongs off limits, so Lowe sent von Zeppelin to Poolesville to visit his German assistant aeronaut John Steiner, who could entertain him in his own language. Von Zeppelin returned in the 1870s to interview Lowe on all of his aeronautic techniques. Count von Zeppelin later designed the dirigible aircraft that bore his name.

Lowe made a new home in Norristown, Pennsylvania, where he continued with his scientific endeavors with hydrogen gas, improving upon and patenting the water gas process by which high volumes of the volatile fuel could be made from passing steam over hot coal. The industry revolutionized home heating and lighting along the eastern seaboard. He held several patents on ice making machines, including his perfected "Compression Ice Machine" which revolutionized the cold storage industry. He also discovered that gas burning through a platinum mantle produced a bright illumination (as later found in the Coleman lantern).

He bought an old steamship in which he installed his refrigerating units and began shipping fresh fruit from New York to Galveston, and fresh beef back. This was an historical first where people were able to eat fresh beef that hadn't been packed in preservative salts. His steamship venture failed due to his lack of knowledge about shipping, but the industry was picked up by several other countries.

Lowe also manufactured products that ran on hydrogen gas. With these and his several patents, Lowe amassed a fortune. For his achievements, Lowe received the coveted Elliott Cresson Medal for the Invention Held to be Most Useful to Mankind.

== Lowe's gas process ==
In 1873, Lowe developed and patented the Lowe's water gas process which is a modification of the water gas process by which large amounts of hydrogen enriched gas could be generated for residential and commercial use in heating and lighting. Unlike the common coal gas, or coke gas which was used in municipal service, this gas provided a more efficient heating fuel that was also suitable for illumination. The basic water gas reaction is:

C + H_{2}O → CO + H_{2}

The Lowe process is a three-stage modified water gas process in which 'blue' water gas is modified by addition of pyrolized oils to render a yellow flame usable for domestic lighting as well as heating. Blue water gas is a term used for water gas produced from clean-burning fuels such as anthracite, coke and charcoal and produces a blue flame.

The Lowe process is performed in a series of three chambers, the generator, the carburettor and the superheater. The original air blast is used to produce air gas in the generator. The heat of primary combustion heats the coal sufficiently, while the air gas is burned by a second air blast in the other two chambers in which the oil for carburetting is decomposed. These chambers contain a quantity of loose fire brick called "checker work," and the air gas is burned in them during the time the air blast is on the main producer. When the coal and checker work are hot enough, the air blast is shut off and the steam blast is turned on. Heat stored in the checker work pyrolyzes the mixture of water gas and oil, which is led through the chambers while the steam blast is on the producers. The Lowe process is endothermic, and cools the generator and checker work, so the process has to alternate between air blast for heating and steam blast for gas production.

The process spurred on the industry of gas manufacturing, and gasification plants were established quickly along the Eastern seaboard of the United States. Similar processes, like the Haber Process, led to the manufacture of ammonia (NH_{3}) by the combining of nitrogen, found in air, with high volumes of hydrogen. This spurred on the refrigeration industry which long used ammonia as its refrigerant. Prof. Lowe also held several patents on artificial ice making machines, and was able to run successful businesses in cold storage as well as products which operated on hydrogen gas.

== Retirement in Pasadena, California ==
In 1887, Lowe moved to Los Angeles and in 1890 to Pasadena, California, where he built a 24,000 square foot (2200 m^{2}) mansion. He started a water-gas company, founded the Citizens Bank of Los Angeles, established several ice plants, and bought a Pasadena opera house.

=== Mount Lowe Railway ===
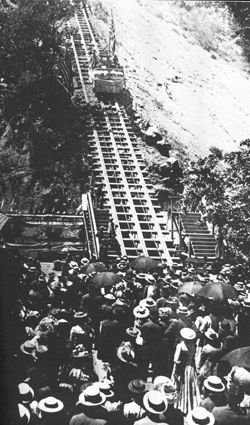
Great Incline of the Mount Lowe Railway on opening day, July 4, 1893. The band went up first playing "Nearer My God to Thee".

Early Pasadenans always had a dream of a scenic mountain railroad to the crest of the San Gabriel Mountains. David J. Macpherson, a civil engineer graduate of Cornell University, had the general plans for just such a railroad. He was introduced to Prof. Lowe with the idea of joining Macpherson's plans and Lowe's money together in one venture.

In 1891, Lowe and Macpherson incorporated the Pasadena & Mount Wilson Railroad (later the Mount Lowe Railway). Unable to obtain all the rights of way to Mt. Wilson, the two men redirected their railway toward Oak Mountain via the Echo promontory. The difference between this and any other scenic mountain railway of its kind was that it was an all-electric traction trolley (streetcar), the only one of its kind to ever exist. Oak Mountain was later renamed Mount Lowe, and to make it official, Andrew McNally, the co-founder of the map printing company Rand McNally who had moved to Altadena, had the name Mt. Lowe printed on all his maps.

Lowe opened the first section of the railway on July 4, 1893, from the corner of Lake and Calaveras in Altadena to the Rubio Pavilion in the Rubio Canyon, then transferring to a steep 2,800-foot (850 m) long funicular to Echo Mountain. At the top there was a 40-room chalet. In 1894, he added an 80-room hotel, the Echo Mountain House, and the observatory. By 1896, the upper division was finished into Grand Canyon at Ye Alpine Tavern. Altogether there were some seven miles (11 km) of track. Lowe lost the venture to receivership in 1899, which left him impoverished. The MLR became part of Henry Huntington's recently formed Pacific Electric Railway (also known as "Red Car") in 1902.

The only part of the railway property that remained Lowe's was the observatory on Echo Mountain. It boasted a 16-inch (410 mm) reflective telescope from which many astronomical finds were made. It was blown down in a gale in 1928. The railway fell in stages to the Echo Mountain House fire, a kitchen fire on February 4, 1900; a wind-aided brush fire on Echo Mountain in 1905, which wiped out everything except the observatory and the astronomer's cabin; a Rubio Canyon flash flood in 1909 that destroyed the Pavilion; and an electrical fire that razed the Tavern in 1936. The line was abandoned after the Los Angeles deluge of March 1938.

== Death and legacy ==
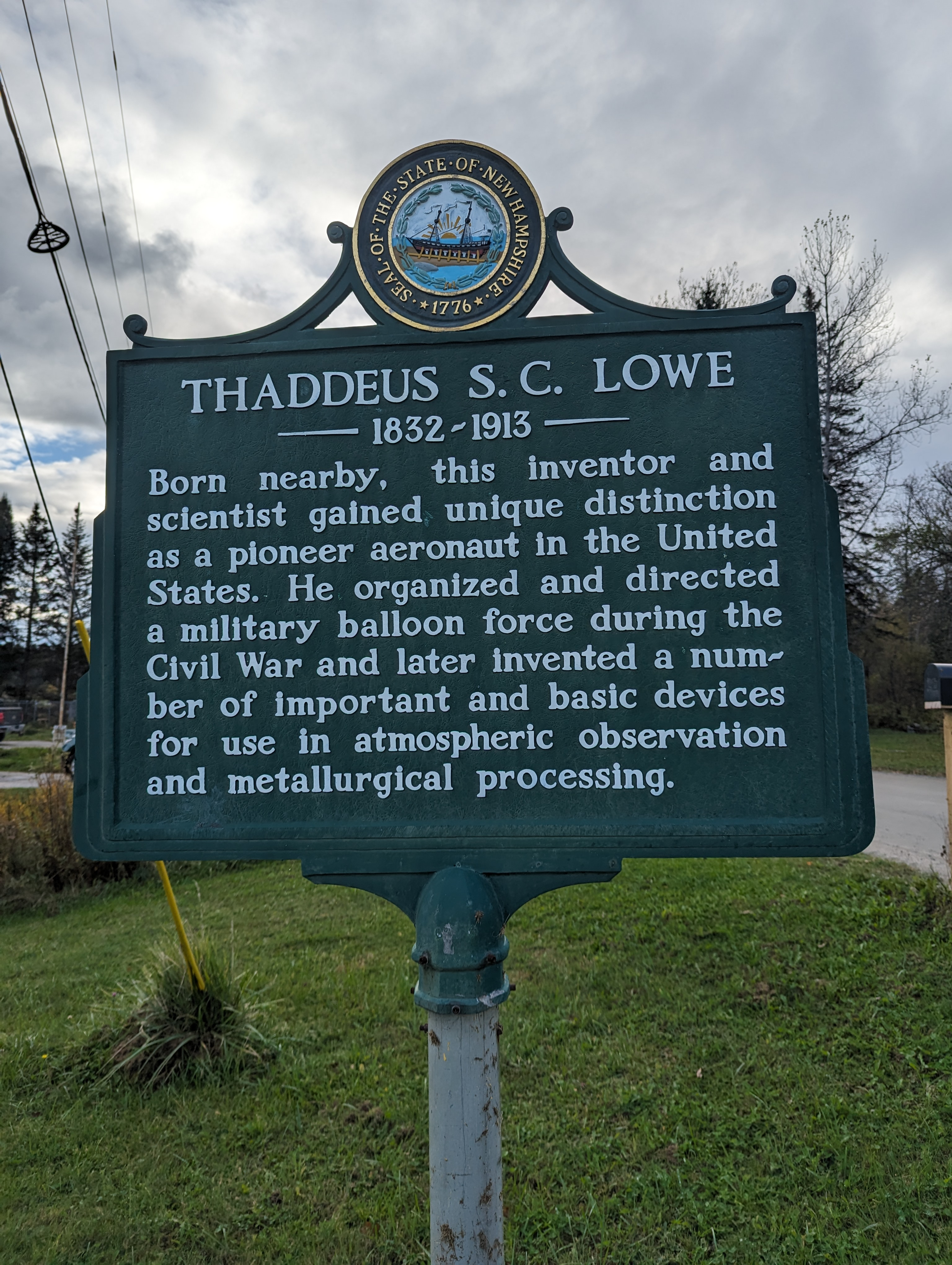
New Hampshire historical marker #19 for Lowe near his birthplace in Jefferson, New Hampshire.

Lowe died at his daughter's Pasadena home on January 16, 1913, at age 80, after a few years of failing health. Lowe was buried at Mountain View Cemetery in Altadena, California. His wife Leontine died a year earlier and is buried next to him. Also buried near the Lowe monument are their two sons, Leon and Sobieski, and other family members. Many of the family members returned to the East Coast. A nearby monument has been separately erected for his son Thaddeus and his wife. Thaddeus Lowe's granddaughter Pancho Lowe Barnes was also something of an aviation pioneer beginning in late-1920s California.

The Mount Lowe Railway was placed on the National Register of Historic Places on January 6, 1993. The mountain itself still bears his name. Lowe is a member of the U.S. Army Military Intelligence Hall of Fame. Lowe Army Heliport at Fort Rucker, Alabama, is named in his honor.

His house in Norristown, Pennsylvania, at 823 W. Main Street, still exists.

Lowe is featured on a New Hampshire historical marker (number 19) along U.S. Route 2 in Jefferson.

== Thaddeus Lowe in popular culture ==
Lowe was portrayed by Stuart Whitman in the movie High Flying Spy in 1972, produced by Walt Disney Productions. The movie was based on the 1967 Robert Edmond book High Spy. It aired as part of The Wonderful World of Disney and also starred Darren McGavin and Larry D. Mann.

The story of Lowe's Balloon Corps was the subject of an episode of Drunk History, with Greg Kinnear playing Lowe and Stephen Merchant playing President Lincoln.

The Civil War TV mini-series, The Blue and the Gray, features a scene with Thaddeus Lowe testing his observation balloon during the 1862 Peninsula campaign. Lowe is played by actor James Carroll Jordan.

== Bibliography ==
- Manning, Mike. Intrepid: An Account of Prof. T. S. C. Lowe, Civil War Aeronaut and Hero.
- Lowe, Thaddeus. Official Report (to the Secretary of War Edwin M. Stanton) (Parts I & II) (#11 & #12) O.R. – Series III – Volume III [S#124] Correspondence, Orders, Reports, and Returns of the Union Authorities From January 1 to December 31, 1863.
- Blitz, Matt (May 9, 2017). "The Man in the Balloon". Popular Mechanics.
- Block, Eugene B. (1966). Above the Civil War. OCLC 1329529.
- Hoehling, Mary (1958). Thaddeus Lowe, America's One-Man Air Corps.
- Seims, Charles (1976). Mount Lowe, The Railway in the Clouds.
- Evans, Charles M. (2002). The War of the Aeronauts: A History of Ballooning in the Civil War. Stackpole Books.
- Evans, Charles M. Air War Over Virginia. "an on-line publication"
- Manning, Mike (2001). Man, Mountain and Monument. Archived from the original on November 27, 2006.
- Poleskie, Stephen (2007). Frederic C. Beil (ed.). The Balloonist: The Story of T. S. C. Lowe – Inventor, Scientist, Magician, and Father of the U.S. Air Force.
- King, Samuel Archer (1900). "Lowe Thaddeus S. C." . In Wilson, J. G.; Fiske, J. (eds.). Appletons' Cyclopædia of American Biography. New York: D. Appleton.
