= Sam Merrill Trail =

Hiking trail in the San Gabriel Mountain Range, California

Coordinates: 34°13′11″N 118°07′14″W

- Length: 2.55 mi (4.10 km)
- Location: Angeles National Forest, near Altadena, California, US
- Trailheads: Top of Lake Avenue in Altadena; Echo Mountain
- Use: Hiking, Biking
- Highest point: Echo Mountain Promontory, 3,050 ft (930 m)
- Difficulty: Easy to moderately strenuous

The Sam Merrill Trail is a major hiking trail in the Las Flores Canyon of the San Gabriel Mountain Range north of Altadena, California, which leads to the top of Echo Mountain. It was built by Charles Warner and the Forest Conservation Club of Pasadena during the 1930s. After the deluge of 1938 most of the trails that accessed the mountain sides around Echo Mountain and the Mount Lowe Railway had been all but washed away. Sam Merrill found it important to maintain public hiking access to the railway ruins and other portions of the treacherous foothill. During the 1940s he overhauled and maintained the trail.

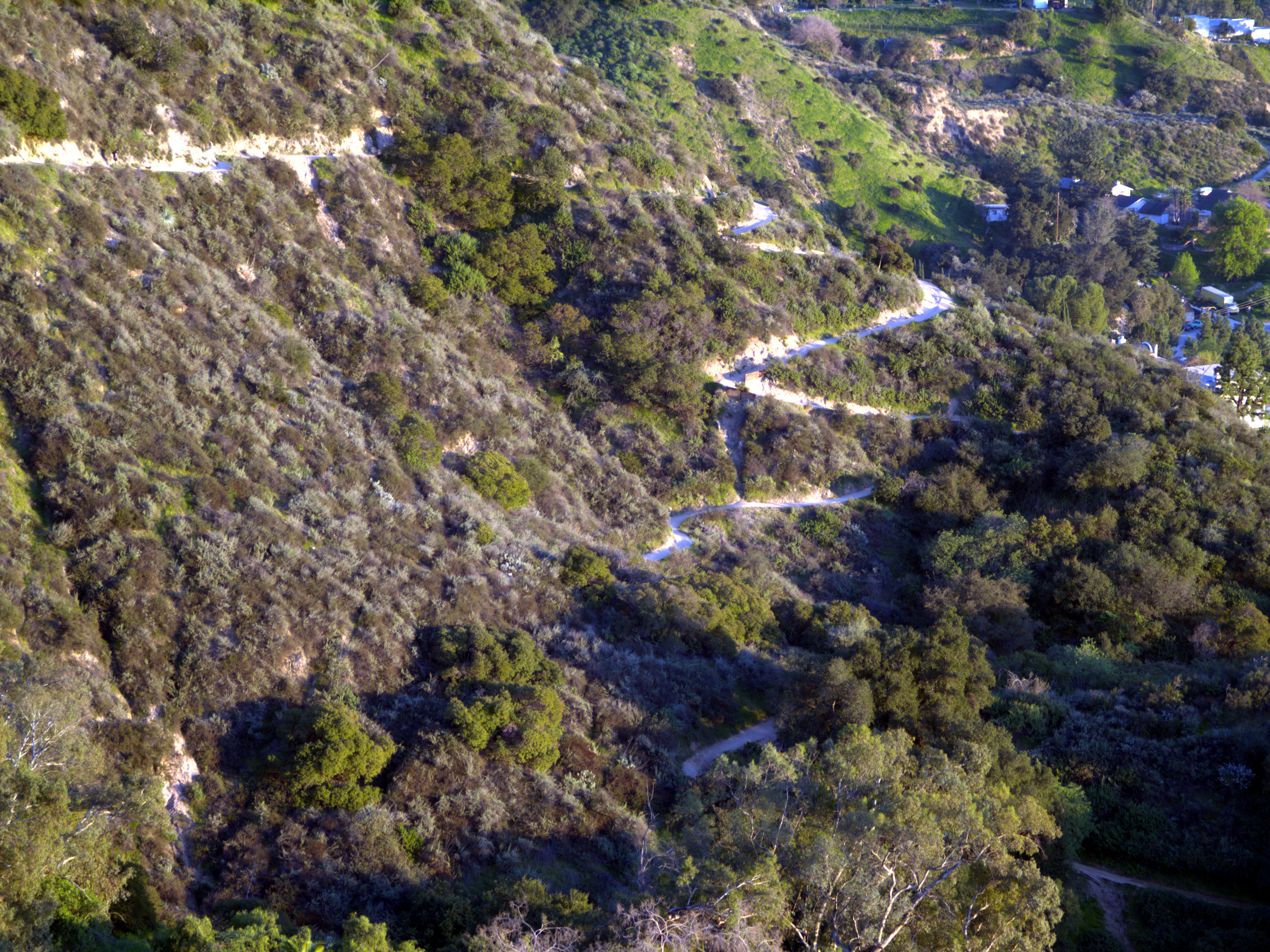
Switchbacks near the old Cobb Estate at the start of the trail.

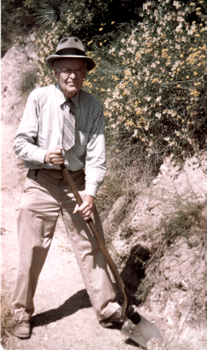
Merrill Works On His Trail

As a young man Merrill had lived with John Muir for a summer, which inspired a lifetime commitment to the outdoors and the Sierra Club. Merrill, who served as Clerk of the Superior Court of Los Angeles, was an active volunteer in the Sierra Club, leading outings for almost twenty years, serving on the Executive Committee of the Angeles Chapter from 1926 to 1935 and on the National Board of Directors of the Sierra Club from 1936 to 1937. When Sam Merrill died in 1948 the Sierra Club named the Echo Mountain Trail after him.

The trail originated at the old railway's right of way just above a point called Hygeia Station and climbed by switchbacks up the steep face of the Echo promontory. In the late 1960s a housing development was established over the trail, and the trailhead was moved to an access alongside the Cobb Estate gateway at the top of Lake Avenue.

The portion of the trail which was maintained by Merrill leads an approximate 2 1/2-mile trip directly to Echo Mountain and the ruins of the White City of the Mount Lowe Railway. It is also sometimes referred to as Lower Sam Merrill Trail because a section of the Mount Lowe 8, an old mule trail from the days of the Mount Lowe Tavern, was reopened, giving a continued hike into Grand Canyon and the site of the Tavern, and is referred to as Upper Sam Merrill Trail.

In 1996 the national USA Today newspaper published a list of "10 Great North American Hikes", which included the Sam Merrill Trail as one of them. The list had originally appeared in the October 1996 issue of Men's Fitness magazine.

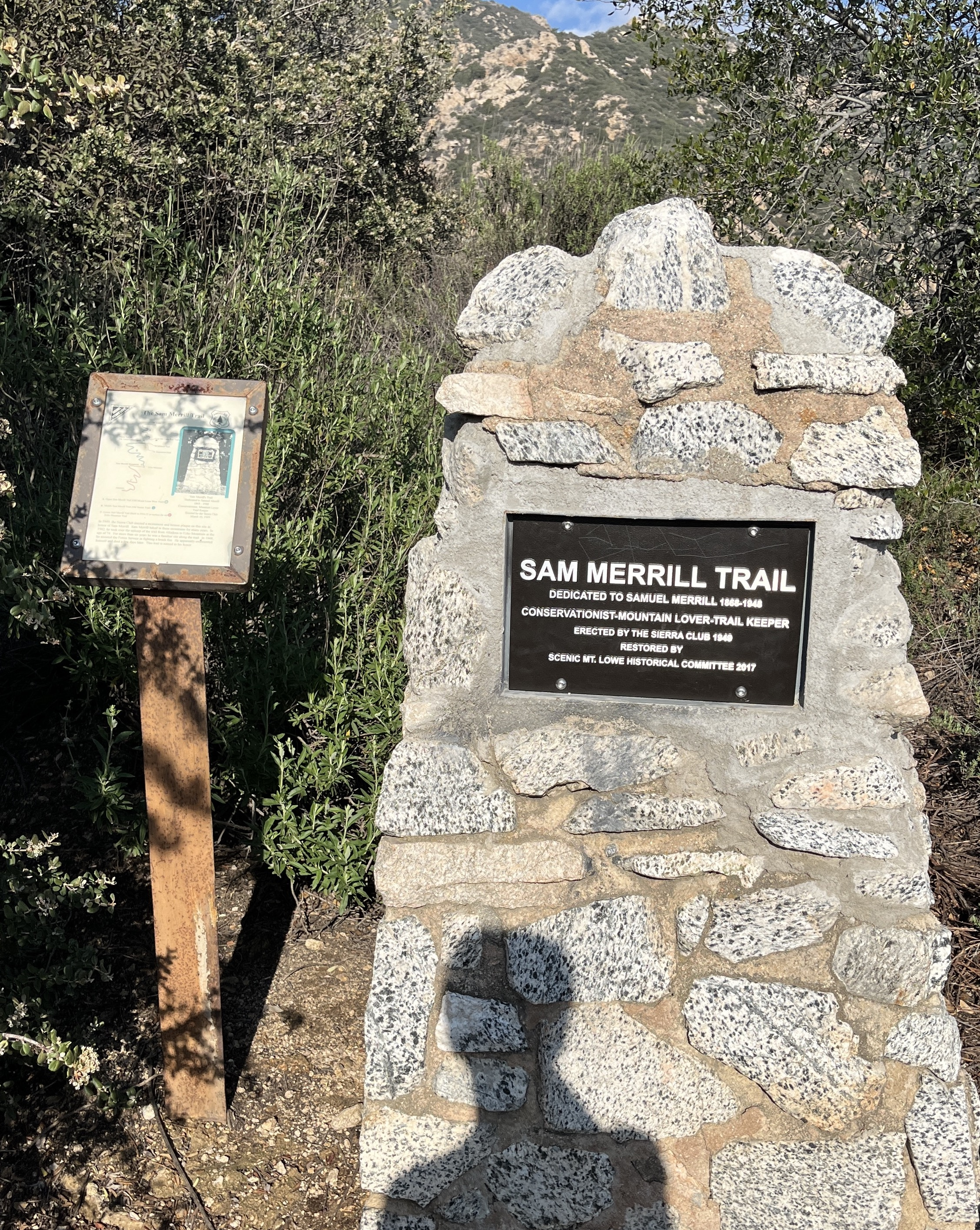
Trail monument on the Sam Merrill Trail

== Deaths ==
This is a partial list of deaths on this trail.

- June 2016 Margaret Cihocki collapsed and died.
- January 2017 Lee Brian Tracy, co-organizer and hike leader of So Cal Happy Hour Backpacking, fell off the trail and died.
