= Side Pie =

Pizzeria in Altadena, California

Restaurant information
- Established: 2021
- Closed: January 8, 2025 (temporarily)
- Owner: Kevin Hockin
- Food type: Pizza
- Location: Altadena, California
- Other information: Destroyed in the Eaton Fire in January 2025

Side Pie was a pizza restaurant in Altadena, California that began during the COVID-19 pandemic of 2020 as a pop-up in the yard of the Altadena home of owner-chef Kevin Hockin and his wife, Rosanna Kvernmo.

== History ==
On March 19, 2020, Hockin closed Collage Coffee, his shop in the Highland Park section of Los Angeles, telling customers he would reopen when the pandemic abated. He built a wood-fired brick oven in the sideyard of his Altadena home and, with the help of two other chefs, opened Side Pie, serving thin-crust pizza through a slot cut into his fence. The restaurant was publicized via an Instagram page and quickly developed a clientele. A neighbor's complaint to the Los Angeles County Department of Public Health eventually led to the restaurant's closing. Hockin reopened Side Pie in a commercial space on the corner of Altadena Drive and Lake Avenue in May 2021.

Side Pie appeared on a list of the 10 best pizzerias in Los Angeles in the Los Angeles Times in August 2022; in November 2024, The Infatuation included Side Pie on a similar list. Both publications praised the "Kevin Lyman" pizza. (Lyman, who co-founded the Warped Tour, was a neighbor of Hockin's.)

== Deadhead connection ==
Hockin is a longtime fan of the Grateful Dead, dating back to his youth in Atlanta, Georgia. When he opened Side Pie, he incorporated his love for the band into the restaurant's motif. His pizza oven featured the Dead's "skull and roses" logo, and he sold a line of tie-dyed clothing that incorporated the band's legacy look while promoting Side Pie.

Hockin was involved with the LA-area Deadhead community and led outings to Dead-related shows. Side Pie held all-ages musical performances—many by local Dead tribute bands—on the loading dock of the outdoor seating area behind the restaurant. One of the performances before the Eaton Fire, on October 12, 2024, was by the Altadena-based duo Dawes, whose singer-guitarist Taylor Goldsmith is a Deadhead.

== The Eaton Fire ==
Side Pie operated at 900 East Altadena Drive until it burned down in the Eaton Fire on January 8, 2025. That morning Hockin and Kvernmo took their daughter Juliet to Disneyland to celebrate her seventh birthday. Hockin was uninsured at the time of the fire. Hockin said he planned to rebuild when it was safe.
