= David Macpherson (engineer) =

David J. Macpherson
- Portrait of Macpherson
- Born: January 12, 1854; Canada West
- Died: October 16, 1927 (aged 73); Pasadena, California, U.S.

David Joseph Macpherson (January 12, 1854 – October 16, 1927) was a Canadian-born civil engineer, mainly known for his work on railroads in North America.

== Early career ==
Macpherson was born in Canada West, and graduated from Cornell University. His first work was as a city planner for San Antonio, Texas, but he is more recognized for his work on railroads, specifically the one from Ciudad Juárez to Mexico City, and the Santa Fe Railroad.

He was the sole survivor of six children who died from consumption or other diseases. This prompted his move to Pasadena, California, in 1885. Pasadena was known for its climate conducive to good health. There he moved into a Dutch Colonial home in the unincorporated area of the Pasadena Highlands.

== Mount Lowe Railway ==
Though he spent time in developments in Pasadena, and was even once the Chairman of the Pasadena Board of Education, he wandered extensively about the foothills conjuring ideas about the development of a scenic mountain railroad to the crest of the San Gabriel Mountains. This idea had been brought up many times by the locals of Pasadena and Sierra Madre alike. It was not until he was introduced to the millionaire Professor Thaddeus S. C. Lowe by Perry M. Green, president of the Pasadena First National Bank, that any idea of funding such a venture came to the fore. Lowe retired to Pasadena from Norristown, Pa., and moved into a 24,000 sq ft (2,200 m^{2}). mansion on Orange Grove Blvd., Pasadena in 1890.

Macpherson Trestle of the Mount Lowe Railway. As customary, it was named by Lowe after his engineer.

Together the men formed the Pasadena & Mt. Wilson Railroad and made plans for a steam cogwheel train to the summit of Mt. Wilson, the likes of which would rival the ones at Mt. Washington, Vermont, and Pikes Peak. Unable to obtain rights of way, the men turned their plans in the direction of Oak Mountain, to become Mount Lowe. The plan for the Mount Lowe Railway was also changed to incorporate an electric streetcar or trolley and a cable car funicular.

Macpherson's designs of trestles and bridges went beyond the engineering standards of the day, particularly the Macpherson Trestle, which was designed to negotiate a deep granite chasm along 500 feet (150 m) of track on a 62% grade.

== Altadena ==
Macpherson acquired the narrow strip of land on which his house was settled, which ran not more than a block wide and a mile in length through the Pasadena Highlands and into Altadena. He laid out the streets and named them after well-known American railroads. From north to south: Erie (now Woodbury Road), which paired with the existing New York Avenue (now Drive) to honor the New York and Erie Railroad; Atchison, Topeka, and Santa Fe (now Elizabeth Street) to honor the Atchison, Topeka and Santa Fe Railway; Denver (now Howard Street) and Rio Grande (later renamed Elizabeth Street) to honor the Denver & Rio Grande Railroad.

In 1920 he built a new home on the corner of Atchison and Mar Vista which, after Pasadena annexation was stopped, remains in Altadena. He died in Pasadena, aged 73.
