= North Lake Line =

Pacific Electric trolley to Pasadena

North Lake

Overview
- Status: Defunct
- Owner: Pacific Electric
- Locale: Southern California
- Termini: Downtown Pasadena; Altadena
- Stations: 21

Service
- Type: Streetcar
- System: Pacific Electric
- Operator(s): Pacific Electric

History
- Opened: 1888
- Closed: January 19, 1941

Technical
- Track gauge: 1,435 mm (4 ft 8 1/2 in)
- Electrification: Overhead line, 600 V DC

The North Lake Line was a local streetcar line in Pasadena, California. It ran primarily on Lake Avenue and was mostly associated with the Pacific Electric Railway route which operated until 1941.

== History ==
The first tracks on North Lake Avenue were constructed by the Highland Street Railway Company in early 1888. The extension to Orange Grove Avenue was built in 1904 by the Pasadena Electric. By 1911, inbound cars on the line were through routed to North Orange Grove Avenue. In January 1913, the line was rerouted via Mendocino Street to Allen Avenue; the branch to Country Club Park on Mendocino Street became the outer terminus that same year. Car 1602 suffered a runaway on the line in 1916, and a derail was installed on Lake south of Mariposa Street to mitigate future issues on the descent from Mt. Lowe. Through routing was changed in July 1923 to the Altadena via the North Fair Oaks Avenue Line, almost forming a loop service. The line north and east of Woodbury and Lake was abandoned on April 3, 1932, and the last car ran on the line on January 19, 1941. Tracks had been removed or paved over by 1981.

== Route ==
The North Lake Line traveled on a double track system in pavement of Lake Avenue from Colorado Boulevard north to Woodbury Road. It then proceeded north on a single track to El Mendocino Street (Mendocino Street) where it turned east to its terminus at Allen Avenue in Altadena.
