= Mount Lowe (California) =

Mountain in California

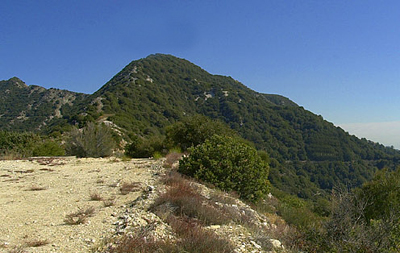
- Mount Lowe from west side

Highest point
- Elevation: 5,606 ft (1,709 m) NAVD 88
- Coordinates: 34°13′55″N 118°06′21″W

Geography
- Location within California Location within the United States
- Location: Los Angeles County, California, U.S.
- Parent range: San Gabriel Mountains
- Topo map: USGS Mount Wilson

Climbing
- Easiest route: Hike

Mount Lowe is a mountain on the southern fold of the San Gabriel Mountains. Originally named Oak Mountain, it was renamed for Professor Thaddeus S.C. Lowe, who is credited for being the first person to set foot on and plant the American flag at its peak, and who built the Mount Lowe Railway to its foot in 1896. The record of the naming was made official by Andrew McNally, the famous Chicago map printer and summertime resident of Altadena, who promised to print "Mount Lowe" on all his maps. Mt. Lowe was established as an alternate route for the Mount Lowe Railway when attempts to procure rights of way to the more prominent Mount Wilson had failed.

A number of trails stem from it due to the Mount Lowe Tavern which was built at Crystal Springs below the summit and operated from 1895 to 1936. One of the historic trails was the "Mount Lowe Eight" which was a mule ride attraction of the hotel that made a figure eight shaped route starting at the Tavern, ascending the summit of Mt. Lowe, returning to the Tavern, and crisscrossing to a trail that headed down Castle Canyon. From there the trail passed down to the Echo Mountain resort and ascended on the return to the Tavern.

Mount Lowe was the upper terminus of the Alpine Division of the Mount Lowe Railway originally incorporated by Professor Lowe as the Pasadena and Mt. Wilson Railroad Co.

Mt. Lowe is approachable from Echo Mountain or Chaney trail via a fire road which was graded over the old railway right-of-way.

== See also ==
- Mount Lowe Railway
- Thaddeus S. C. Lowe
- Echo Mountain
