= Torrance Memorial Medical Center =

- The Torrance Memorial Medical Center's Melanie and Richard Lundquist Tower which opened in 2015.

Geography
- Location: 3330 Lomita Blvd, California 90505, Torrance, California, USA
- Coordinates: 33.812°N 118.343°W

Organisation
- Care system: Private
- Type: Community

Services
- Beds: 401

History
- Founded: 1925

Links
- Lists: Hospitals in California

Torrance Memorial Medical Center is a private hospital located in Torrance, California. Torrance Memorial was the first hospital in the South Bay region and is currently one of the three burn centers in Los Angeles County.

== History ==
Torrance Memorial was founded by the estate of Jared Sidney Torrance in 1925. Throughout the Great Depression, the hospital operated as a non-profit, providing essential care services to the South Bay area. During this time, the hospital was primarily sustained by Mr. Torrance's wife, Helena Childs Torrance, who donated hospital equipment, supplies, and funds.

Over the first decade of operation, Torrance Memorial staff provided care to 10,711 patients and delivered 1,701 babies. In 1947, an additional wing was added to the hospital, along with 23 more beds, all of which were immediately occupied. That same year, Torrance Memorial was rated Class A by the American College of Surgeons, becoming the first of its kind in the region. Torrance Memorial was a local leader in the uniform revolt, allowing nurses to wear colored pantsuits as uniforms, rather than the traditional white dress.

In 1967, Torrance Memorial merged with the smaller Riviera Community Hospital. The hospital moved to its current site (adjacent to Zamperini Field, the Torrance municipal airport) in 1971. In 1973, the hospital opened a laminar airflow room, which was a new technology that provided high-level sterility for surgical procedures, including open-heart surgery, hip replacements, and neurosurgical procedures. Torrance Memorial was the first hospital in the South Bay to provide ultrasound technology to patients and opened South Bay's first blood donor center.

In the 1980s, the hospital began operating as a base station for Los Angeles County paramedics, acquired a CT scanner, and installed the area's first in-house MRI machine. An Intensive Care Newborn Nursery was opened in 1986, with 12 beds for special medical care and nursing for infants. In 1989, Torrance Memorial installed a computer system called SIDNe, which gave staff an easier method of tracking patient information.

The Media Service Department began producing a half-hour informational television show, HealthBeat, on local cable channels in 1998. In 2000, Torrance Memorial installed a Positron Emission Tomography (PET) scanner to map cancer and heart conditions.

In May 2017, it was announced that Torrance Memorial Medical Center along with the Marina Del Rey Hospital will formally affiliate with Cedars-Sinai Medical Center under the new parent organization, Cedars-Sinai Health System. Each hospital will continue to operate separately and will retain their respective board of directors.

== Departments and facilities ==
=== Emergency department ===
The Melanie and Richard Lundquist Emergency Department provides emergency medical care to nearly 7,000 patients every month. The department includes a trauma room, a decontamination unit, an isolated pediatric room, private rooms for women in need of emergency OB/GYN care, and a room equipped for ears, nose, and throat care. Additionally, the emergency department is a designated primary stroke center, STEMI (heart attack) receiving center, and L.A. County paramedic base station. The L.A. County Department of Health Services has also designated Torrance Memorial as an Emergency Department Approved for Pediatrics (EDAP).

=== OB/GYN ===
The Torrance Memorial network includes four OB/GYN facilities in Carson, Manhattan Beach, Redondo Beach, and San Pedro.

=== Pediatrics ===
Torrance Memorial Medical Center provides a wide range of services for children in need of medical care, including 20 pediatric beds and overnight accommodations for parents. The medical center also hosts a pediatric burn center and emergency services.

=== Urgent care ===
Torrance Memorial has two urgent care centers which provide medical care without appointments to patients of all ages. Located in Torrance, Manhattan Beach and El Segundo.

=== Breast Diagnostic Centers ===
Founded in 1986, the center provides advanced diagnostic procedures and health navigation assistance.

=== Home Health and Hospice ===
The medical center offers palliative care options for patients and their families. Its services include psychological and spiritual support programs, homemaker services, speech & physical therapy, bereavement support, respite care for caregivers, and more.

=== Primary care ===
Through a network of physicians in the South Bay area, Torrance Memorial offers family medicine and primary care services at seven locations. This includes three facilities in Torrance, two in Manhattan Beach, and one in Hermosa Beach and Carson.

== Paramedic coverage ==
The medical center has provided medical control for the paramedic units.

- Los Angeles County Fire Department - Squads 2, 6 and 106
- Redondo Beach Fire Department - Rescues 61 & 62
- Torrance Fire Department - Rescues 94 & 96

== Hospital rating data ==
The HealthGrades website contains the clinical quality data for Torrance Memorial Medical Center, as of 2016. For this rating section three different types of data from HealthGrades are presented: clinical quality ratings for thirty-one inpatient conditions and procedures, thirteen patient safety indicators and the percentage of patients giving the hospital a 10 (the highest possible rating).

For inpatient conditions and procedures, there are three possible ratings: worse than expected, as expected, better than expected. For this hospital the data for this category is:

- Worse than expected - 1
- As expected - 27
- Better than expected - 3

For patient safety indicators, there are the same three possible ratings. For this hospital safety indicators were rated as:

- Worse than expected - 1
- As expected - 9
- Better than expected - 3

Percentage of patients rating this hospital as a 10 - 81% Percentage of patients who on average rank hospitals as a 10 - 70%
