= Holliston Church =

Coordinates: 34.146618°N 118.123264°W

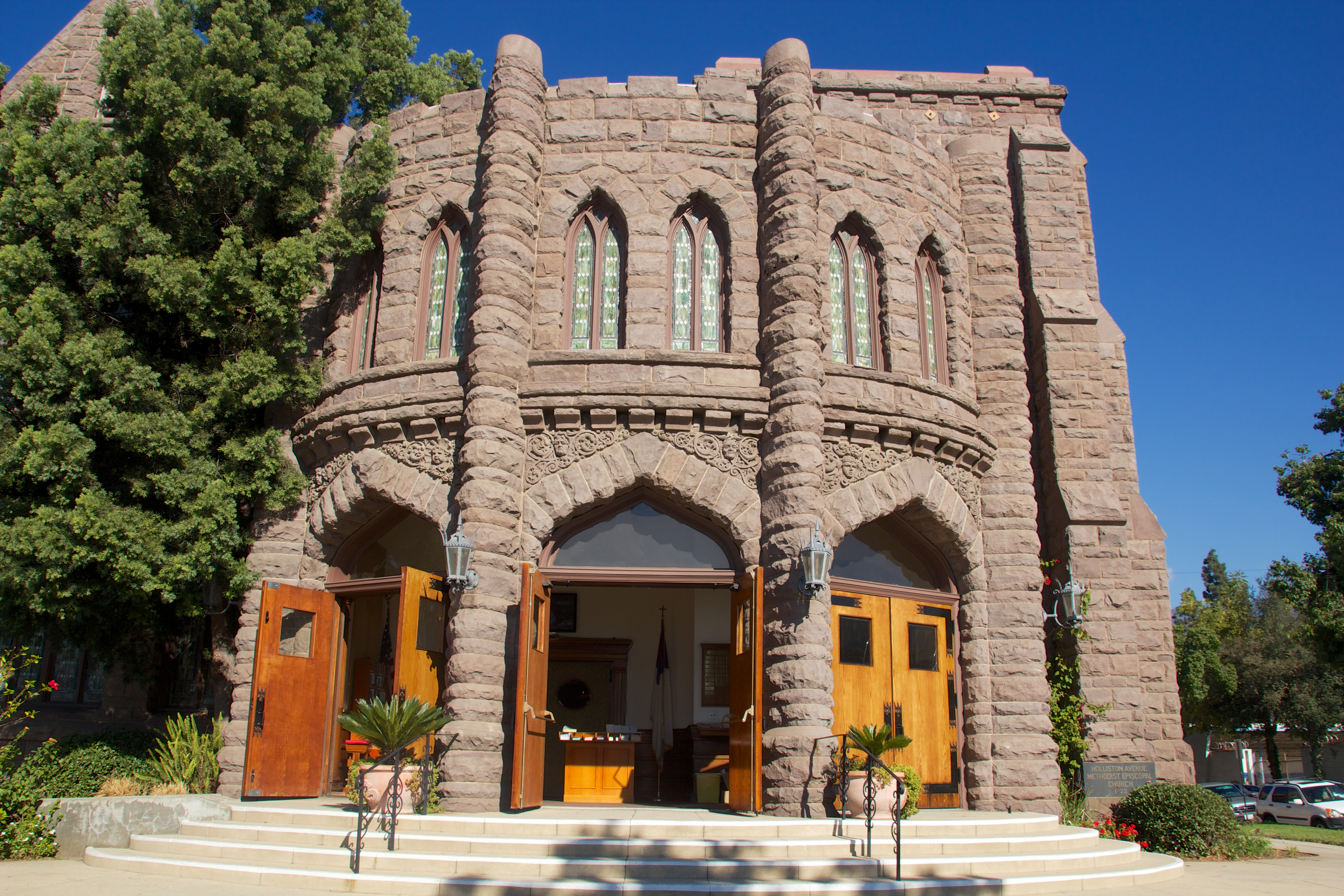
- Holliston Church
- Country: United States

Architecture
- Completed: 1923

Holliston Church is a United Methodist church in Pasadena, California, United States. It primarily serves the Korean community in the greater Pasadena area. The building was moved stone by stone in 1923 from its original location at the corner of Marengo Ave. and Colorado Blvd. in Pasadena to its current location, 1305 East Colorado Boulevard.
