= Edgar Lucien Larkin =

American astronomer and occultist (1847-1924)

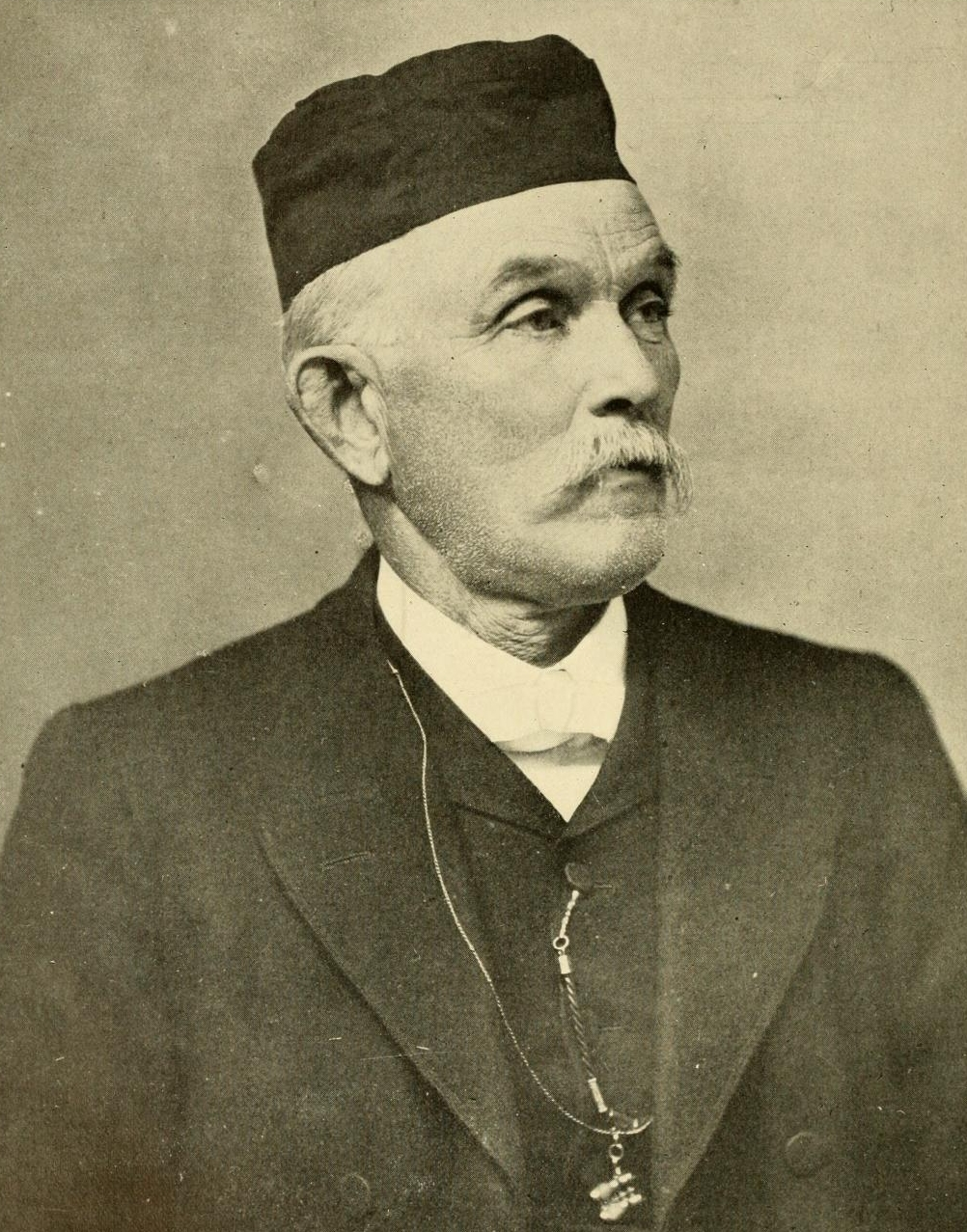

Edgar Lucien Larkin (April 5, 1847 – October 11, 1924) was an American astronomer, occult philosopher, writer and director of the Mount Lowe observatory. He was self taught and gave numerous public lectures styling himself as a professor in popular writings.

== Biography ==
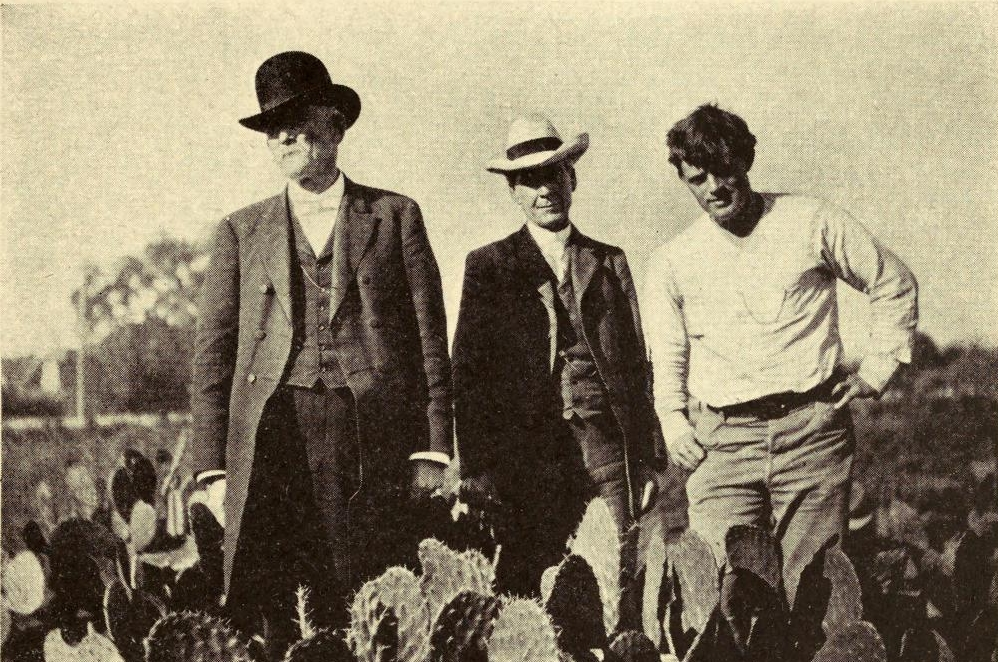
Larkin, Luther Burbank and Jack London in Santa Rosa, 1903

Larkin was born in Indian Creek, Illinois, in a poor farming family. After the death of his father in 1858, his mother moved to Ottawa, Illinois. Here he had access to the library of a local German physician. He went to the local school. He saw Comet Donati when it was shown to him by his grandmother on 5th October 1858 and took to the study of astronomy. He taught in schools and acquired a telescope by 1880 and he moved to Knox College, Galesburg, Illinois, where he studied. He was made director of an observatory at New Windsor, Illinois, where he worked for eight years before returning to the observatory of Knox College.

Poor health made him visit Mount Lowe in California under Lewis Swift. Swift asked Larkin to work there and the mountain air helped Larkin recover health. He then took up a directorship in 1890 and lived on the summit. He organized lectures at the observatory and held special events for schools. The Mount Lowe railroad company also promoted his lectures. In 1905 a storm damaged buildings on Echo Mountain but Larkin and photographer Charles Lawrence were able to save the observatory. He wrote numerous books on astronomy and also had an interest in the occult. He wrote on Atlantis, Mu, Lemuria, and on astronomy in the ancient world. His last book was titled The Matchless Altar of the Soul. His wish was that his ashes were to be scattered atop the mountain and after his death, this was done by his son Ralph.
