= Echo Mountain =

Mountain promontory of the San Gabriel Mountains in California, USA

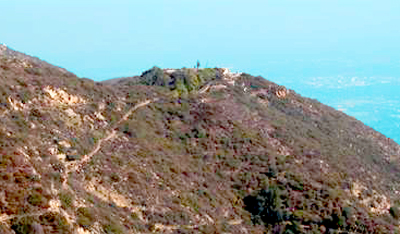
- Echo Mountain as seen from higher point in Las Flores Canyon.

Highest point
- Elevation: 3,210 ft (978 m) NAVD 88
- Prominence: 0–7 ft (0–2 m)
- Coordinates: 34°12′40″N 118°07′16″W

Geography
- Location within California Location within the United States
- Location: Los Angeles County, California, U.S.
- Parent range: San Gabriel Mountains
- Topo map: USGS Mount Wilson

Climbing
- Easiest route: Trail hike

Echo Mountain is a mountain promontory of the San Gabriel Mountains, in the Angeles National Forest above Altadena, in Los Angeles County, California.

== Geography ==
Echo Mountain was shaped from an alluvial fan between Rubio and Las Flores canyons. It is geographically defined by Castle Canyon to its leeward side, Rubio Canyon at its foot, and Las Flores Canyon on its windward side. Echo has a mean elevation of 3,207 feet (977 m). It is most visible as a short mountain extension whose ridge protrudes below the peak of Inspiration Point.

Echo Mountain's name is derived from the number of repetitions one's voice could emit into Castle Canyon. Boy Scout projects were made to find the "sweet spot" where the largest number of repetitions could be heard. During the days of the Mount Lowe Railway "echophones" were set up to assist in voice projections near the best sweet spots.

== History ==
On January 6, 1993, Echo Mountain, also referred to as Mount Echo, was delineated as part of the Mount Lowe Railway monument area listed by the U.S. Forest Service on the National Register of Historic Places. On top of the mountain are the ruins of "White City", a resort along the scenic Mount Lowe Railway, which could easily be seen from the valley below. From its point and down an incline to its foot in Rubio Canyon was the Great Incline funicular of the Mount Lowe Railway, whose white cars could be seen ascending and descending Echo.

== Trail access ==
Echo Mountain can be reached by the Sam Merrill Trail located at the top of Lake Avenue, or via the fire road which extends from Millard Canyon to a point along the old right of way, which will lead to the backside of the promontory.

== Gallery ==
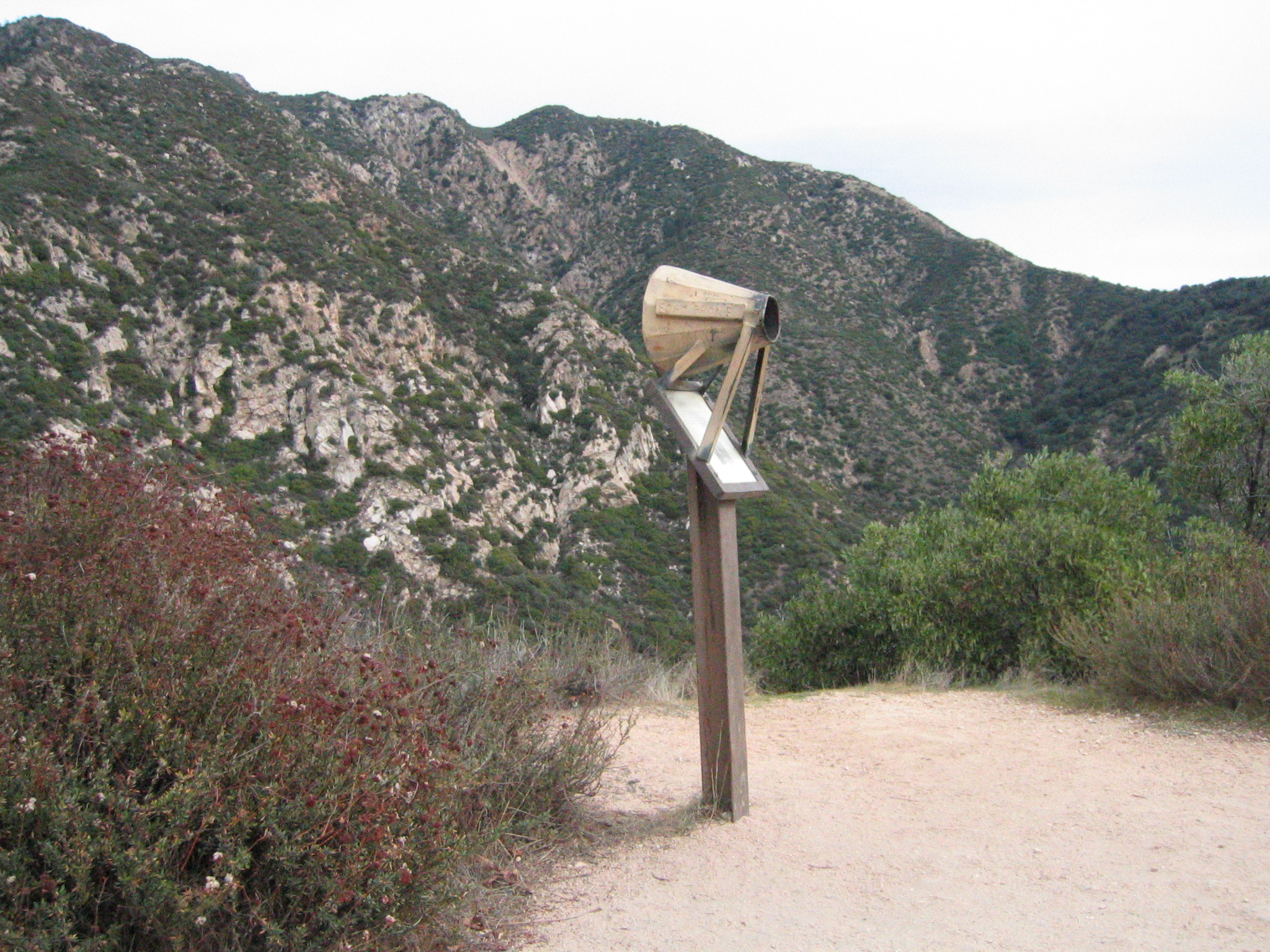
Replica of an "echophone" mounted over the edge of Castle Canyon for visitors' use. The few echophones that still exist are part of personal or museum collections.

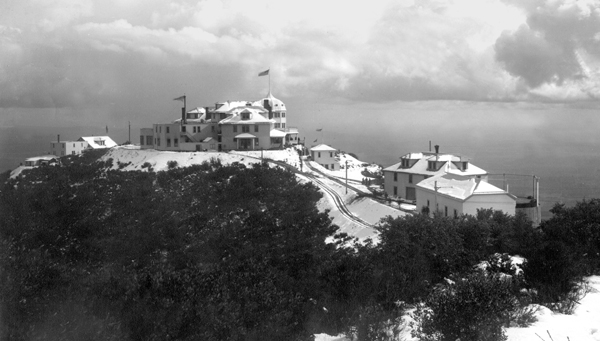
The Echo Mountain Promontory (ca. 1896) after a snowfall, and the White City resort of the Mount Lowe Railway as seen from a higher spot on the ridge and overlooking Altadena, CA. Buildings viewed from left to right: The Echo Chalet, Echo Mountain House, Incline Powerhouse, Dormitories, and Car Barn. Behind the car barn, note an inflatable reservoir for the storage of hydrogen gas produced in Pasadena and piped some 8.5 miles (13.7 km) to Echo. Echo Mountain is also known for its incredible echoes.
