= Jared Sidney Torrance =

American businessman

- Jared Sidney Torrance
- Born: August 3, 1852 or 1853; Gowanda, New York, U.S.
- Died: March 29, 1921 (67 or 68); South Pasadena, California, U.S.
- Occupation: Real estate developer
- Known for: Founder of Torrance, California

Jared Sidney Torrance (August 3, 1852 or 1853 – March 29, 1921) was an American real estate developer, best known as the founder of Torrance in southwest Los Angeles County, California.

== Southern California ==
Jared Torrance was born in Gowanda, New York, in 1853, and moved to Southern California in approximately 1887 to settle initially in Pasadena where he worked in real estate. Among other notable transactions, he briefly owned the Mount Lowe Railway, above Pasadena in the San Gabriel Mountains, at the turn of the century.

=== Torrance, California ===
In the early 1900s, Jared Torrance and other investors saw the value of creating a mixed industrial-residential community south of Los Angeles. They purchased part of the Spanish land grant Rancho San Pedro and hired nationally renowned landscape architect Frederick Law Olmsted Jr. to design a new planned community, with the architect Irving Gill designing the principal buildings. The resulting city, Torrance, California, was founded in 1912 and named after Jared Torrance.

In 1920, Jared Torrance formed the Torrance Hospital Association, but he died before a hospital could be constructed in the new city. His widow Helena Childs Torrance followed through on Jared Torrance's vision, and in 1925 the Jared Sidney Torrance Memorial Hospital was opened. It is now named the Torrance Memorial Medical Center.

== Genealogist ==
Torrance was also an amateur genealogist and did extensive research on his family roots. He wrote a book entitled The Descendants of Lewis Hart and Anne Elliott which was published posthumously by his wife in 1923.

== Death ==
Jared Sidney Torrance died on March 29, 1921 at his home in South Pasadena, California after an illness of less than two weeks.
