= Lake Avenue (Pasadena) =

North-south road, Los Angeles County, California, U.S.

- Location: Los Angeles
- Coordinates: 34.177154°N 118.131865°W
- South end: Oak Knoll Avenue / Oak Knoll Circle in Oak Knoll, Pasadena

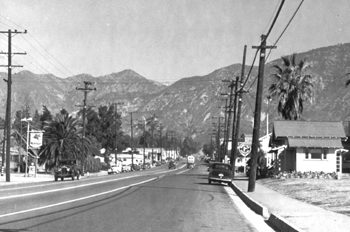
Lake Avenue in Altadena just below Mendocino Street c. 1936.

Lake Avenue is a major north–south feeder road for the communities of Pasadena and Altadena in Los Angeles County, California. The road was developed in the mid-19th century and takes its name from a lake that was located at its southernmost end known variously as Mission Lake, Kewen Lake, and Wilson Lake, reflecting different owners of the land. The lake bed still exists as a municipal park (Lacy Park) in the City of San Marino just south of the Raymond Dike, but it holds no water. It has been surrounded by residences who are served by a crisscross set of roads that dip into the edges of impression and back out the other side. Lake Avenue is approximately 5.06 miles (8.14 km) in length.

== Transportation ==
Metro Local line 662 and Pasadena Transit line 20 run on Lake Avenue: the former starts at Del Mar Boulevard and the latter through most of Lake Avenue between California Boulevard and Woodbury Road. A Metro A Line station is located at Interstate 210 under Lake Avenue.

Streetcar tracks in the center of Lake Avenue were constructed by the Highland Railroad Company in 1888. Pacific Electric would go on to operate local Red Cars along the street, with service ending in January 1941.

== Route description ==
=== Altadena ===
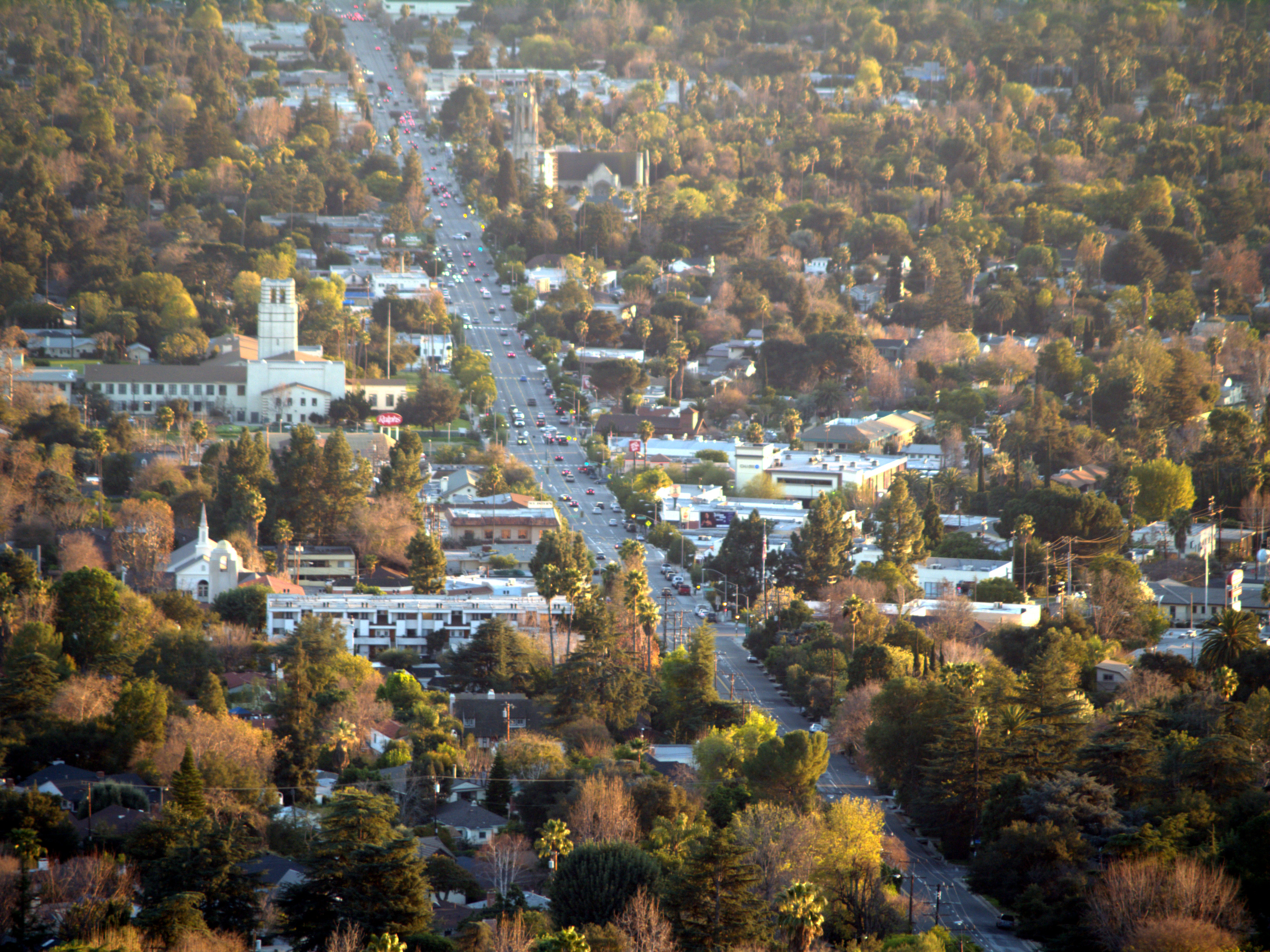
Lake Avenue in Altadena

The northernmost end of the road lies at the very foot of the San Gabriel Mountains in Altadena and immediately accesses Las Flores Canyon. The first resident of Las Flores Canyon was the Forsyth Ranch. It sold in 1919 to Mr. Cobb who had an enormous and fascinating estate on the alluvial fan which emanates from the Canyon. Las Flores was also known for its small and short-lived gold mining operations there. The Cobb Estate was deeded to the United States Forest Service as a free growth Arboretum in 1967. The gates on Lake Avenue mark the entrance to the estate which still has its long, paved, curving driveway which leads to the site of the defunct manor. The adjacent trailhead of the Sam Merrill Trail also leads into the canyon from Lake Avenue. This is the origin of the local term "top of Lake," which refers to the northernmost neighborhoods.

In the days of the Red Car in Altadena (1902–1941), Lake Avenue was known as the short line, or Oak Knoll line. Oak Knoll is the street into which Lake Avenue transitions with a slow curve to the right and then back to the left. The Pacific Electric cars came up from a switch on the Huntington Drive line below the famous hotel of the same name. The “short line” was a shorter way to get to Lake and Mariposa in Altadena without having to ride the circuitous route up Fair Oaks Avenue.

In 1914 a spur on the short line was built across Mendocino Street from Lake Avenue to Allen Street and the development of Country Club Parks. The line was put there to access the new development and the Altadena Country Club and Golf Course.

=== Pasadena ===
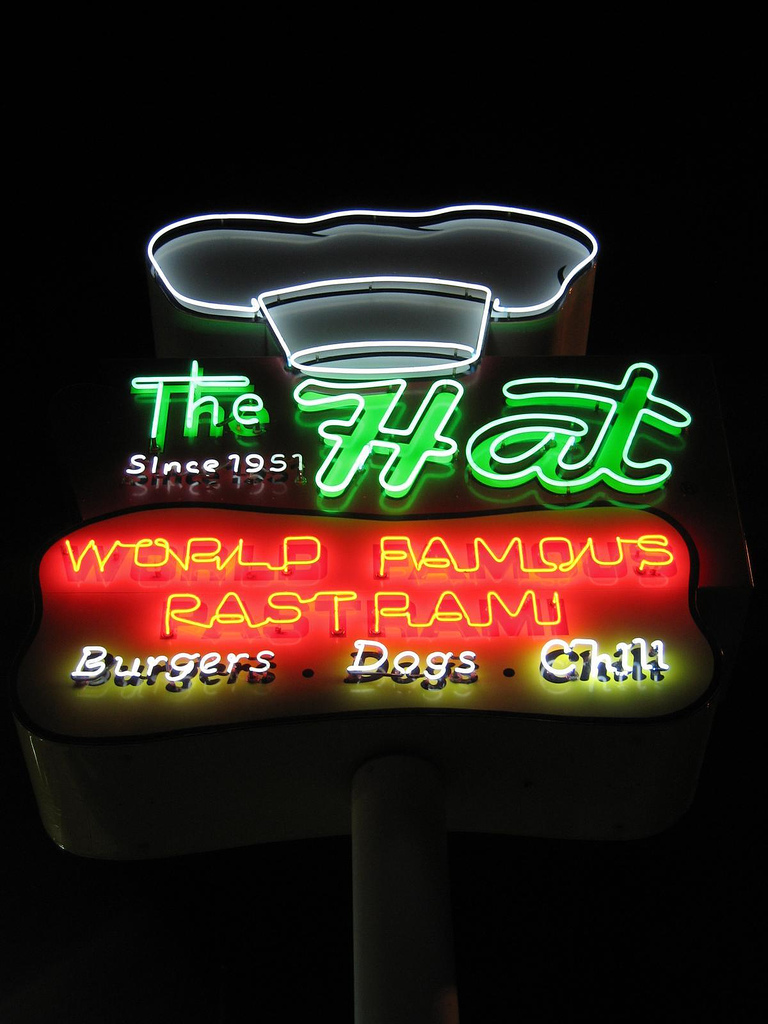
The Hat on Lake

Lake Avenue was originally named Lake Vineyard Avenue after the ranch of the same name (on which the lake mentioned above was located) on which the street was partially located. Lake Avenue is located centrally to Pasadena and is the East–West divider of the city; Fair Oaks Avenue and Colorado Boulevard mark the postal center of town (0e/w, 0n/s) where its downtown section had originally developed. This postal division carries through into Altadena. However, Lake defines County Road Division No. 5 (West) from County Road Division No. 4 (East). Holliston Church is located at the intersection with Colorado. Lake Avenue defines the eastern boundary of the original Woodbury Ranch purchase of 937 acres (3.79 km^{2}).

In Pasadena, Lake Avenue serves a great number of business districts and is relatively free of residential addresses, though some still exist from earlier times. Well known to locals is the South Lake Avenue Business District which runs south from Green Street to California Boulevard, about 1 mile (1.6 km) in length. The shops on the east side of South Lake Avenue are notable for being accessible from the street and from Shoppers' lane, a half-mile long alleyway that runs alongside Lake Avenue. Also located on Lake Avenue is a large Macy's department store built in early 1940s modern architecture.

== See also ==
- List of streets in the San Gabriel Valley
- Colorado Boulevard
- Mount Wilson Toll Road

== Bibliography ==
- Reid, Hiram A. (1895). History of Pasadena. Pasadena History Co. OL 14013115M.
